= Corporate affairs of Singapore Airlines =

Singapore government investment company

Singapore Airlines is majority-owned by Singapore government investment and holding company Temasek Holdings, which holds 56% of voting stock.

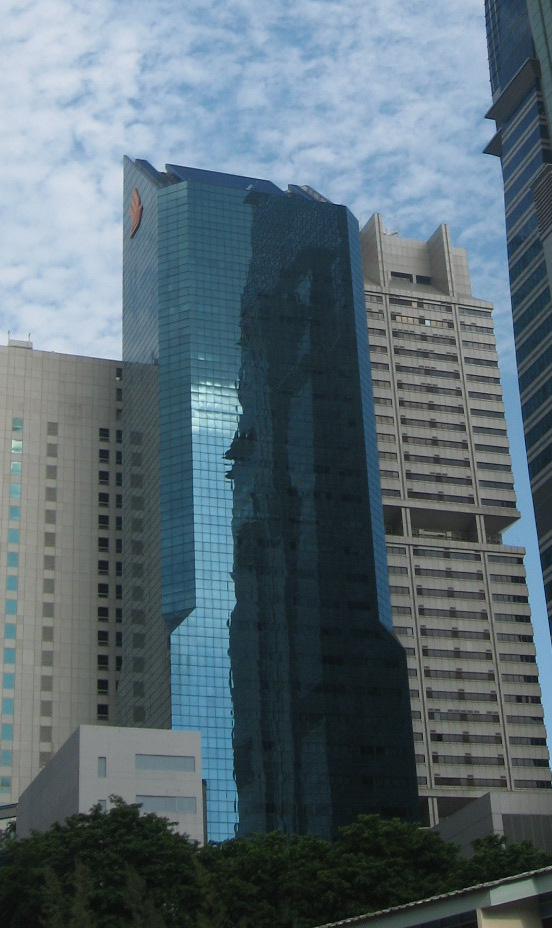
Robinson 77 (formerly known as SIA Building) was the flagship building for Singapore Airlines, before it was sold in 2006.

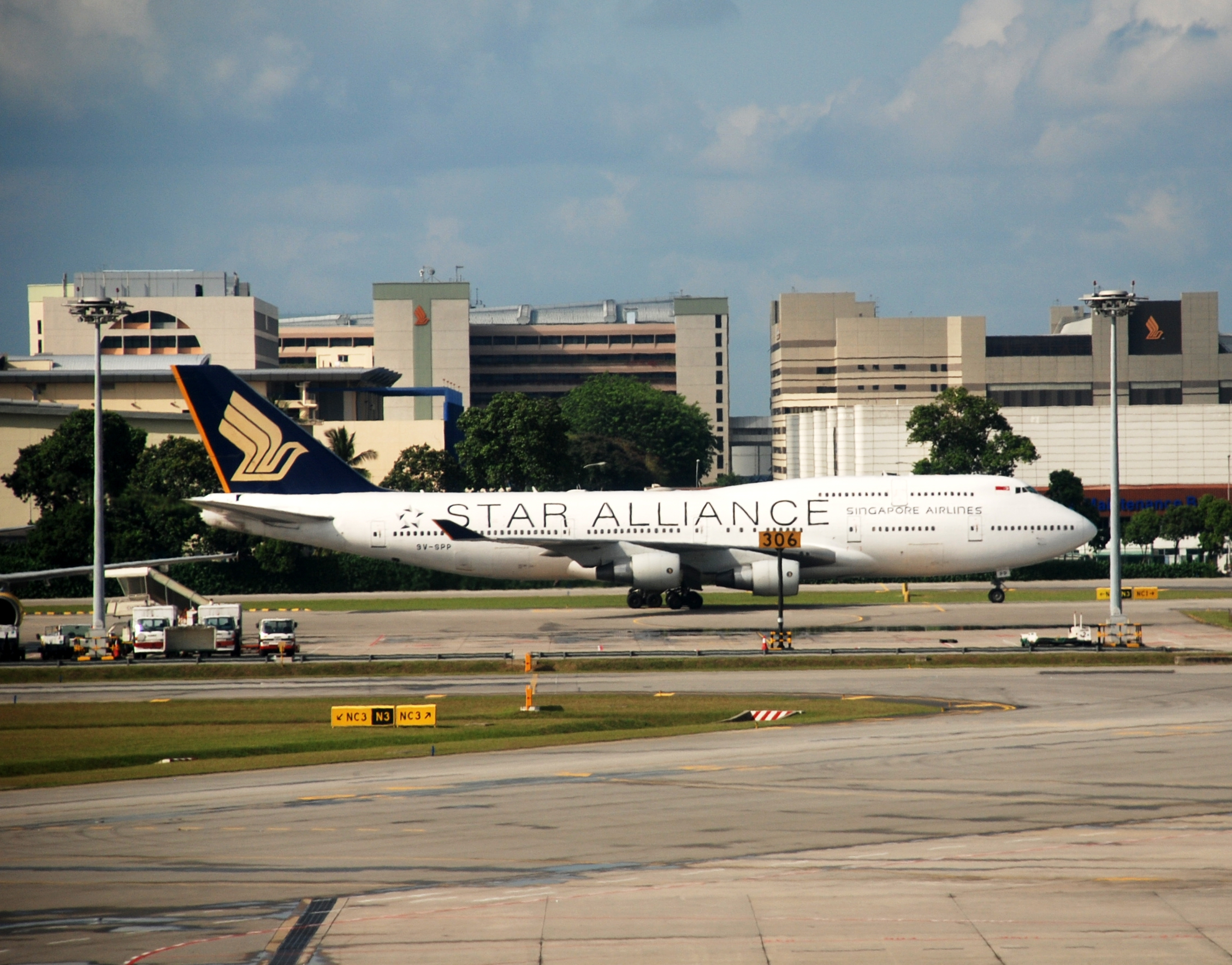
Airline House, the corporate head office of Singapore Airlines, in the background

== Subsidiaries ==
Singapore Airlines has diversified into related industries and sectors, including ground handling, aircraft leasing, aviation engineering, air catering, and tour operations. It has also restructured itself by hiving off operational units as fully owned subsidiaries to maintain its core business as a passenger airline. The Singapore Airlines Group comprised 25 subsidiaries, 32 associates, and two joint venture companies in the financial year ending 31 March 2007. SIA sold all its equity share of 35.5% in a joint venture, Singapore Aircraft Leasing Enterprise, to the Bank of China for US$980 million on 15 December 2006.

There were suggestions to divest SIA Engineering Company and Singapore Airport Terminal Services, two of SIA's largest subsidiaries. Former Minister Mentor Lee Kuan Yew, for one, voiced his opinion in December 2005 that Singapore Airlines should divest these two companies to focus on its core business of air transportation. Singapore Airlines has evaluated the divestment opportunity and Singapore Airport Terminal Services (which was renamed as SATS Group) was diversified from the group on 1 September 2009.

On 18 May 2016, Singapore Airlines established Budget Aviation Holdings, a holding company to own and manage its budget airlines Scoot and Tigerair following the delisting of Tigerair from the Singapore stock exchange.

On 19 May 2017, Singapore Airlines announced that Singapore Airlines Cargo would be re-integrated as a division within the SIA group, expected to be completed in the first half of 2018, after which Singapore Airlines Cargo will become the airline's cargo division.

On 18 May 2018, it was announced that SilkAir would undergo cabin refreshes before being merged with the parent brand Singapore Airlines. At the time, it was anticipated that the cabin revamps would start in 2020.

Companies in the Singapore Airlines Group include:

Company	Type	Principal activities	Incorporated in	Group's equity shareholding (31 March 2013)
SIA Engineering Company Limited	Subsidiary	Engineering	Singapore	78.6%
Aircraft Maintenance Services Australia Pty Ltd	Subsidiary	Aircraft maintenance and handling	Australia	78.6%
Nexgen Network (1) Holding Pte Ltd	Subsidiary	Investment	Singapore	78.6%
Nexgen Network (2) Holding Pte Ltd	Subsidiary	Investment	Singapore	78.6%
SIA Engineering (USA) Inc	Subsidiary	Aircraft maintenance and handling	United States	78.6%
SIAEC Global Pte Ltd	Subsidiary	Investment	Singapore	78.6%
SIA Engineering (Philippines) Corporation	Subsidiary	Engineering	Philippines	51.6%
Singapore Jamco Pte Ltd	Subsidiary	Engineering	Singapore	51.1%
Singapore Airlines Cargo Pte Ltd	Subsidiary	Cargo airline	Singapore	100.0%
Cargo Community Network Pte Ltd	Subsidiary	Marketing	Singapore	51.0%
Cargo Community (Shanghai) Co Ltd	Subsidiary	Marketing	China	51.0%
Scoot Pte Ltd	Subsidiary	Airline	Singapore	100.0%
Tradewinds Tours & Travel Private Limited	Subsidiary	Tour wholesaling	Singapore	100.0%
Singapore Aviation and General Insurance Company (Pte) Ltd	Subsidiary	Insurance	Singapore	100.0%
Singapore Flying College Pte Ltd	Training	Subsidiary	Singapore	100.0%
Abacus Travel Systems Pte Ltd	Marketing	Subsidiary	Singapore	61.0%
SIA (Mauritius) Ltd	Subsidiary	Recruitment	Mauritius	100.0%
International Engine Component Overhaul Pte Ltd	Joint venture	Engineering	Singapore	39.3%
Singapore Aero Engine Services Pte Ltd	Joint venture	Engineering	Singapore	39.3%

=== Scoot ===
In May 2011, Singapore Airlines revealed plans to launch a low-fare airline subsidiary within a year. The wholly owned subsidiary, New Aviation, was incorporated on 17 June 2011 with an issued and paid up capital of S$1.

On 1 November 2011, it was announced that the low-cost airline would be named Scoot and would begin flights from mid-2012 with a fleet of four Boeing 777-200 wide-body aircraft, focused on medium- and long-haul routes. The airline will be wholly owned but operated independently and managed separately from Singapore Airlines.

=== Vistara ===
In 2013, Singapore Airlines announced the formation of a joint venture with India's Tata Sons, which was later christened as Vistara (means "limitless expanse" in Sanskrit). The full-service airline, based in New Delhi's Indira Gandhi International Airport commenced operation on 9 January 2015. As of March 2020, the airline served 36 cities across India, Thailand, Sri Lanka, the United Arab Emirates (UAE), Nepal, and Singapore with a fleet of Airbus A320, Boeing 787 and Boeing 737-800NG aircraft. Vistara completed its merger with Air India in November 2024, following which Singapore Airlines purchased a 25.1% stake in Air India.

== Operational investments ==
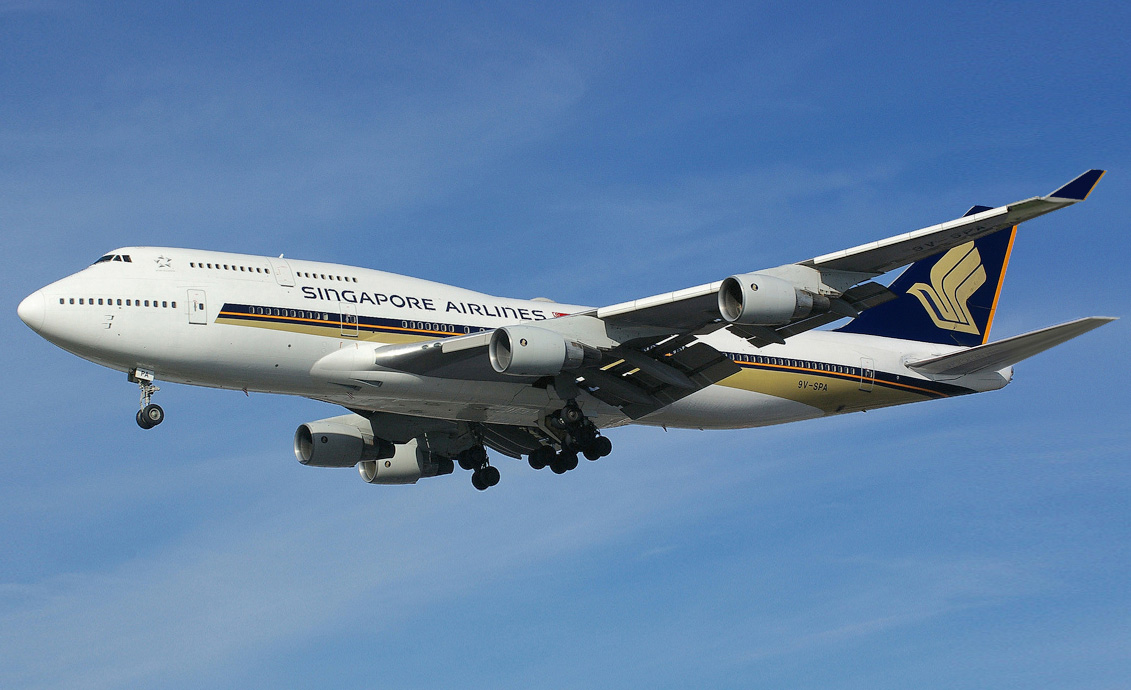
Boeing 747-400 arriving at Heathrow Airport

The airline has invested in other airlines in a bid to expand beyond its Singapore base. In 1989, it formed a tripartite alliance with Delta Air Lines and Swissair, but terminated their partnership in 1999 after divesting their 5% equity stake in each other's company.

The airline also purchased 25% of Air New Zealand in 2000. However following the near collapse of Air New Zealand, the New Zealand government bought into the airline to rescue it from bankruptcy, reducing Singapore Airlines' stake to 4.5%. This was subsequently sold in October 2004 at a substantial loss.

SIA bought a 49% stake in Virgin Atlantic on 30 March 2000 worth £600 million in cash in the hope of leveraging on it on the lucrative transatlantic market, but by 2007, there had been reports of underperformance and the possibility of divesting its stake. On 14 May 2008, the company formally announced an invitation for offers for its Virgin Atlantic stake, and publicly acknowledged that its stake in the airline had "underperformed". On 12 December 2012, Singapore Airlines sold its 49% stake in Virgin Atlantic for US$360 million to Delta Air Lines.

In September 2004, the airline entered the low-cost carrier market by establishing Tiger Airways with a 49% stake, in partnership with Indigo Partners (24%); Irelandia Investments, the private investment arm of Tony Ryan and his family, (16%); and Temasek Holdings (11%). Tiger Airways was eventually listed on Singapore Exchange in February 2010, reducing SIA's share of ownership to 34.4%.

SIA purchased a 10% stake in Virgin Australia Holdings in October 2012. When it collapsed in April 2020, SIA owned 20%.

In November 2024, SIA purchased a 25.1% stake in Air India following Air India's merger with Vistara.

== Labour ==
The Singapore Airlines Group employed a total of 21,534 staff members at the end of the fiscal year on 31 March 2011. The parent airline itself employed 13,942 (47.3%), of which there are 2,174 pilots and 6,914 cabin crew. The group's employees are represented by five labour unions, namely the Singapore Airlines Staff Union (SIASU), the SIA Engineering Company Engineers and Executives Union (SEEU), the Singapore Airport Terminal Services Workers' Union (SATSWU), the Air Transport Executives Staff Union (AESU) and the Air Line Pilots' Association Singapore (ALPA-S).

Relations between the labour unions and the group management have been testy at times, particularly after a series of wage cuts, retrenchments, and early retirement affected staff morale during and after difficult economic conditions such as the SARS outbreak in 2003. The ALPA-S alone has been involved in no less than 24 disputes with group management since its registration in May 1981 (itself formed after its predecessor, the Singapore Airlines Pilots Association had 15 EXCO members charged and convicted for initiating illegal industrial action in 1980 in the wake of disputes with management and the SIAPA was deregistered on 26 February 1981) up to 30 November 2003, when the Ministry of Manpower (Singapore) amended the Trade Unions Act to overrule an item in ALPA-S's constitution requiring formal ratification from the general membership for negotiation agreements involving the executive committee. In 2007, the airline was in the spotlight again when ALPA-S disagreed with the management's proposed salary rate for pilots flying the Airbus A380, and the case had to be settled by the Industrial Arbitration Court. The salary ranges of SIA's pilots were made public during the first day of the hearings, and the press noted that the airline's 935 captains who fly the Boeing 777 received higher salaries (over S$270,000) at the midpoint of their salary brackets compared to the company's 36 vice-presidents (S$233,270).

Disputes have also affected the unions, some so severe that they have attracted the intervention of the government. The internal feuding in ALPA-S which led to the ousting of the entire 22-member executive committee on 17 November 2003 was attributed to "internal politics" and theories that it may involve former pilots, including those involved in the deregistration of SIAPA. In January 2008, NTUC secretary-general Lim Swee Say spoke up against legal action by parties involved in an internal dispute in SIASU.

On 2 April 2007 the airline group and its unions jointly launched the "Singapore Airlines Group Union-Management Partnership" and the Labour Movement 2011 (LM2011) in a bid to improve their relations, each pledging to be "pro-worker" and "pro-business" respectively. In April 2008, the airline's chairman Stephen Lee described the relations between management and the unions as "stable and cordial" in the last two years, with better communication between them. He alluded that several government figures, including Minister Mentor Lee Kuan Yew, has intervened to help alleviate differences, and that there has been more regular meetings and exchanges between the two sides.

== Financial performance ==
Singapore Airlines Group financial highlights
Year ended	Revenue (S$m)	Expenditure (S$m)	Operating profit (S$m)	Profit before taxation (S$m)	Profit attributable to equity holders (S$m)	EPS after tax – diluted (cents)
31 March 1999	7,795.9	6,941.5	854.4	1,116.8	1,033.2	80.6
31 March 2000	9,018.8	7,850.0	1,168.8	1,463.9	1,163.8	91.4
31 March 2001	9,951.3	8,604.6	1,346.7	1,904.7	1,549.3	126.5
31 March 2002	9,382.8	8,458.2	924.6	925.6	631.7	51.9
31 March 2003	10,515.0	9,797.9	717.1	976.8	1,064.8	87.4
31 March 2004	9,761.9	9,081.5	680.4	820.9	849.3	69.7
31 March 2005	12,012.9	10,657.4	1,355.5	1,829.4	1,389.3	113.9
31 March 2006	13,341.1	12,127.8	1,213.3	1,662.1	1,240.7	101.3
31 March 2007	14,494.4	13,180.0	1,314.4	2,284.6	2,128.8	170.8
31 March 2008	15,972.5	13,848.0	2,124.5	2,547.2	2,049.4	166.1
31 March 2009	15,996.3	15,092.7	903.6	1,198.6	1,061.5	89.1
31 March 2010	12,707.3	12,644.1	63.2	271.7	215.8	18.0
31 March 2011	14,524.8	13,253.5	1,271.3	1,403.5	1,092.0	90.2
31 March 2012	14,857.8	14,571.9	285.9	433.3	335.9	27.9
31 March 2013	15,098.2	14,869.0	229.2	469.6	378.9	31.9
31 March 2014	15,243.9	14,984.6	259.3	367.9	359.5	30.3
31 March 2015	15,565.5	15,156.1	409.4	442.9	367.9	31.2

=== Operating performance ===
Singapore Airlines operating highlights (parent airline company only)
Year ended	Passengers (thousand)	RPK (million)	ASK (million)	Load factor (%)	Yield (S¢/km)	Unit cost (cents/ASK)	Breakeven load factor (%)
31 March 1993	8,640	37,860.6	53,100.4	71.3	10.5	-	-
31 March 1994	9,468	42,328.3	59,283.3	71.4	10.1	-	-
31 March 1995	10,082	45,412.2	64,053.9	70.9	9.9	-	-
31 March 1996	11,057	50,045.4	68,555.3	73.0	9.4	-	-
31 March 1997	12,022	54,692.5	73,511.4	74.4	9.0	-	-
31 March 1998	11,957	54,441.2	77,221.6	70.5	9.5	-	-
31 March 1999	12,777	60,299.9	83,191.7	72.5	8.6	-	-
31 March 2000	13,782	65,718.4	87,728.3	74.9	9.1	-	-
31 March 2001	15,002	71,118.4	92,648.0	76.8	9.4	7.5	70.2
31 March 2002	14,765	69,994.5	94,558.5	74.0	9.0	6.4	71.1
31 March 2003	15,326	74,183.2	99,565.9	74.5	9.1	6.7	73.6
31 March 2004	13,278	64,685.2	88,252.7	73.3	9.2	6.7	72.8
31 March 2005	15,944	77,593.7	104,662.3	74.1	10.1	7.0	69.3
31 March 2006	16,995	82,741.7	109,483.7	75.6	10.6	7.5	70.8
31 March 2007	18,346	89,148.8	112,543.8	79.2	10.9	7.9	72.5
31 March 2008	19,120	91,485.2	113,919.1	80.3	12.1	8.4	69.4
31 March 2009	18,293	90,128.1	117,788.7	76.5	12.5	9.2	73.6
31 March 2010	16,480	82,882.5	105,673.7	78.4	10.4	8.6	82.7
31 March 2011	16,647	84,801.3	108,060.2	78.5	11.9	8.9	74.8
31 March 2012	17,155	87,824.0	113,409.7	77.4	11.8	9.2	78.0
31 March 2013	18,210	93,765.6	118,264.4	79.3	11.4	9.2	80.7
31 March 2014	18,628	95,064.3	120,502.8	78.9	11.1	9.1	82.0
31 March 2015	18,737	94,209.2	120,000.8	78.5	11.2	8.9	79.5

== Marketing and sponsorships ==
From 2000 until 2015, SIA was the title sponsor of the Singapore Airlines International Cup, a Group 1 flat horse race.

In April 2014, SIA announced that it has signed an agreement with the Formula One Group to be the Title Sponsor of the Formula 1 Singapore Grand Prix, taking over from Singtel.

== Branding ==
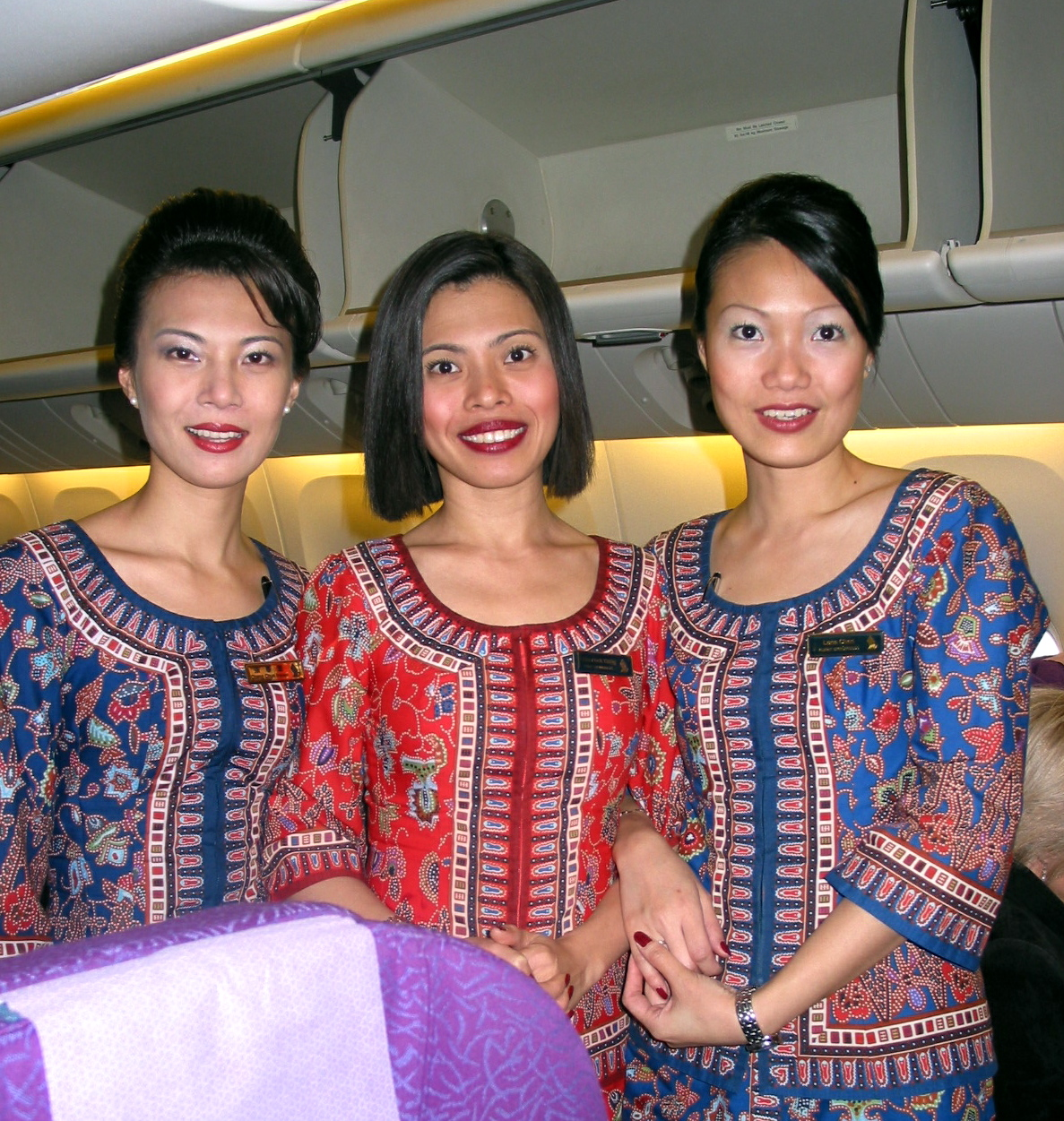
Flight attendants, known as the Singapore Girls, are heavily marketed as the airline's icon.

Branding and publicity efforts have revolved primarily around flight crew, in contrast to most other airlines, who tend to emphasise aircraft and services in general. In particular, the promotion of its female flight attendants known as Singapore Girls has been widely successful and is a common feature in most of the airline's advertisements and publications. This branding strategy aims to build a mythical aura around the Singapore Girl, and portray her as representative of Asian hospitality and grace and the airline's training program for both cabin and technical flight crew complement this objective. This is similar to the tactics that Pan Am used as they also tried to promote their stewardesses as a big attraction to flying on the airline.

Dressed in a version of the Sarong Kebaya designed by Pierre Balmain in 1968, the uniform of the Singapore Girl has remained largely unchanged. Stewards previously wore light-blue business jackets and grey trousers. Since June 2008, this has been redesigned by Christophe Galibert, artistic Director of Balmain Uniformes. The new steward's uniform now features a single-breasted navy blue suit (jacket and trousers), a sky blue shirt and different coloured striped ties. The tie colours differentiate the four ranks of cabin crew: inflight supervisor, chief steward(ess), leading steward(ess), and steward(ess).

Although a successful marketing image for the airline, the "Singapore Girl" emphasis received criticisms for its portrayal of women as subservient to males. Feminist groups say that its cultural references are outdated and that most Singaporean women today are modern and independent.

On 9 January 2007, the airline announced it would put to tender its existing advertising contract with Batey Ads, the Singaporean company headed by founder Ian Batey, who was responsible for building up the Singapore Girl brand name and its partner since 1972. The image of the Singapore Girl would still remain, although SIA will now focus on advertising and promoting its modern fleet and technology instead. On 16 April 2007, the airline appointed New York-based advertising agent TBWA to handle its creative advertising for the airline. The contract is worth S$50 million per year over the following five years. Stephen Forshaw, SIA's Vice-President of Public Affairs, said they will start the new branding campaign "as early as there is a practicable opportunity". This change in advertising agency will not affect SIA's buying media agency, which is presently MEC.

The Singapore Airlines logo is a bird, inspired by a silver kris, which comes from the keris, a dagger from Southeast Asia prominently featured in the region's myth and folklore. The keris is central in Singapore Airline's branding, such as the SilverKris lounge and the KrisWorld entertainment system. The logo is featured on the tailfin and in the airline's collaterals, and has remained unchanged since Singapore Airlines' inception from the split of Malaysia–Singapore Airlines. The logotype and stripes underwent a minor tweak in 1987. The livery had a recent change, which saw the "Singapore Airlines" logotype enlarged and moved towards the front and the "bird" logo on the tailfin enlarged, in a similar fashion to the livery variant used on the Airbus A380. However, the stripes and the "bird" remain the same.
