= Riz =

Riz or RIZ may refer to:

== Places in Iran ==
- Bar Riz, a city in Kerman Province
- Riz, Iran, a city in Bushehr Province
- Riz, Ardabil, a village in Ardabil Province
- Riz District, Bushehr Province
  - Riz Rural District, in Riz District
- Riz e lenjan, a city in Isfahan Province
- Riz Kan, a village in Fars Province
- Riz Poultry Company, a company town in Semnan Province

== People ==
- Riz (singer) (born 1986), Malaysian entertainer
- Riz Ahmed (born 1982), British film actor
- Riz Khan (born 1962), British television news reporter
- Riz Maslen, English electronic music artist
- Riz Ortolani (1926–2014), Italian film composer
- Gábor Riz (born 1956), Hungarian educator and politician
- Martin Riz (born 1980), Italian ski mountaineer
- Roland Riz (1927–2026), Italian lawyer, politician and academic from South Tyrol

== Other uses ==
- RIZ (company), a Croatian electronics company
- Riz (film), a 2015 Australian film co-written, directed and produced by S. Shakthidharan

== See also ==
- Rizz (disambiguation)
- Riz Ab (disambiguation)
- Ris (disambiguation)
