= Johniepee =

Australian rapper (born 1992)

- Born: John Pownall; 6 June 1992 (age 34); Perth, Western Australia, Australia
- Occupations: Rapper; songwriter; record producer; personal trainer; disability support worker
- Years active: 2016–present

John Pownall (born 6 June 1992), known professionally as Johniepee, is an Australian rapper, songwriter, and record producer.

== Career ==
While working as a personal trainer in Sydney, Australia, Johniepee formed a friendship with client Bliss (Jonathan Notley) of the Australian hip-hop recording group Bliss n Eso. With experience only performing live shows to intimate crowds, Bliss invited Johniepee to be an opening act for Bliss n Eso's February/March 2017 The Dopamine Tour. Johniepee went on to release his debut EP, Bigger Things.

His single October 2017 single "Stay" gained notoriety after Tigerair began playing the song on inflight programming for all domestic flights in 2019.

He released his debut album, Attachment Theory, in November 2019. He released his second album, The Dress Circle, on 19 November 2021.

== Discography ==
- Bigger Things (2017)
- Gimme a Minute (2019)
- Worth the Wait (2019)
- Attachment Theory (2019)
- The Dress Circle (2021)
