= Tigerair Mandala =

Low-cost airline of Indonesia (1969–2014)

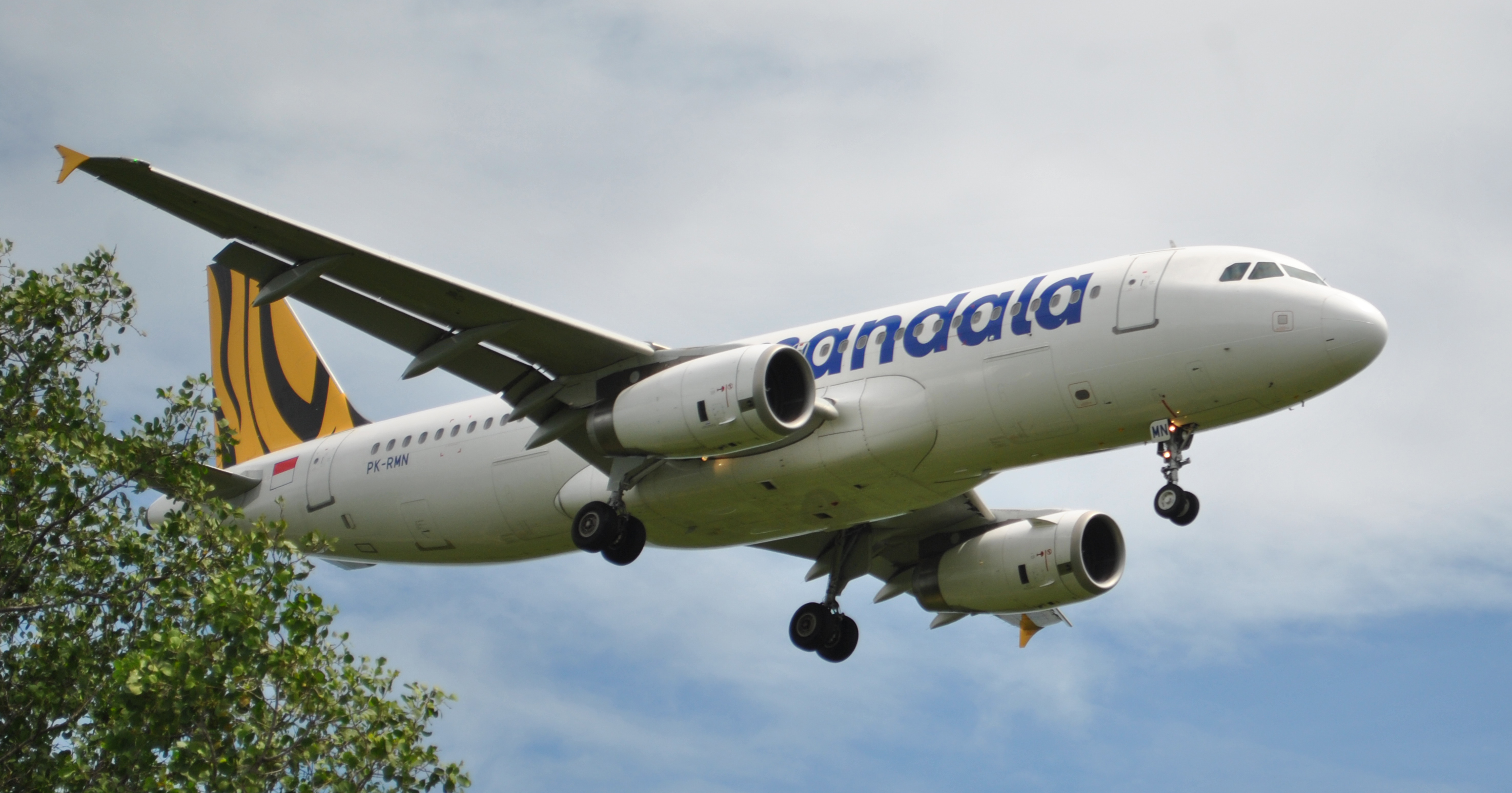
IATA	ICAO	Call sign
RI	MDL	MANDALA
- Founded: 17 April 1969 (as Mandala Airlines)
- Commenced operations: 2012
- Ceased operations: 1 July 2014
- Operating bases: Jakarta–Soekarno-Hatta; Pekanbaru; Surabaya
- Parent company: Saratoga Investama Sedaya (51.3%); Tigerair
- Headquarters: Soekarno-Hatta International Airport, Cengkareng, Indonesia
- Key people: Paul Rombeek (president director); Mike Coltman (VP operations); Andry Irwan (finance director)

Tigerair Mandala (formerly Mandala Airlines) was a low-cost carrier headquartered in Jakarta, Indonesia. It was founded in 1969 as a full service airline by members of the Indonesian military. In 2006, as part of the ongoing reforms, the military was forced to sell Mandala Airlines, with the new owners converting it to a low-cost carrier. In January 2011, facing bankruptcy, Mandala Airlines filed for protection from its creditors, and ceased operations. In May 2011, Singapore based Tiger Airways Holdings made an offer to purchase Mandala, but the transaction did not close until September 2011. The airline did not return to service until April 2012, renamed Tigerair Mandala, following an injection of fresh capital by Indonesian conglomerate Saratoga Investment Corp.

For the next two years, Tigerair Mandala shared Tigerair's sales, distribution and marketing channels. Tigerair Mandala's fleet of new Airbus A320 aircraft (brand new aircraft originally ordered for Tigerair Singapore) flew primarily within the more populous regions of Java and Sumatra, providing domestic and regional international connections of no more than five hours. It planned to increase its fleet to 15 aircraft by year-end 2013 and to 25 by 2015.

In terms of the airline's air operators certificate (AOC) history, it was technically the oldest airline in the Tiger Airways Holdings Group.

== History ==
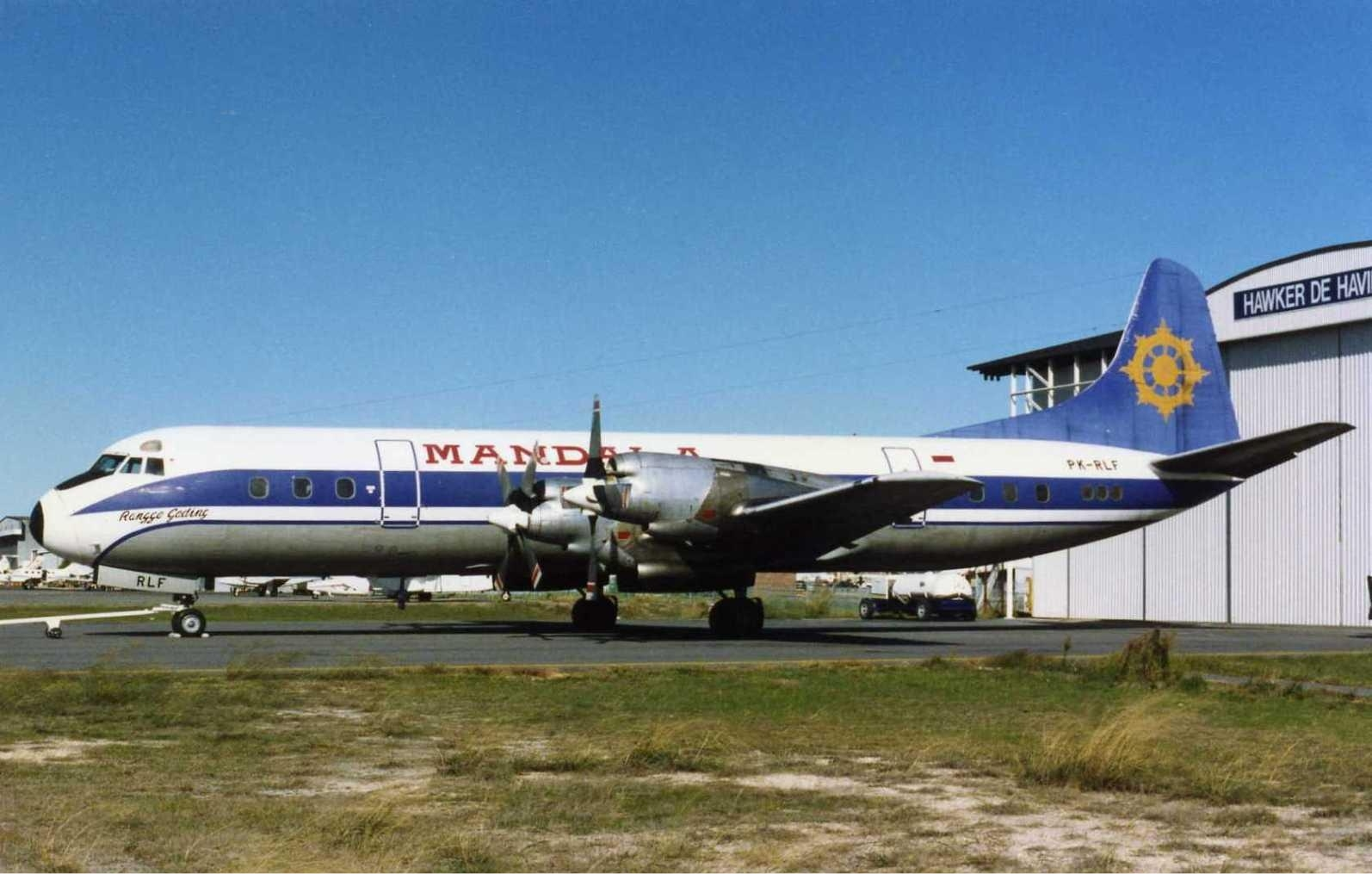
Mandala Lockheed L-188 Electra at Perth Airport (early 1990s)

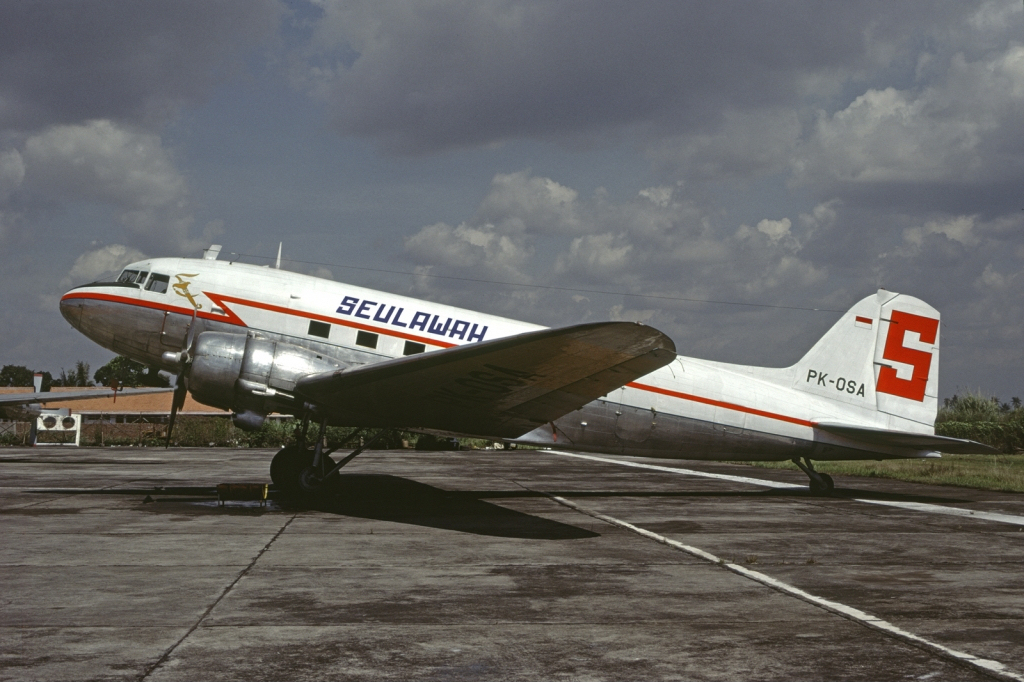
Seulawah Air Services Douglas DC-3 (1978)

PT Mandala Airlines was founded on April 17, 1969, by Col. Sofjar, Maj. Gen. Raden Soerjo, Adil Aljol, Maj. (Air Force) Soegandi Partosoegondo, Kasbi Indradjanoe and Darwin Ramli. The airline was owned by PT Dharma Kencana Sakti, which in turn was the commercial arm of Yayasan Dharma Putra Kostrad, a foundation linked to Kostrad, the strategic reserve command of the Indonesian army. The airline was named after Operation Mandala, the military operations to incorporate West Papua into Indonesia. The name also refers to the mandala, a Sanskrit term for a diagram symbolizing the universe, which is used as the logo of the corporation.

In its early years Mandala Airlines operated flights between Jakarta and destinations in eastern Indonesia, such as Ambon, Gorontalo, Kendari, Makassar and Manado. As of May 1971, the company's head office was in a building at Jl. Blora No.23 in Jakarta, and its fleet consisted of five turboprop airliners: three Vickers Viscount 800s and two Hawker Siddeley HS 748s. In 1972 Mandala took over Seulawah Air Services (another military-owned airline), which flew to cities in western Indonesia, such as Banda Aceh, Banjarmasin, Medan, Padang, Palembang, Pekanbaru and Pontianak, giving the airline a national coverage.

Under military management, Mandala Airlines kept a relatively quiet existence as a second-tier airline. In 1992, it retired the last of its aged turboprop fleet and replaced them with leased second hand jet aircraft. In 2001, it suffered a financial scandal, in which no less than IDR 135.5 billion (about US$13.5 million) was stolen from the company funds by a senior Kostrad officer.

Despite being awarded as Indonesia's "Most Potential Brand in Airlines Service" in 2002, Mandala found it hard to compete with other recently emerged Indonesian airlines. In September 2005, Mandala experienced a high-profile accident in Medan. At about the same month, political developments in Indonesia forced the military to divest itself of its businesses, resulting in Mandala Airlines being offered for sale. After the Indonesian government refused to take over Mandala Airlines, Cardig International acquired the airline for IDR 300 billion (US$34 million) in April 2006. Indigo Partners acquired 49% of Cardig's shares in October 2006.

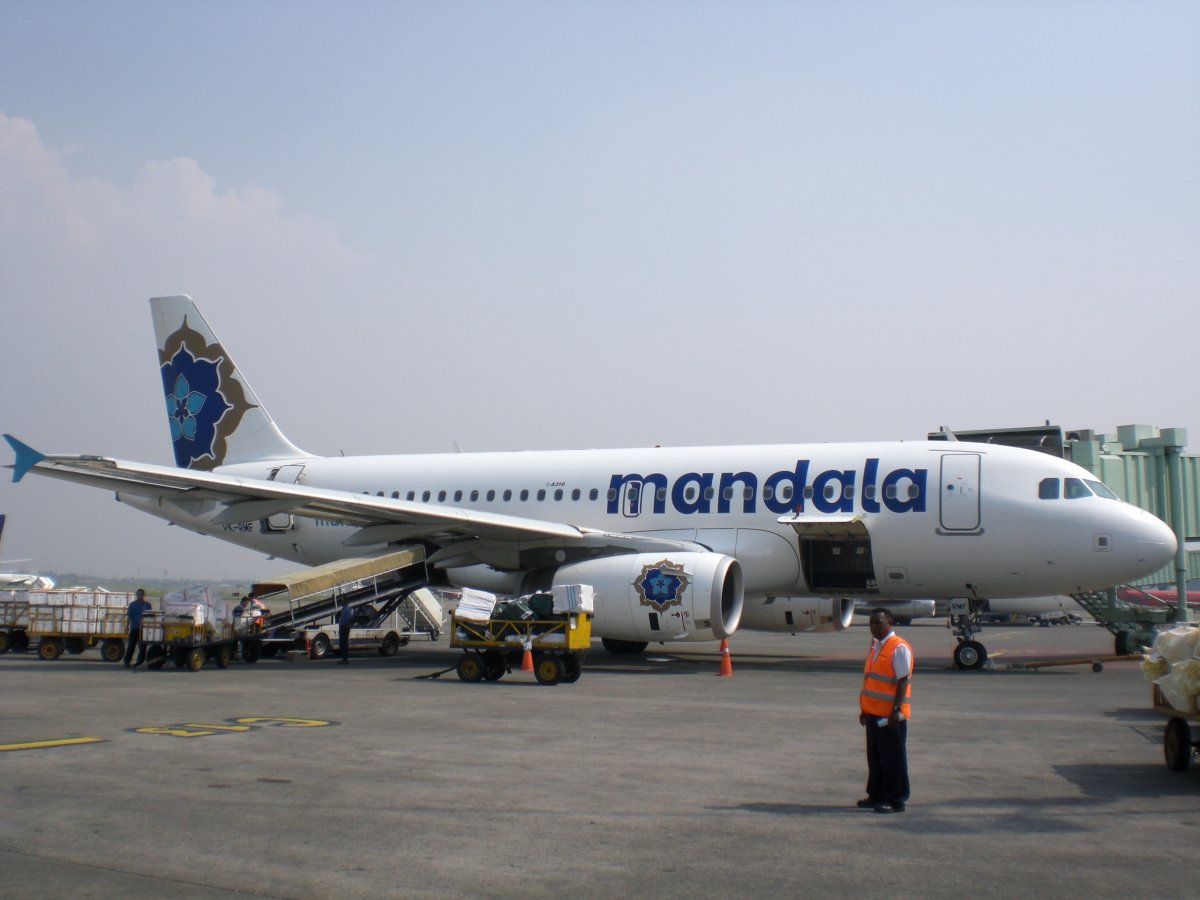
An Airbus A319-100 in pre-Tigerair livery (2008)

Within one year of its acquisition, Mandala Airlines transformed its image into a modern airline satisfying international standards of safety. It adopted the low-cost carrier model, in order to compete with other low-cost airlines in Indonesia. Mandala Airlines created a special niche among Indonesia's low-cost carriers by creating an image as a safe airline, taking advantage of the relatively young age of its fleet.

Mandala has now completed the IOSA (IATA Operational Safety Audit) of the International Air Transport Association (IATA), and other manufacturer audits. It contracted maintenance of its aircraft to Singapore Airlines Engineering Company (SIAEC). Its safety improvements were recognized by the European Union as Mandala was among four Indonesian airlines (the others were Garuda Indonesia, Airfast Indonesia and Premiair) officially struck from the EU airline ban list on July 14, 2009. Mandala is listed in Category 1 by the Indonesian Civil Aviation Authority for airline safety quality.

In January 2009, Mandala Airlines completed the phasing out of its older Boeing aircraft, replacing them with newer Airbuses. On April 20, 2009, Mandala moved its Jakarta operations to the new Terminal 3 of the Soekarno-Hatta International Airport. In April 2010, Mandala Airlines announced international services to Hong Kong, Macau and Singapore. These services started on June 25, 2010.

Shortly after services between Jakarta and Macau started on 21 July 2010, the airline announced that all flights between 22 and 29 August 2010 had been cancelled. Concerns were raised by some passengers that the company did not provide adequate information about the abrupt cancellations.

On January 13, 2011, Mandala Airlines temporarily stopped flying all of their fleet due to financial problems. In May 2011, Singapore-based Tiger Airways through Road Aviation Pte. Ltd. and Saratoga Investama, an Indonesian strategic investment company owned by Edwin Soeryadjaya, Patrick Walujo and Sandiaga Uno, announced their plans in a filing to the Singapore Stock Exchange. Tiger Airways was to acquire a 33 percent stake, while the Saratoga Group would buy 51 percent of Mandala. Mandala Airlines would focus on the low cost carrier (LCC) market because one of the shareholders, Tiger Airways, also runs an LCC operation.

The company was reported to have asked the commercial court to delay debt recovery action against the airline. The official application for postponement of debt payments to the Commercial Court has been filed for Rp.800 billion to about 271 creditors. At end of February 2011, the creditors had finally accepted the airline's debt settlement proposal to convert debt to equity. It was approved by 70.58 percent of total creditors from the total debt of Rp.2.4 trillion. After struggle with the funds, on September 24, 2011, the acquisition transaction was finally closed. Mandala would be back in the air 90 days after it, but certainly should got a new air operator certificate first during it. Two Mandala aircraft have been checked by the Transportation Ministry inspectors and Mandala Airlines have to resume service by February 15, 2012, or its AOC license would be revoked. Mandala will have 10 aircraft within one year.

Mandala resumed operations on Thursday 5 April 2012 as a partner airline of Tiger Airways, with one domestic route between its home base Jakarta and Medan, the capital of North Sumatra. This will be followed by its first international destination when it launches the Medan-Singapore route on 20 April 2012, adding a second Indonesian destination to Tiger's Singapore network after Jakarta. From May, Tiger Airways Mandala will also fly twice daily to Malaysia's capital Kuala Lumpur from Jakarta. Passengers holding on to Mandala tickets for flights after the company ceased operations in 2011 were offered a complimentary travel voucher redeemable through the company's new Tiger-based website.

On July 3, 2013, as part of the Tiger Airways Group, Mandala Airlines announced its transformation into ‘Tigerair Mandala’ (RI) in conjunction to Tiger Airways brand refresh to Tigerair. By operating under the new brand name, the airlines also adopted a new logo.

The change is also occurring to other airlines under the Tigerair Group, namely Tiger Airways to Tigerair (TR), Tiger Australia to Tigerair Australia (TT) and SEAIR to Tigerair Philippines (DG).

Tigerair Mandala ceased all operations on 1 July 2014, following the decision of the main shareholders to cease funding the airline. In December 2014, it filed for bankruptcy at the Central Jakarta Commercial Court. In February 2015, Mandala was officially bankrupt.

== Corporate identity ==
This version of the logo was used from 1969 to 2006.

Mandala Airlines logo from 2006 to 2012

The airline's logo is a golden eight-pointed mandala reflecting the eight characters of humanity and the eight elements in Javanese tradition, with a five-petaled lotus in its centre reflecting Indonesia's five-principled state ideology, Pancasila. A new logo was unveiled on November 1, 2006, emphasizing the new image of the corporation. The new logo, designed by Veronica Halim and Eddy Purwanto of Nuage Branding, keeps the mandala and lotus theme of the original, but has a more streamlined design.

The current livery of Mandala Airlines is a "Eurowhite" scheme, consisting of a white fuselage with a blue 'mandala' title. The company logo is applied on the tail and the outboard sides of engine nacelles. Mandala's previous livery was also a "eurowhite" scheme with a different typeface for the 'Mandala' title, a blue tail and the original logo. The airline's earliest scheme was a bare-metal lower and white upper fuselage with a blue cheatline across the cabin windows and a red 'MANDALA' title.

Other recent liveries used by Mandala Airlines include a gold and blue wavy scheme with a large billboard 'Mandala' title introduced in early 2008, a mainly-white scheme with gold and blue hockey stick stripes on the fuselage and a blue tail, and an all-white scheme.

Following its restructuring, the new hybrid Tiger Airways Mandala livery reflects its status as Tiger Airways' partner airline in Indonesia by keeping the blue 'mandala' title on the fuselage of the Airbus A320 but having its wingtips and logo on the tail replaced with Tiger's stripes and colors.

From 2013, the striped aircraft tail that used to be the main element of Tigerair Mandala's logo has made way for contemporary grey rounded font typography, with orange accents and an orange smile-looking tail.

== Destinations ==
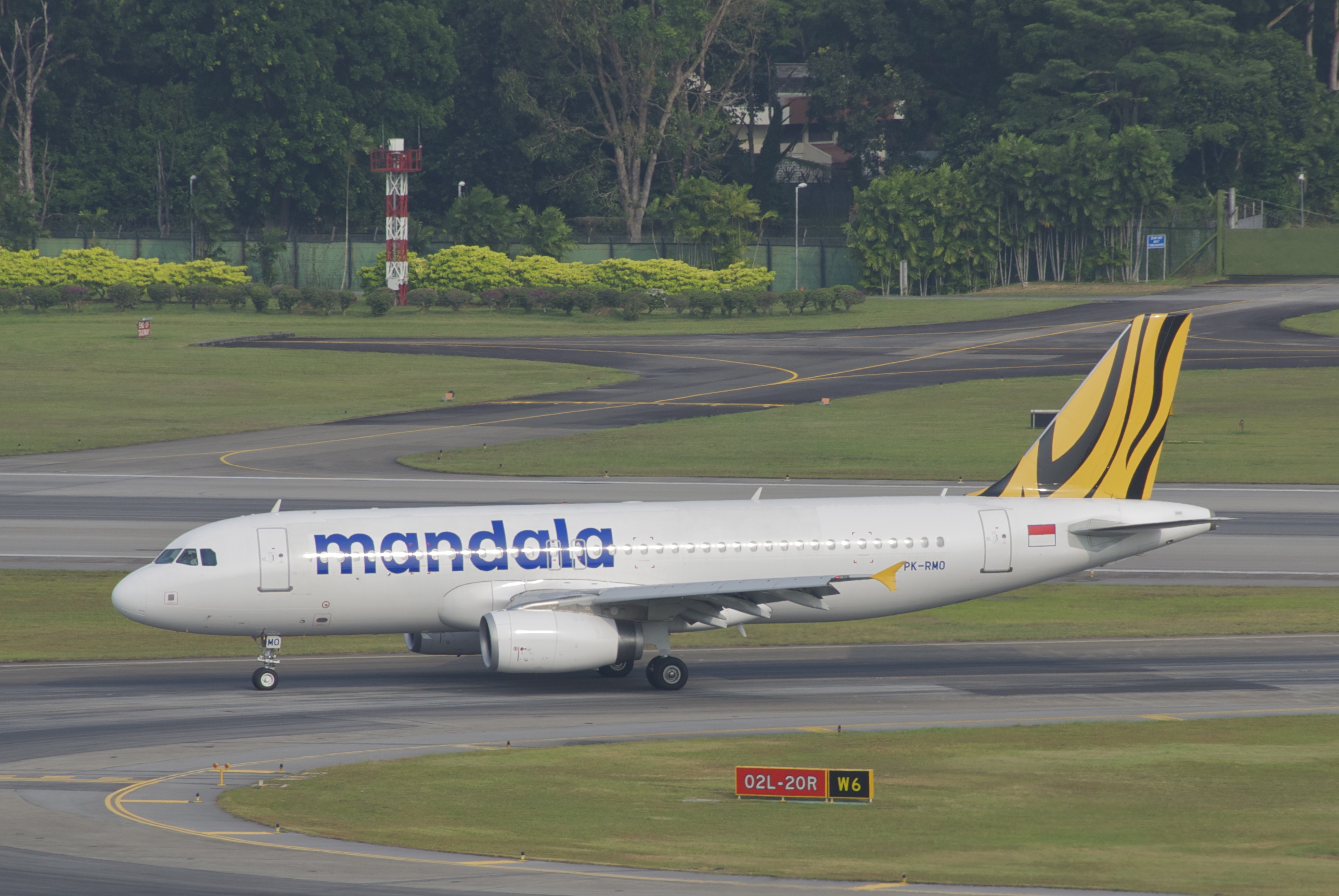
Mandala Airbus A320-200 in Tigerair livery (2012)

Tigerair Mandala resumed operations in 2012.

- Indonesia
  - Java
    - Jakarta - Soekarno-Hatta International Airport (base)
    - Surabaya - Juanda International Airport
    - Yogyakarta - Adisucipto International Airport
  - Bali
    - Bali-Denpasar - Ngurah Rai International Airport
  - Sumatra
    - Medan - Kuala Namu International Airport
    - Padang - Minangkabau International Airport
    - Palembang - Sultan Mahmud Badaruddin II International Airport
    - Pekanbaru - Sultan Syarif Kasim II International Airport (base)
- Hong Kong
  - Hong Kong – Hong Kong International Airport
- Singapore
  - Changi Airport (hub)
- Thailand
  - Bangkok - Suvarnabhumi Airport

== In-flight service ==
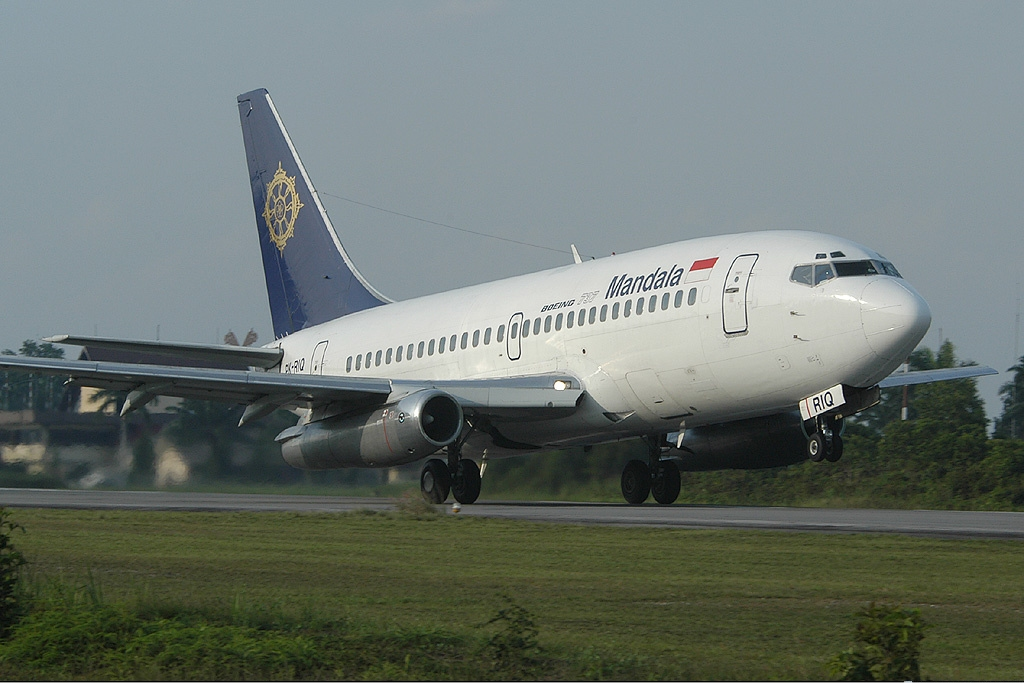
Mandala Airlines Boeing 737-200 landing at Sultan Syarif Kasim II Airport (2003)

Mandala Airlines adopts the same low-frills concept of Tigerair by offering a single class service on all its 180-seat Airbus A320 aircraft. There is a buy-on-board food and beverage service but no in-flight entertainment is offered, except for the in-flight magazine. Preferred seats can be reserved online during the booking process, otherwise they are allocated during airport check-in. Other ancillary services offered to passengers include Tiger's priority boarding "BoardMeFirst".

Under the old Mandala Priority Privileges program, the airline offered a baggage allowance of 20 kg (44 lb) per passenger, with an extra 5 kg (11 lb) for priority passengers. Priority passengers also benefited from choice seats at the front of the aircraft, free airport lounge access and free food and beverages in both lounges and in-flight.

== Ticketing ==
Following the restructuring which saw Tigerair become one of its key investors, passengers can make a booking from Tigerair website comprising airline tickets for Tigerair Singapore, Tigerair Australia, and Tigerair Philippines, as well as interline bookings with Scoot.

== Fleet ==
As of May 2014, two months before it ceased operations, the Tigerair Mandala fleet consisted of 13 Airbus A320-200s.

In prior years, the fleet included:

- Airbus A319
- Boeing 727-200
- Boeing 737-200
- Boeing 737-400
- Convair CV-600
- Fokker F28-3000
- Hawker Siddeley HS 748
- Lockheed L-188 Electra
- Vickers Viscount 800
- Antonov An-12

== Incidents and accidents ==
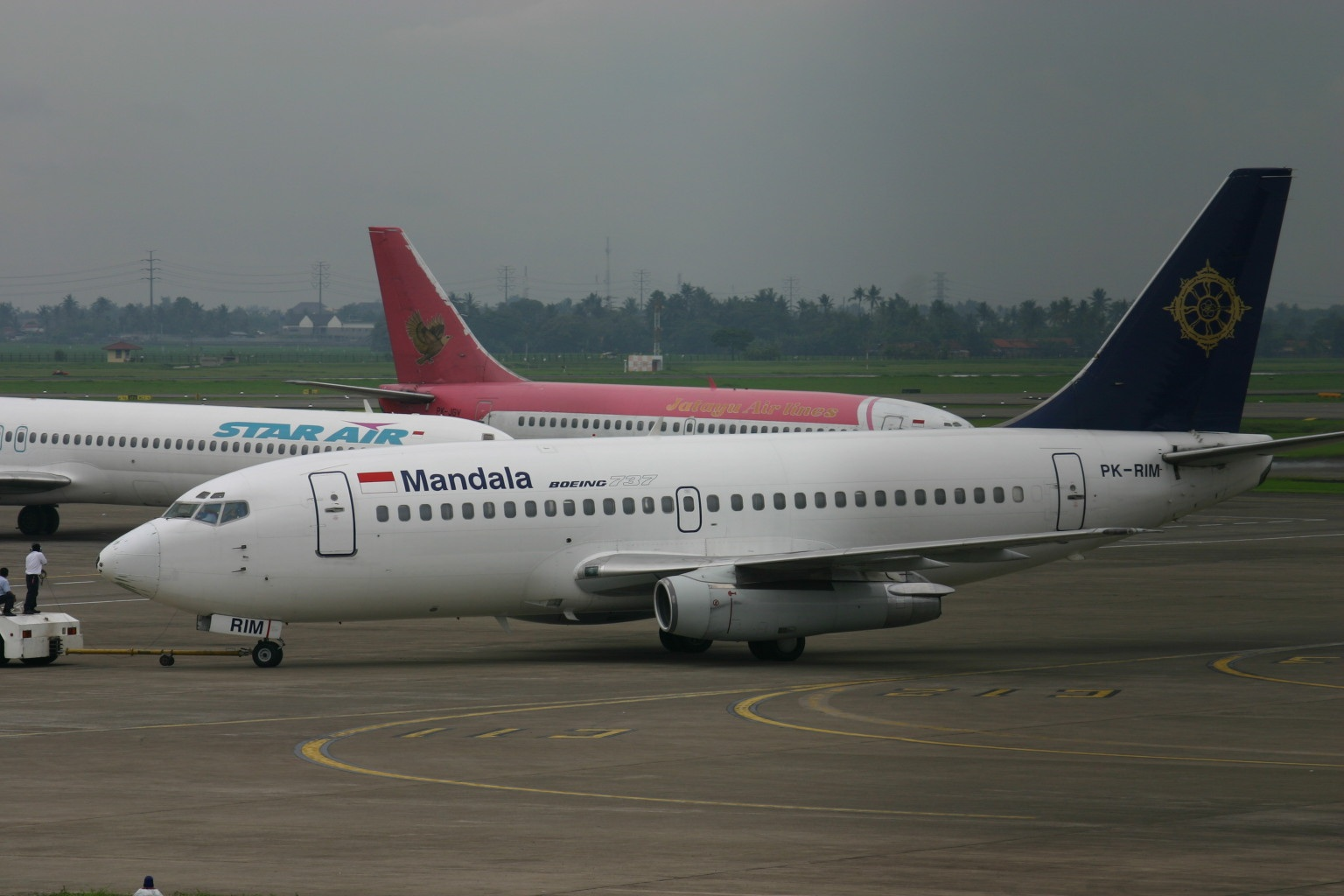
PK-RIM, the Boeing 737-230 Adv involved in the Mandala 91 crash, seen at Soekarno–Hatta International Airport, in 2004.

During its 40 years of operation, Mandala Airlines has experienced two significant accidents and several minor incidents. However, it has had no incidents after 2007, when it began to retire older aircraft and introduce newer ones. Unless otherwise stated, the incidents occurred at airports in Indonesia.

- February 1, 1975 - A Vickers Viscount 800 overran the runway during landing at Songshan Airport in Taipei, Taiwan, and ended up in a paddy field. There were no fatalities.
- January 7, 1976 - A Vickers Viscount, landing at Sam Ratulangi International Airport in intermittent slight rain, touched down 520 meters (1706 feet) down the runway, crossed a ditch and three drains before coming to rest 180 meters (591 feet) past the end of the runway. There were no fatalities.
- October 18, 1977 - A Hawker Siddeley HS 748 crashed in Manila, Philippines, during a certification flight. Two of three crew members were killed.
- May 1, 1981 - A Vickers Viscount ran off the runway at Jenderal Ahmad Yani International Airport, causing the right main gear and nose gear to collapse.
- January 13, 1985 - A Vickers Viscount belly-landed at Adisutjipto Airport. There were no fatalities but the aircraft was damaged beyond repair.
- November 30, 1985 - A Lockheed L-188 Electra had its main gear wheels separated when approaching for landing at Tabing Airport. The wheels fell through the roof of a watch repair shop. The aircraft was diverted to Medan for a wheels-up landing. All propellers broke off and the aircraft burst into flames after coming to rest. All 45 passengers and crew members survived, but the aircraft was damaged beyond repair.
- July 24, 1992 - Mandala Airlines Flight 660, a Vickers Viscount flying from Makassar to Ambon, crashed into Inahau Hill (located at Liliboy village, about 15 km (9.3 mi) west of the intended destination) while on an instrument approach in a heavy rainstorm. All 70 passengers and crew members were killed. At the time, it was Indonesia's third worst aviation accident.
- September 19, 1999 - A Antonov An-12 touched down 1300 meters short of runway 36 at Simpang Tiga Airport, breaking the plane in two. There were no fatalities in the incident.
- September 5, 2005 - Mandala Airlines Flight 091, a Boeing 737-200 departing for Jakarta, crashed seconds after taking off from Polonia International Airport. Out of 117 passengers and crew members, 100 died. One passenger died later from injuries sustained during the crash in a hospital. As the aircraft crashed into a heavily populated residential area, 49 persons on the ground were also killed, and at least 26 were injured. This accident is the fourth worst aviation accident in Indonesia, and also the world's worst accident involving a Boeing 737-200.
- October 3, 2006 - A Boeing 737-200 arriving from Balikpapan skidded 50 meters off the runway during landing at Juwata International Airport. There were no injuries. Visibility was below 400 meters at the time due to the ongoing 2006 Southeast Asian haze.
- December 18, 2006 - A Boeing 737-200 skidded off the runway at Abdul Rachman Saleh Airport due to adverse weather. No injuries were reported to the 77 passengers on board.
- November 1, 2007 - A Boeing 737-200 skidded when landing at Abdul Rachman Saleh Airport due to adverse weather. No serious injury occurred, but five people were slightly injured out of 89 passengers and crew members.

== See also ==
- Tigerair Australia
- Tigerair Philippines
- Tiger Airways Holdings
