= RIS =

RIS may refer to:

- Radio Information Service, a reading service for the blind in Pennsylvania, US
- Radiological information system, for the electronic management of information related to medical imaging
- Radiologically isolated syndrome, suggesting multiple sclerosis
- Rail Integration System, for attaching accessories on firearms
- Microsoft Remote Installation Services, booting computers via PXE
- Reparto Informazioni e Sicurezza, a military intelligence agency of Italy, see SIOS
- Republik Indonesia Serikat (Republic of the United States of Indonesia)
- RIS Info, later RDS Info, Canadian sports broadcaster
- Reverse Image Search
- Reviving the Islamic Spirit, an Islamic conference in Canada
- Riverside Indian School
- RIS (file format), for citation programs
- RIS Delitti Imperfetti, an Italian TV series
- R. I. S. – Die Sprache der Toten, a German TV series
- R.I.S, police scientifique, a French TV series
- Rishiri Airport, Japan, IATA airport code
- Rishton railway station, England, station code
- Ruamrudee International School, Thailand
- Russian imperial stout, a strong dark beer

== See also ==
- ris (disambiguation)
- R1S, an SUV by Rivian
- RI (disambiguation)
