= RI =

RI or ri may refer to:

== People ==
- Ri, a common Korean surname, a variant romanization of Lee
- Rí (rig), an ancient Gaelic word meaning "king"
- Ri (pronoun), a gender-neutral pronoun in Esperanto
- RI, an initialism of Rex Imperator (king-emperor) or Regina Imperatrix (queen-empress), used by those British monarchs who were rulers of both the United Kingdom and the Indian Empire

== Places ==
- Ri (administrative division), an administrative unit in both North Korea and South Korea
- Ri, Orne, a commune of the Orne département in France
- RI, abbreviation of either the Republic of Indonesia or, in the Indonesian language, Republik Indonesia
- Rhode Island, a state within the US (postal abbreviation RI)
- Rijeka, city in Croatia

== Arts and media ==
- Ri, an augmented second in solfege, used in music education
- Ri, a representation of the second svara in Indian classical music
- Russia Insider, a pro-Kremlin news and propaganda website

== Businesses and organizations ==
- Raffles Institution, a school in Singapore
- Refugees International, an international humanitarian organization
- Rehabilitation International, an international disability rights organization
- Rotary International, international organization of business and professional leaders focused on non-political and non-sectarian humanitarian service
- Royal Institution of Great Britain, an organisation devoted to scientific education and research
- Royal Institute of Painters in Water Colours, a society in the Federation of British Artists
- Chicago, Rock Island and Pacific Railroad (reporting mark RI)
- Tigerair Mandala (IATA airline designator RI)
- Italian Radicals, a political party in Italy

== Science, technology, and mathematics ==
- Ri (prefix symbol), a binary unit prefix symbol
- Reference Intake, a food labelling system
- Referential integrity, a database concept
- Refractive index of an optical medium (in physics/optics) is a number that describes how light propagates through that medium
- Arterial resistivity index, a measure of pulsatile blood flow
- Ring Indicator, a signal in the RS232 serial communications standard
- Rhombicosahedron, a polyhedron, by Bowers acronym
- Residual income, a financial profitability measure of a company
- Reputation Institute, a research and insights company that analyzes the reputation of corporations and places
- Rapid intensification, a phenomenon in which the wind speed of a tropical cyclone increases dramatically in a short period of time
- Research institute, an establishment founded for doing research

== Other uses ==
- Ri (cuneiform), a cuneiform sign
- Ri (kana), a Romanization of the Japanese kana り and リ
- Ri, a unit of measurement in Japan and Korea related to the Chinese li
- Rock Island District, a commuter rail line on Chicago's Metra (abbreviated as RI on maps and schedules)

== See also ==
- Isaac ben Samuel, known as the Ri ha-Zaken, a 12th-century French tosafist and Biblical commentator
- Riri (disambiguation)
- Ris (disambiguation)
- IR (disambiguation)
