= Tigerair Australia =

Low-cost airline of Australia (2007–2020)

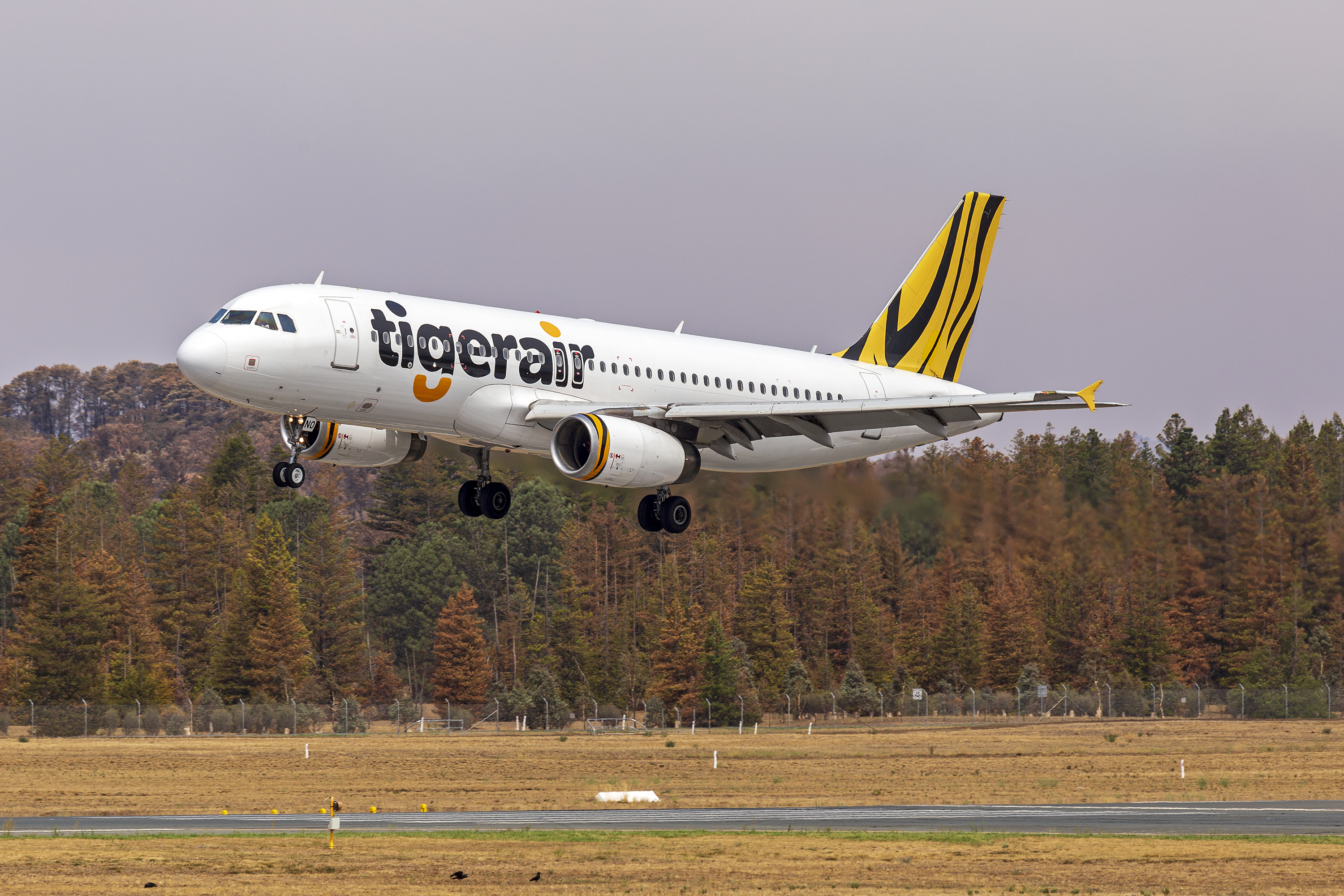
- Tigerair Airbus A320-200
IATA	ICAO	Call sign
TT	TGG	TIGGOZ
- Commenced operations: 23 November 2007
- Ceased operations: 25 March 2020
- Operating bases: Adelaide (2009–2011); Avalon (2010–2011); Brisbane (2014–); Melbourne (2007–); Sydney (2012–)
- Frequent-flyer program: Virgin Velocity (redemptions only)
- Alliance: Value Alliance (2016–2018)
- Parent company: Tiger Airways Holdings (2007–2014); Virgin Australia Holdings (2014–2020)
- Headquarters: Melbourne, Victoria, Australia
- Key people: Paul Scurrah (managing director)

Tiger Airways Australia Pty Ltd, operating as Tigerair Australia, was an Australian low-cost airline. Founded by Tiger Airways Holdings, it commenced services in the domestic airline market on 23 November 2007 as Tiger Airways Australia. It later became a subsidiary of Virgin Australia Holdings. On 25 March 2020, Tigerair suspended all operations as a result of the COVID-19 pandemic. Following Virgin Australia Holdings going into voluntary administration and later sold, new owner Bain Capital confirmed the brand would be retired.

== History ==
Former Tiger Airways Australia branding

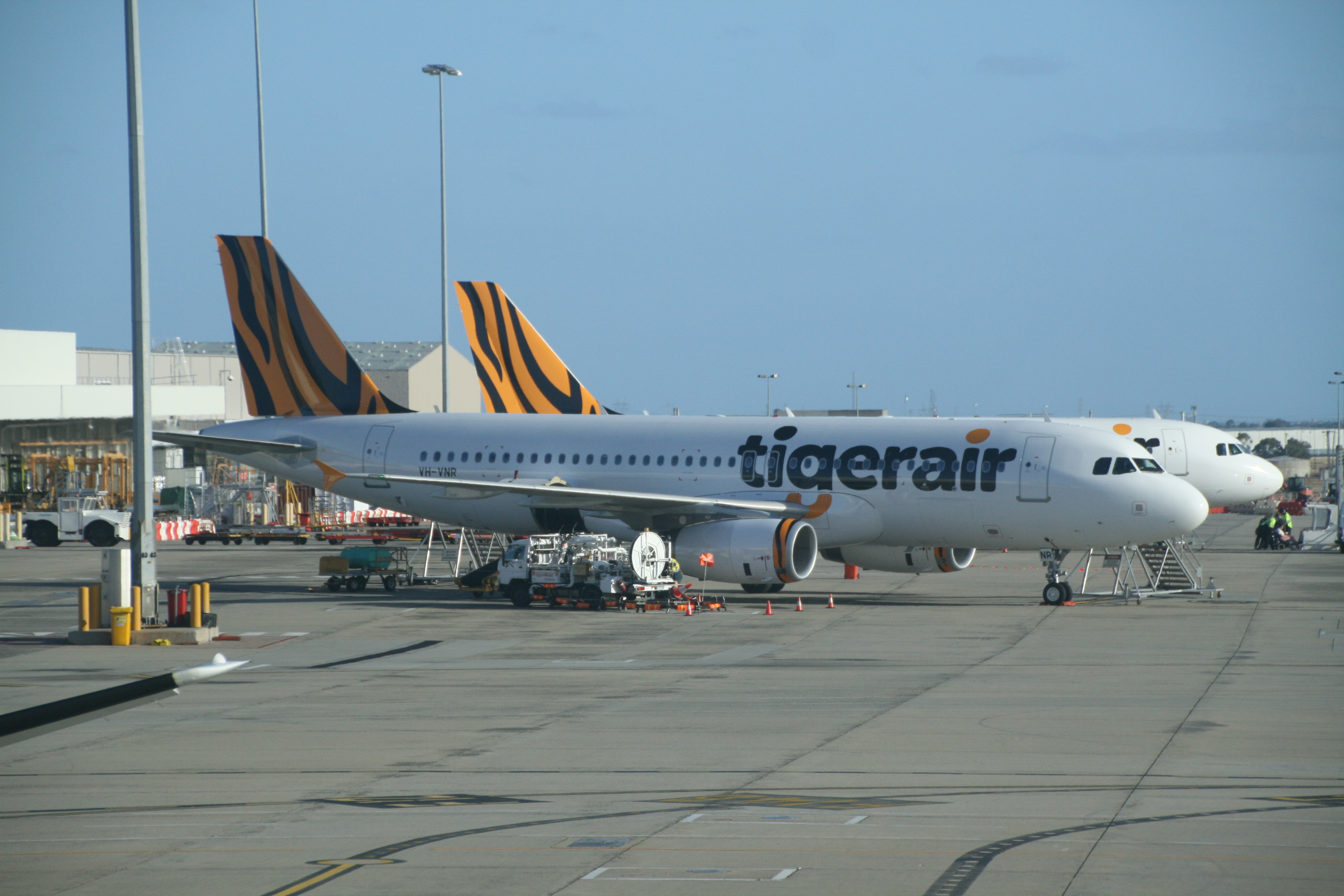
Tigerair Australia Airbus A320-200 wearing the new colour scheme at Melbourne Airport in 2014

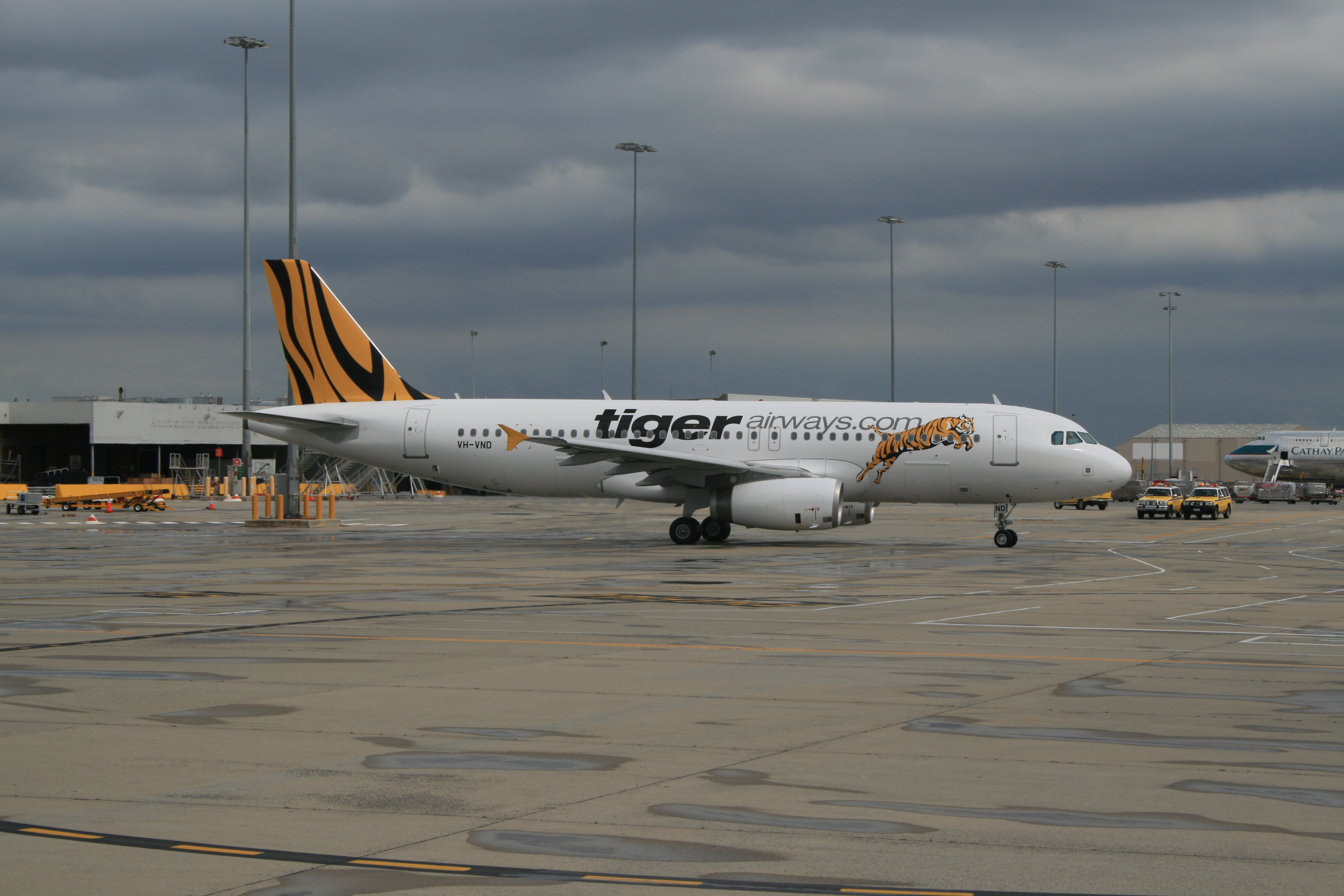
Tiger Airways Australia Airbus A320-200 at Melbourne Airport in 2007

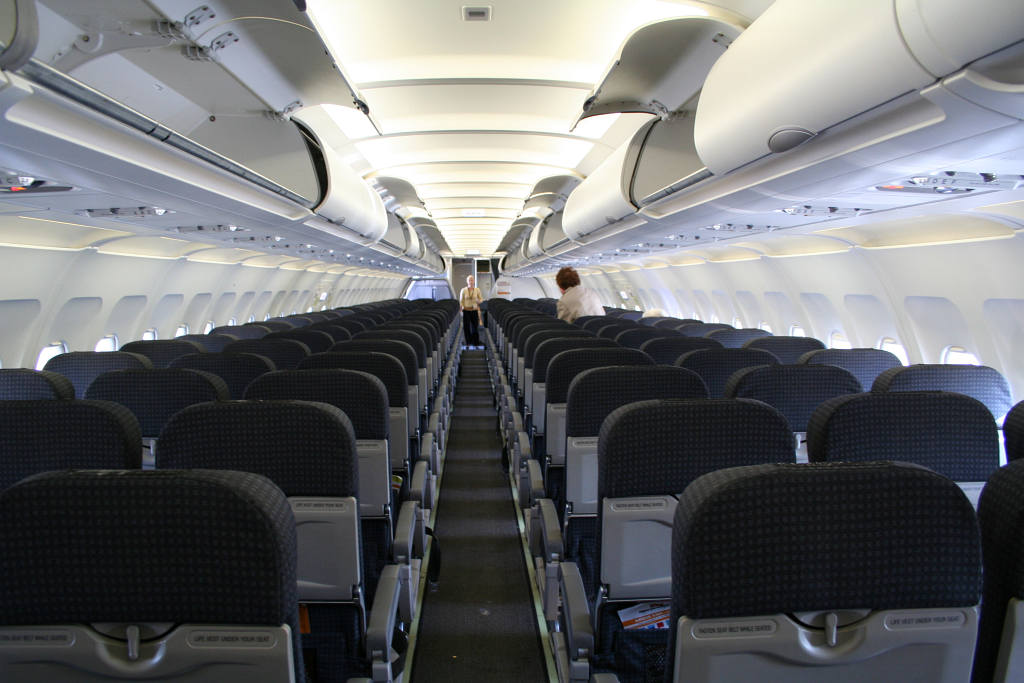
Interior of a Tiger Airways Australia Airbus A320-200 in 2008

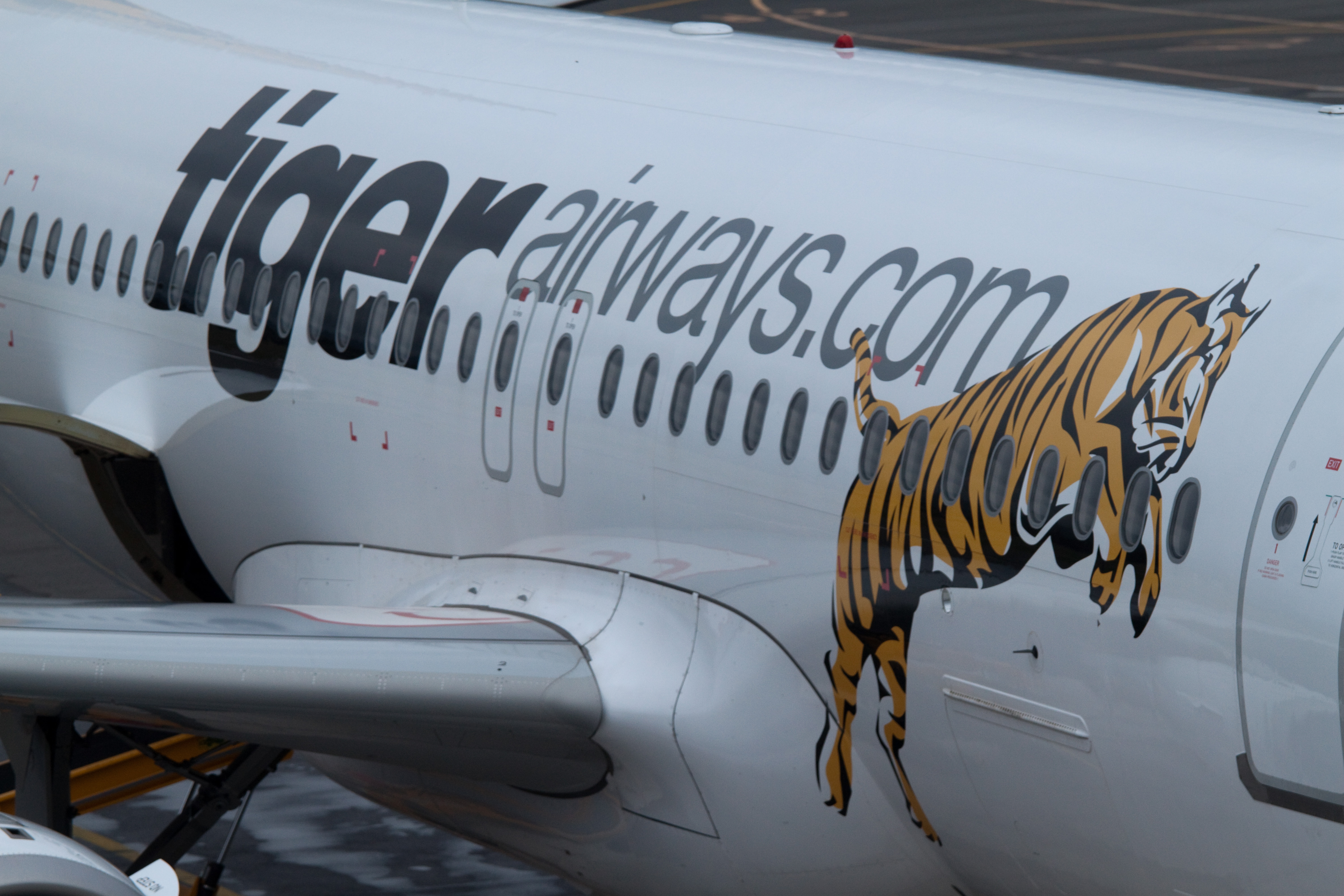
Tiger Airways Australia Airbus A320-200 fuselage in 2009

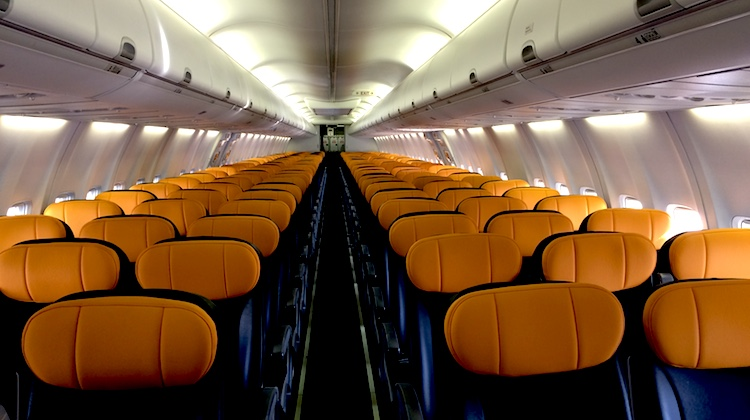
Interior of Tigerair Australia Boeing 737-800 (2016). The type was operated for the airline by Virgin Australia.

Australian government policy and legislation currently permits airlines that are 100% foreign-owned to operate domestic airline services within the country. The change in regulations originally applied only to New Zealand-owned airlines in 1996, but were later relaxed, resulting in the establishment of Virgin Australia. Australian international airlines are still subject to ownership rules that limit foreign ownership to 49%.

The Foreign Investment Review Board gave approval for Tiger Airways Holdings to establish a wholly owned Australian subsidiary in March 2007 without any special conditions. On 16 March 2007, Tiger Airways Australia Pty Ltd was incorporated in the Northern Territory, although the company was based in Melbourne, with Melbourne Airport being the airline's major hub.

Five aircraft and $10 million were committed to start the subsidiary. The airline's business model was based on that of sister airline Tiger Airways in Singapore, which included attempting to increase the total market size (number of passengers), control operating costs, and maximise the number of sectors served. One way it planned to keep costs low was by avoiding expensive airports.

Tiger undertook the final stage of Australian regulatory procedures on 20 November 2007, successfully performing two proving flights from Melbourne to the Sunshine Coast and Launceston. Each carried officials from the Civil Aviation Safety Authority (CASA) as well as Tiger crew. Tiger received its Air Operator's Certificate on 22 November. The airline projected initial traffic of two million passengers annually.

Tiger Airways Australia's first scheduled flight was TT 7402, which departed from Melbourne for the Gold Coast on 23 November 2007. The airline managed services out of a single base – Melbourne Airport.

On 31 May 2008, the airline announced that passengers would be charged a fee for checked-in luggage. The fee was $10 (for 15 kg of luggage) at booking or $20 at check-in.

Tiger announced on 3 April 2009 its intention to launch in the Melbourne–Sydney market, the fifth busiest passenger route in the world at the time, signalling an end to its operational policy of avoiding expensive airports. On 18 July, Tiger announced an increase in its Melbourne–Sydney flights by up to nine flights a day in each direction, and doubling the capacity on the Adelaide–Sydney route. New aircraft were expected to arrive starting on 4 October 2009. On 5 November 2009, Tiger Airways announced its intention to launch into the Brisbane market with services to Melbourne, Adelaide and Rockhampton. Tiger celebrated these routes for $2 during its Second Birthday sale, along with all Tasmanian routes and the popular Melbourne- Sydney route.

Tiger Australia announced in February 2010 that the airline was now profitable.

Former MD Shelley Roberts departed on 1 June 2010. Her successor was Crawford Rix. "As far as I am concerned, on-time performance is going to be a big area that we will be focusing on," said Rix in a media interview.

On 16 July 2010, Tiger Airways announced its intention to cease flying from Launceston Airport as of 2 August 2010. The Adelaide–Hobart route was also to be suspended. On 16 September 2010, Tiger commenced services to Cairns, operating a late night daily service from Melbourne. On 21 October 2010, Tiger announced that it was adding two Airbus A320 aircraft to the Melbourne base in the new year, bringing its Victorian fleet to a total of ten aircraft, in line with a deal struck with the State government. Tiger announced on 25 October 2010 its intention of completing the 'golden triangle' by expanding onto the busy Sydney–Brisbane route, offering double daily frequencies.

On 7 March 2012, Tiger Airways announced that it would reopen a second base at Sydney Airport On 4 September 2012, Tiger announced it was resuming flights from Melbourne to Adelaide, beginning from 1 November 2012.

In October 2012, Virgin Australia Holdings announced its intention to purchase 60% of Tiger Airways Australia. The deal was completed in July 2013, after the airline had changed its name to Tigerair Australia.

On 18 December 2012, Tiger began direct return flights from Mackay to Melbourne and Sydney. On 6 February 2013, Tiger Airways Australia announced it would resume services between Melbourne and Sunshine Coast/Alice Springs, and begin services between Sydney and Cairns/Alice Springs. Just over a week later, Tiger Airways Australia began its first intrastate route, from Sydney to Coffs Harbour.

On 17 October 2014, Virgin Australia Holdings announced plans to acquire the remaining 40% of Tigerair for $1. Virgin retained the Tigerair name and acquired the brand rights for Tigerair to operate to some international destinations from Australia.

On 7 August 2015, it was announced that Tigerair Australia would begin operating its first ever international services to Denpasar from Melbourne, Adelaide and Perth, beginning from 23 March 2016. On 18 August 2015, Tigerair moved into the newly opened Terminal 4 at Melbourne Airport, which features new technology automated check-in kiosks and bag drop facilities, as well as an expanded departure lounge and more shopping and food choices. On 27 August 2015, Tigerair Australia announced three weekly return services between Melbourne and Coffs Harbour. On 2 March 2016, the airline announced an additional weekly return service between the two locations. On 22 October 2015, Tigerair revealed a new look for the airline, featuring new uniforms, website, booking system and an improved check-in experience.

On 9 December 2016, Tigerair resumed flights between Canberra and Melbourne after a gap of five years.

On 3 February 2017, Tigerair ended flights to Bali, started 11 months before on 23 March 2016, citing approval issues with Indonesian authorities. On 14 September 2017, Tigerair added a new Canberra–Brisbane domestic route with three weekly return services.

On 2 September 2019, Virgin Australia Holdings Managing Director and CEO Paul Scurrah unveiled a new organisational structure for his executive leadership team designed to bring the three flying businesses – Virgin Australia, Virgin Australia Regional Airlines (VARA) and Tigerair Australia – closer together. Under this structure, the position of CEO Tigerair ceased to exist, with the operations of Tigerair being led by an Executive General Manager accountable for the relevant Air Operator's Certificate and reporting to the VAH Chief Operations Officer, and commercial and corporate functions reporting centrally within the Group.

In February 2020, Virgin Australia Holdings announced it would reduce Tigerair's fleet from 13 to eight, exit five loss-making routes, and close its Brisbane base. Operations were suspended on 25 March 2020 as a result of the COVID-19 epidemic. On 3 April, all pilots were made redundant. Following Virgin Australian Holdings being placed in administration and later sold, new owner Bain Capital confirmed the brand would be retired. Tigerair was officially discontinued by Bain on 10 September 2020. Its Air Operator's Certificate was retained for potential revival.

Operators such as Rex Airlines and Bonza came into its market but later failed, sparking the market being labeled 'in crisis' by the Transport Workers Union of Australia. Bonza went into liquidation, while Rex Airlines' attempt to compete in the key city-city market caused the airline to go into administration in mid-2024.

=== Competitors' reactions ===
The arrival of Tiger Airways Australia in the market resulted in varied responses from its primary competitors, mainly Qantas (and its subsidiary Jetstar) and Virgin Australia. Jetstar was particularly vocal, with its then chief executive Alan Joyce quoted as saying "Tiger and what they have done have come across as a joke, and will probably continue that way". He claimed that Tiger was losing over SGD$60 million over the previous two years of operations out of Singapore.

Air fares began to drop as special offers and other promotions were launched, such as Jetstar's announcement that it would "double the difference of any competitor's fare that is cheaper than its own fares". This was soon followed by a bonus system to entice its customers to stay with the airline.

Tiger Airways Australia had previously been quoted as planning to offer "single-digit" one-way fares when it began service. The announcement of $80 flights from Melbourne to Darwin was met with criticism from Jetstar.

Virgin Australia considered the possibility of establishing a low-cost offshoot to fend off Tiger Airways.

In a bid to increase its share of low-cost traffic, Melbourne Airport announced plans to cut usage fees soon after Tiger's announcement of establishing a hub there. Tiger's mention of New Zealand as a potential market raised concerns in that country.

Just days before the launch of Tiger Airways Australia, Jetstar offered 5,000 seats on 21 November 2007 for the price of five cents, inclusive of taxes, on seven domestic routes, costing the airline $25 per seat. Jetstar claimed that the sale has nothing to do with the Tiger launch, while at the same time referring to them as "competitive". Jetstar's spokesman, Simon Westaway, was quoted as saying that Tiger Airways "are a good airline in their own right. We are not going head to head. We respect them for the competitor that they are going to be".

On 23 November 2007, Tiger Airways criticised Qantas for being unable to provide ground handling services to the airline at Alice Springs Airport, forcing it to delay its launch to the city by three months to 1 March 2008. The airline had promised to pay any cost to Qantas, but services were still denied. Qantas executive general manager John Borghetti responded by saying "assisting competitors is not part of my job description".

Tiger Airways Australia celebrated its first anniversary on 19 November 2008 with a "Free Seats" campaign, which resulted in 100,000 seats on sale, of which half sold out within the first few hours. The airline celebrated its second birthday on 23 November 2009 with thousands of seats on sale for $2.

== Company affairs and identity ==
=== Ownership ===
Tiger Airways Australia was founded by Tiger Airways Holdings. In October 2012, Virgin Australia Holdings announced it had agreed terms to purchase a 60% stake in Tigerair Australia for $35 million. Tigerair and Virgin said they would spend up to $62.5 million on Tiger Australia to increase its fleet from 11 aircraft to 35 by 2018. Tiger would operate as a low-cost subsidiary of Virgin Australia. On 23 April 2013, the Australian Competition & Consumer Commission ACCC announce that it would not oppose the sale. ACCC chairman Rod Sims said that Tigerair would be "highly unlikely to remain in the local market if the proposed acquisition didn't proceed". In October 2014, Virgin Australia Holdings purchased the remaining 40% of Tigerair Australia.

=== Performance ===
The airline statistics for the 2012–2013 year showed that of the major Australian domestic airlines (Qantas, Jetstar, Virgin Australia, Tigerair), Tigerair achieved the second lowest level of on-time departures for 2012–13 at 79.6%, a significant drop from 2011 to 2012 figure of 89.5%, but ahead of Jetstar at 75.6%. This result was also reflected in arrival performance, where Tigerair achieved an on-time arrival rate of 76.3%, ahead of Jetstar at 76.1%. In the same period for the major domestic airlines, Tigerair had the lowest cancellation rate for the 2012–2013 year, at 1.2% of flights cancelled.

The airline statistics for 2015 revealed that 84.1% of Tigerair Australia services departed on time in 2015, a record for the airline over the course of a year. In comparison, Tigerair's main competitor departed on schedule 76.2% of the time on like-for-like routes. On like-for-like routes, Tigerair Australia was also three times more reliable than its key competitor when it came to cancellations in 2015. Tigerair Australia cancelled 0.9% of flights in 2015, compared to 2.9% for the key competitor on the same routes. Tigerair Australia recorded the airline's best ever on time departure statistics in February 2016, with 93.3% of services departing on time.

=== 2011 warnings and suspension ===
On 11 February, erroneous data was suspected to have been put into a flight computer.

On 3 March, a traffic collision avoidance system alarm was triggered after one of Tigerair's A320s flew too close to a smaller aircraft. Following this, Tigerair was issued with a "show-cause" notice for pilot training and maintenance. Spokeswoman Vanessa Regan told news media that "There is no cause for concern. CASA has taken no action. We continue to operate and we want to reassure our customers that there is no risk to safety and we continue as normal".

On 7 June, a Tigerair aircraft descended below the minimum altitude near Melbourne Airport. On 30 June, another Tigerair aircraft flew below the published minimum altitude near Avalon Airport. On 1 July, a further Tigerair A320 flying from Brisbane to Melbourne flew too close to a Boeing 767.

On 2 July, Tigerair Australia was suspended from flying by CASA due to "various" safety concerns. The grounding coincided with school holidays in New South Wales and Victoria. News agencies estimated that 35,000 people could have been affected. It is estimated that Tigerair would lose $4.2 million for every week of suspension.

Special conditions were imposed on its Air Operator Certificate giving Tigerair 60 days from mid June to complete instrument rating renewals. This direction was extended to all of its pilots.

A spokesperson for CASA, Peter Gibson, told the media that "Tigerair has not been able to, at this stage, convince us that they can continue operations safely, so that's why they're on the ground". Citing a view that future problems would also occur, he also commented that "We [CASA] believe this is symptomatic of problems within the airline [and] we've put them on the ground while we consider all these issues", Tigerair had also stated that it was co-operating fully with CASA.

On 6 July, CASA announced that it would lodge a request for extension to the suspension until 1 August at the Federal Court in Melbourne, while CASA continued to investigate, after the investigation raised more questions into Tiger Airways Australia, and until CASA was satisfied that the airline "no longer poses a serious and imminent risk to air safety". Consumer regulators, such as the ACCC, warned Tigerair Australia that the airline needed to inform customers who purchased tickets about the uncertainty as to whether the airline would be flying from 9 July. Tigerair Australia suspended its ticket sales on 5 July, however the ACCC's chairman, Graeme Samuel, stated that Tigerair Australia's "lack of response until that point was far from satisfactory".

After five weeks CASA lifted the ban and Tigerair Australia recommenced operations on 12 August, but only for 18 flights a day between Melbourne and Sydney. Tigerair announced it was suspending operations from Avalon Airport and would close its Adelaide base altogether in a "commercially motivated" decision. It also said that it would reduce its fleet to eight aircraft.

On 22 October 2012 CASA announced it was issuing a new safety certificate and lifting all restrictions placed on Tigerair Australia, as it was now satisfied the restrictions were no longer needed.

=== Television series ===
The Air Ways TV series created by the Seven Network followed the day-to-day operations of the airline. It had a similar premise to the successful UK factual television series Airline. The series, while not always portraying Tigerair in a positive light, did much to promote the airline. The TV programme was axed in 2012 due to low ratings.

== Destinations ==
=== Expansion of bases ===
Tigerair Australia recommenced services in 2011 out of a single base in Melbourne. In July 2012, a second base was opened at Sydney Airport. A third operating base was then opened at Brisbane Airport in March 2014.

=== International services ===
Tigerair Australia expanded into short-haul international flights when Virgin Australia transferred some of its services between Melbourne, Adelaide and Perth and Denpasar on the Indonesian island of Bali to Tigerair from 23 March 2016. These services use three Boeing 737-800 aircraft, wet leased from Virgin Australia and using Virgin's air operator's certificate and flight crew, with Tigerair providing the cabin crew. On 3 February 2017, Tigerair ended flights to Bali, citing approval issues with Indonesian authorities.

On 16 May 2016, Tigerair Australia joined Value Alliance, the world's largest low-cost carrier alliance. The new alliance was started alongside the Philippines' Cebu Pacific, South Korea's Jeju Air, Thailand's Nok Air and NokScoot, Singapore's Tigerair and Scoot, and Japan's Vanilla Air. It left the alliance in 2018.

In November 2016, Tigerair sought approval to operate expanded international services under its own air operator's certificate using both A320s and 737s.

Tigerair served seven destinations as of March 2020:

Country	City	Airport	Notes	Refs
Australia	Adelaide	Adelaide Airport	Terminated	
Australia	Alice Springs	Alice Springs Airport	Terminated	
Australia	Brisbane	Brisbane Airport	Base	
Australia	Cairns	Cairns Airport	Terminated	
Australia	Canberra	Canberra Airport	Terminated	
Australia	Coffs Harbour	Coffs Harbour Airport	Terminated	
Australia	Darwin	Darwin Airport	Terminated	
Australia	Gold Coast	Gold Coast Airport	Terminated	
Australia	Hobart	Hobart Airport	Terminated	
Australia	Launceston	Launceston Airport	Terminated	
Australia	Mackay	Mackay Airport	Terminated	
Australia	Melbourne	Melbourne Airport	Base	
Australia	Melbourne/Geelong	Avalon Airport	Terminated	
Australia	Newcastle	Newcastle Airport	Terminated	
Australia	Perth	Perth Airport	Terminated	
Australia	Proserpine	Whitsunday Coast Airport	Terminated	
Australia	Rockhampton	Rockhampton Airport	Terminated	
Australia	Sunshine Coast	Sunshine Coast Airport	Terminated	
Australia	Sydney	Sydney Airport	Base	
Australia	Townsville	Townsville Airport	Terminated	
Indonesia	Denpasar	Ngurah Rai International Airport	Terminated	

== Fleet ==
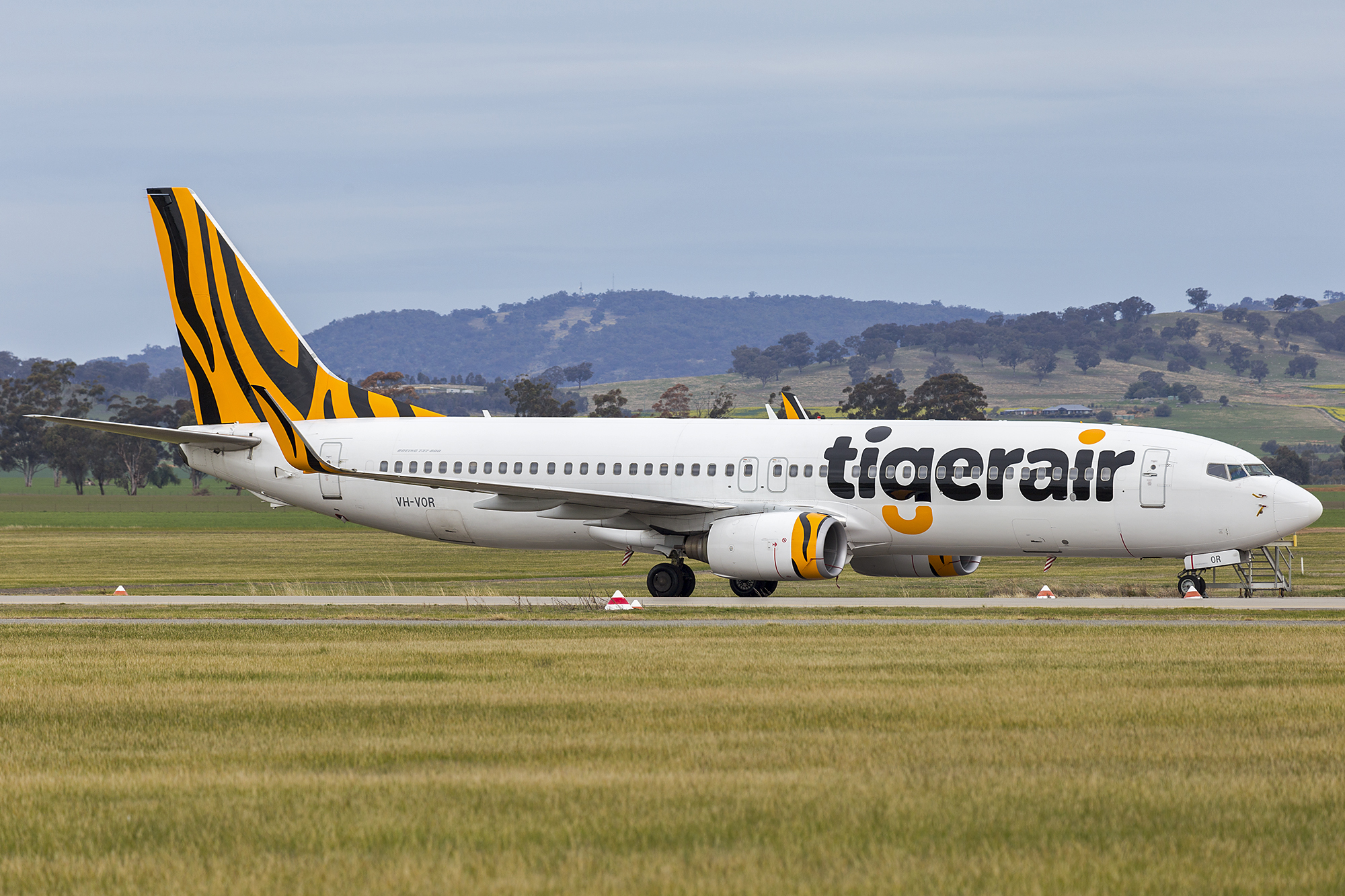
Tigerair Boeing 737-800

In July 2016, Tigerair Australia announced that the entire A320 fleet would be replaced with Boeing 737-800s.

At the cessation of services in March 2020, the Tigerair Australia fleet consisted of the following aircraft:

Tigerair Australia fleet
Aircraft	Number	Passengers	Notes
Boeing 737-800	6	186	
Airbus A320-200	7	180	7 aircraft had left the fleet prior to the cessation of services.
Total	13		

== See also ==
- List of defunct airlines of Australia
- Aviation in Australia
