= Riri =

Riri may refer to:

== People ==
- Riri (Japanese singer) (born 1999; as Riri Arai)
- Riri Fitri Sari (born 1970) computer engineering professor
- Riri Kusumoto (born 1996) member of Japanese girl idol group Yumemiru Adolescence
- Riri Riza (born 1970) Indonesian filmmaker
- Rihanna (born 1988; as Robyn Rihanna Fenty) Barbadian singer; nicknamed "RiRi"

== Fictional characters ==
- Riri Hitotsuyanagi a character from the Japanese media franchise Assault Lily
- Riri Williams (Marvel Comics) aka Ironheart
- Riri (folk character) a character from the legend of Tana and Riri
- Satō Rirī (videogame character) a character from the faux-Japanese visual novel Katawa Shoujo

== Music ==
- "RiRi", a song by Young Thug from his 2016 mixtape Jeffery
- "Riri", a song by Aminé from his 2020 album Limbo
- "Riri", a song by Young Miko from her 2022 EP Trap Kitty
- Riri, 2018 album by Riri

== Other uses ==
- Riri-tuna-rai the goddess of the coconut in the mythology of Easter Island
- Tana and Riri Indian story about two girls born around 1564, who were asked to sing in the court of Akbar

== See also ==
- RI (disambiguation)
