= Riss =

Riss or RISS may refer to:

== People ==
- Riss (surname)
- Riss (cartoonist) (born 1966), pen name of French cartoonist, author and publisher Laurent Sourisseau, majority owner of the satirical newspaper Charlie Hebdo
- Iris or Riss Long, founder and member of The Lana Sisters, a British vocal group (1958–1961)

== Places ==
- Riss (river), Germany
- Riss Lake, Missouri, United States, a reservoir

== RISS ==
- Regional Information Sharing Systems, an American information-sharing program for law enforcement

== See also ==
- Riss glaciation
- Rizz (disambiguation)
- Ris (disambiguation)
- Ríos (disambiguation)
