= Riz Ab =

Riz Ab or Rizab (Persian: ريزاب) may refer to:

- Rizab, Nishapur, Razavi Khorasan Province
- Riz Ab, South Khorasan
- Rizab Rural District, in Fars Province
