= Riz Ab, South Khorasan =

Riz Ab ريزاب
- Village
- Location within Iran
- Coordinates: 33°00′07″N 59°04′02″E
- Country: Iran
- Province: South Khorasan
- County: Birjand
- Bakhsh: Central
- Rural District: Baqeran

Population (2006)
  - Total: 111
- Time zone: UTC+3:30 (IRST)
  - Summer (DST): UTC+4:30 (IRDT)

Riz Ab (Persian: ريزاب, also Romanized as Rīz Āb; also known as Rehzow, Rīz Āb Bālā, and Rizau) is a village in Baqeran Rural District, in the Central District of Birjand County, South Khorasan Province, Iran. At the 2006 census, its population was 111, in 37 families.
