= Rizz (disambiguation) =

Rizz is an Internet slang word for charisma.

Rizz may also refer to:

- Rizz (EP), extended play recording by South Korean singer Soojin
- Ralph Tresvant, an American R&B singer-songwriter, nicknamed "rizz"
- Captain Rizz, a British reggae musician and community organiser
- The Rizzler, an American child influencer

== See also ==
- Riss (disambiguation)
