= Ris =

Ris may refer to the following:

- Ris, Puy-de-Dôme, a commune in France
- Ris, Hautes-Pyrénées, a commune in France
- Ris, Norway
- Diane Ris (1932–2013), Catholic nun, educator and author
- Friedrich Ris (1867–1931), Swiss physician and entomologist
- Hans Ris (1914-2004), American cytologist and electron microscopist
- Sweetbread, a type of offal, ris in French

== See also ==
- RIS (disambiguation)
- Riss (disambiguation)
