= Budget Aviation Holdings =

Budget Aviation Holdings Pte Ltd
- Type: Private
- Industry: Airline
- Headquarters: Singapore, Singapore
- Key people: Goh Choon Phong (Chairman); Lee Lik Hsin (CEO)
- Parent: Singapore Airlines
- Subsidiaries: Scoot (100%)

Budget Aviation Holdings is a Singapore-based holding company for a low-cost carrier operating in the Asia-Pacific region, consisting of Scoot.

The holding company was formed on 18 May 2016 to allow for easier management of the airline subsidiaries following the delisting of Tiger Airways from the Singapore stock exchange as the result of Tigerair's complete acquisition by Singapore Airlines.
