= List of defunct airlines of Singapore =

This is a list of defunct airlines of Singapore.

Airline	Image	IATA	ICAO	Callsign	Commenced operations	Ceased operations	Notes
Air Glona					2006	2008	
Airtrust Singapore					1975	1976	
Asia Pacific Air Cargo		CN	APK	APAC	1991	1993	
Jett8 Airlines		JX	JEC	TAIPAN	2007	2012	
Jetstar Asia		3K	JSA	JETSTAR ASIA	2004	2025	
Kris Air					1977	1981	
Malaysia–Singapore Airlines (MSA)		ML	MSA	MALAYSIAN	1966	1972	Split into Malaysian Airlines System and Singapore Airlines
Region Air		7S	RGA	Orchid	1988	2004	
Saber Air		SI			1969	1973	
Singapore Air Services					1968	1969	Rebranded as Saber Air
SilkAir		MI	SLK	SILKAIR	1992	2021	Merged into Singapore Airlines
Tiger Airways		TR	TGW	GO CAT	2004	2013	Rebranded as Tigerair
Tigerair		TR	TRW	GO CAT	2013	2017	Merged into Scoot
Tradewinds Airlines		MI	SQA		1975	1992	Rebranded as SilkAir
Valuair		VF	VLU	VALUAIR	2003	2014	Acquired by Jetstar Asia in 2005, brand retained by Jetstar Asia until 2014

== See also ==
- List of airlines of Singapore
- List of airports in Singapore
