= List of airlines of Singapore =

This is a list of airlines which have a current Air Operator Certificate issued by the Civil Aviation Authority of Singapore.

== Scheduled airlines ==
Airline	Image	IATA	ICAO	Callsign	Commenced operations
Scoot		TR	TGW	SCOOTER	2012
Singapore Airlines		SQ	SIA	SINGAPORE	1972

== Cargo airlines ==
Airline	Image	IATA	ICAO	Callsign	Commenced operations
Singapore Airlines Cargo		SQ	SQC	SINGAPORE	2001

== See also ==
- List of airlines
- List of defunct airlines of Singapore
- List of airports in Singapore
- List of defunct airlines of Asia
