= List of Jetstar Japan destinations =

This is a list of destinations that Jetstar Japan has operated to as of December 2025.

== Destinations ==
| Country | City | Airport | Notes | Ref |
|---|---|---|---|---|
| China | Shanghai | Shanghai Pudong International Airport | | |
| Hong Kong | Hong Kong | Hong Kong International Airport | Resumes 13 February 2026 | |
| Japan | Asahikawa | Asahikawa Airport | | |
| Japan | Fukuoka | Fukuoka Airport | | |
| Japan | Kagoshima | Kagoshima Airport | | |
| Japan | Kumamoto | Kumamoto Airport | | |
| Japan | Matsuyama | Matsuyama Airport | | |
| Japan | Miyazaki | Miyazaki Airport | | |
| Japan | Nagasaki | Nagasaki Airport | | |
| Japan | Nagoya | Chubu Centrair International Airport | Base | |
| Japan | Naha | Naha Airport | | |
| Japan | Kōchi | Kōchi Airport | | |
| Japan | Osaka | Kansai International Airport | Base | |
| Japan | Oita | Oita Airport | | |
| Japan | Sapporo | New Chitose Airport | | |
| Japan | Shimojishima | Shimojishima Airport | | |
| Japan | Shonai | Shonai Airport | | |
| Japan | Takamatsu | Takamatsu Airport | | |
| Japan | Tokyo | Narita International Airport | Base | |
| Philippines | Manila | Ninoy Aquino International Airport | | |
| Taiwan | Taipei | Taoyuan International Airport | | |
| Taiwan | Kaohsiung | Kaohsiung International Airport | | |
