= Value Alliance =

Low-cost airline alliance in Asia-Pacific (2016–2023)

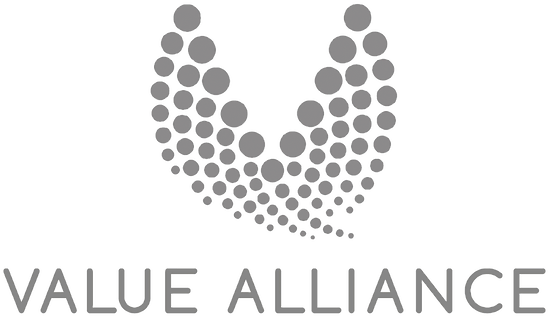
- Launch date: 16 May 2016
- Disbanded: 2023 (inactive)
- Full members: 5
- Destination airports: 187
- Destination countries: 30
- Annual passengers (M): 92
- Fleet size: 184
- Headquarters: Singapore
- Alliance slogan: Asia Pacific's Best Value Airlines
- Website: valuealliance.com

Value Alliance was an airline alliance formed in May 2016. The alliance was the second commercial airline alliance that comprised low-cost carriers, after the U-FLY Alliance. It was the first pan-regional LCC alliance and comprised five, originally eight, Asia-Pacific airlines: Cebu Pacific, Cebgo, Jeju Air, Nok Air and Scoot.

Value Alliance was the fourth-largest airline alliance in terms of passengers, flights, destinations, combined fleet and members, ahead of U-FLY Alliance and Vanilla Alliance.

According to the Wayback Machine, the Value Alliance website ceased operating or taking fares sometime after May 19, 2023, with a message saying "This website is no longer supported. If you have questions regarding your booking or flight, please connect with the airline of your booking."

== History ==
The Value Alliance was established by eight airlines in the Asia-Pacific region on 16 May 2016. The alliance allows passengers to book flights with all of the eight carriers through each partner website, to create itineraries across the region through a single booking. The combined carriers collectively serve more than 160 destinations, primarily in the Asia-Pacific region, with a total fleet of 176 aircraft and an annual passenger total of 47 million in 2015.

== Member airlines ==
=== Former members ===
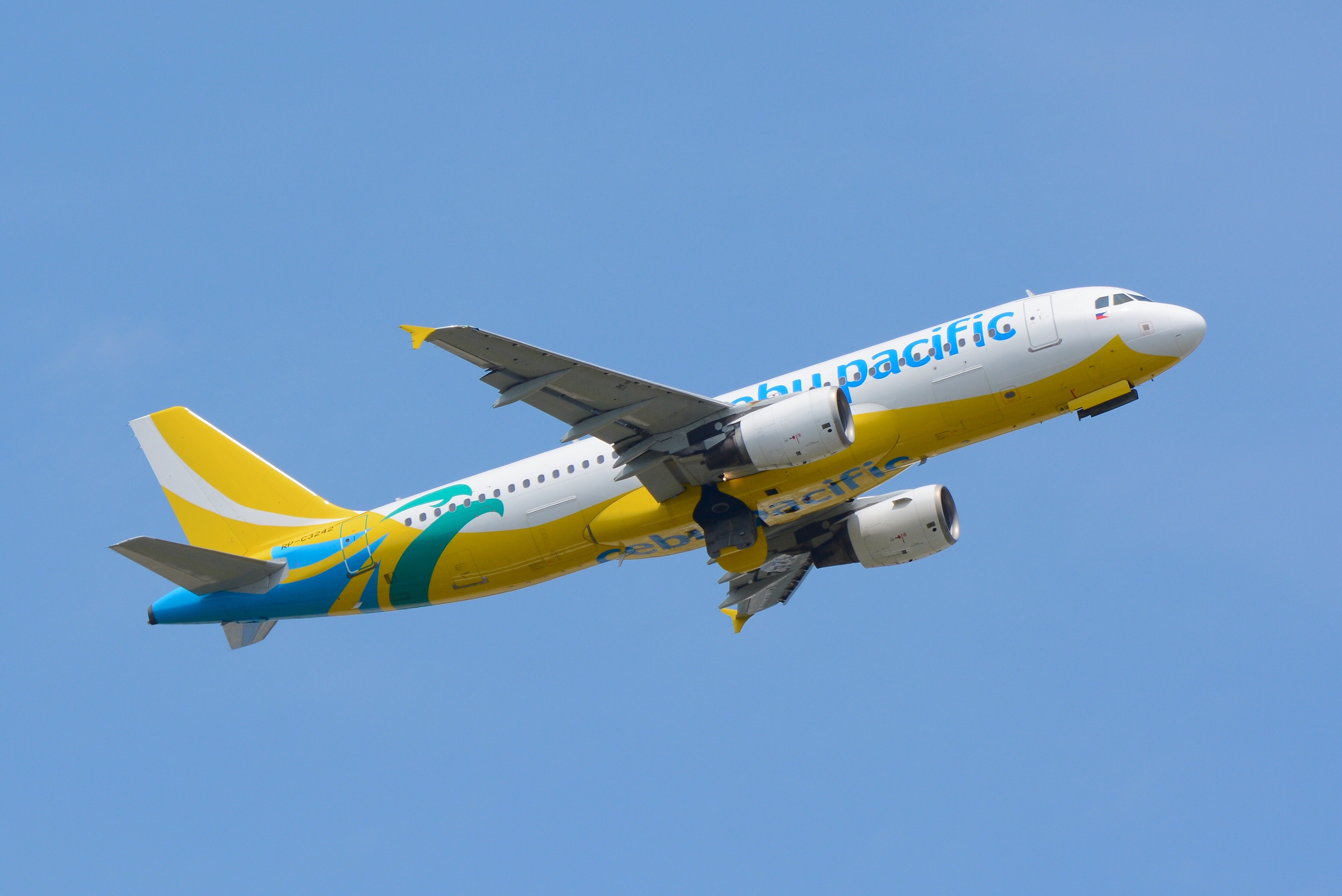
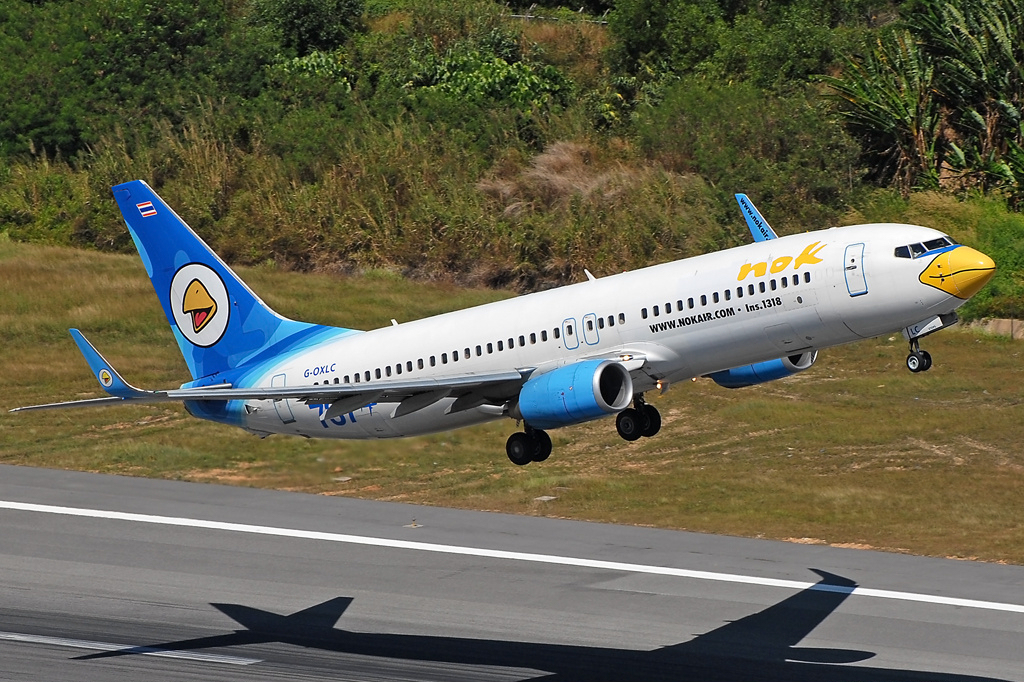
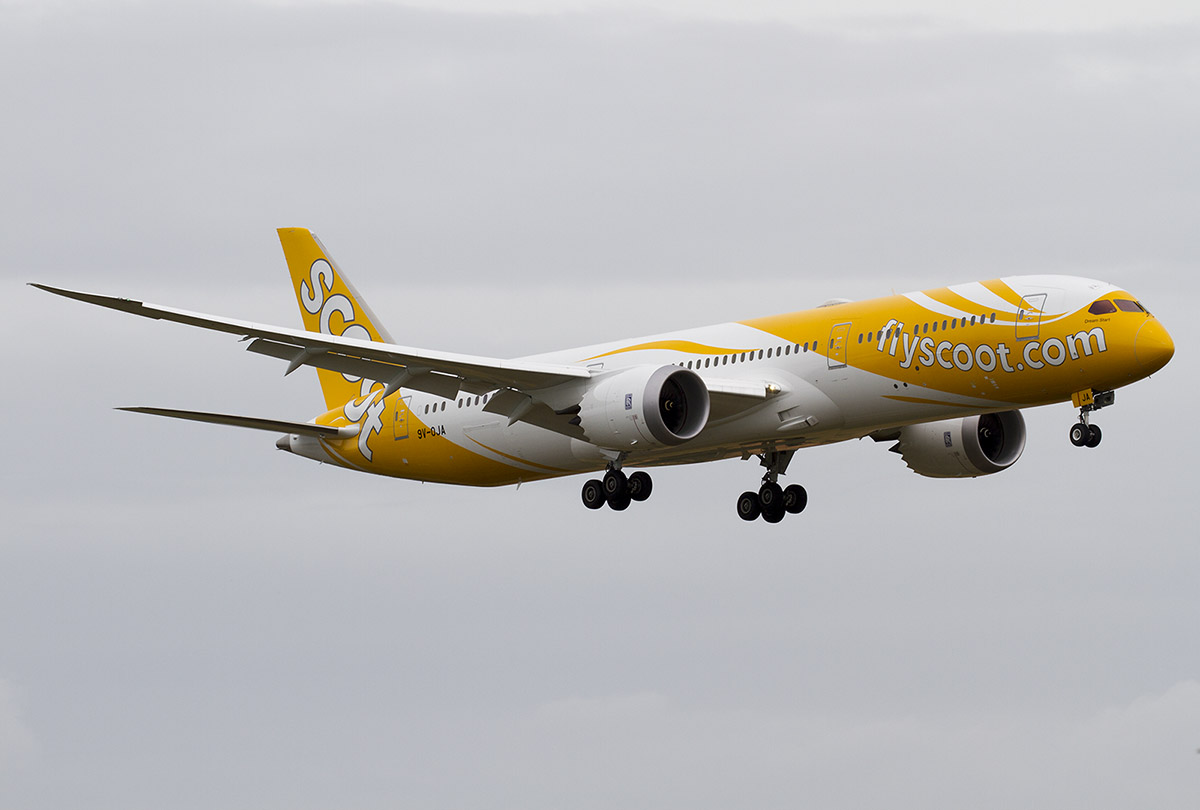
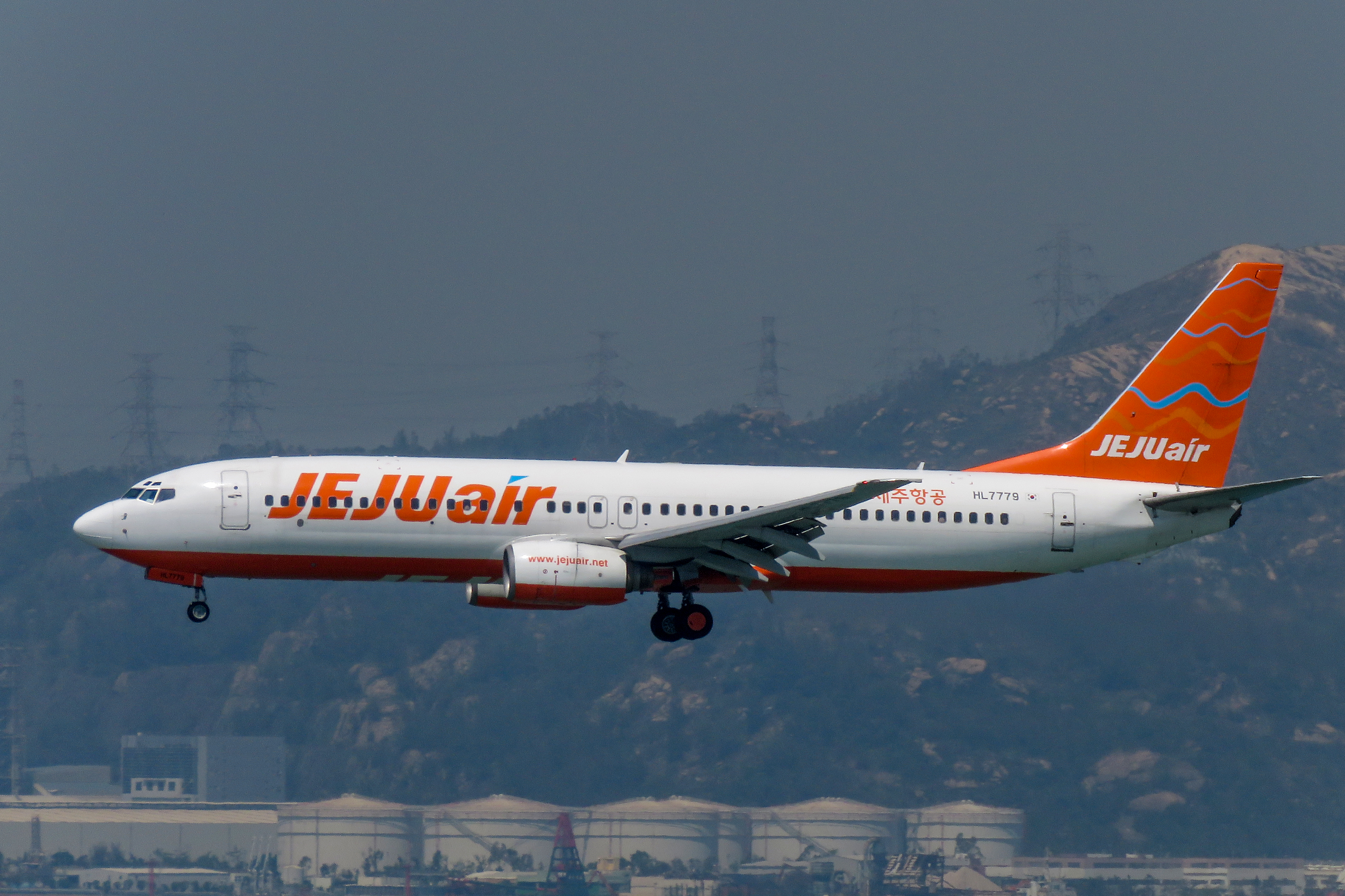
Cebu Pacific, Nok Air, Scoot and Jeju Air were the final four of the five current founding members of the Value Alliance.

The following airlines were members of Value Alliance:

Member airline	Joined	Exited	Notes
(Philippines) Cebu Pacific	16 May 2016	N/A	
(Philippines) Cebgo	16 May 2016	N/A	A subsidiary of Cebu Pacific.
(Singapore) Scoot	16 May 2016	N/A	
(South Korea) Jeju Air	16 May 2016	N/A	
(Thailand) Nok Air	16 May 2016	N/A	
Tigerair Australia	16 May 2016	2018	Operations suspended due to the COVID-19 pandemic.
(Japan) Vanilla Air	16 May 2016	30 March 2019	Merged into Peach Aviation on 26 October 2019.
(Singapore) Tigerair	16 May 2016	25 July 2017	Merged into Scoot on 25 July 2017.
(Thailand) NokScoot	16 May 2016	26 June 2020	Liquidated due to the COVID-19 pandemic.
