= AirAsia Japan =

Low-cost airline of Japan (2011–2013; 2014–2020)

AirAsia Japan Co., Ltd エアアジア・ジャパン株式会社 Eāajia Japan Kabushiki-gaisha
IATA	ICAO	Call sign
DJ	WAJ	WING ASIA
- Founded: Part 1: 1 July 2011; Part 2: 1 July 2014
- Commenced operations: Part 1: 1 August 2012; Part 2: 29 October 2017
- Ceased operations: Part 1: 26 October 2013 (re-branded as Vanilla Air); Part 2: 5 October 2020
- Operating bases: Nagoya–Centrair (2014–2020); Tokyo–Narita (2011–2013)
- Frequent-flyer program: BIG
- Parent company: AirAsia
- Headquarters: Nagoya, Aichi, Japan
- Key people: Tony Fernandes; Hiroshi Mikitani
- Operating income: JPY −3.3 billion (FY June 2013)
- Website: www.airasia.com

AirAsia Japan was the name of two incarnations of a Japanese low-cost airline, which had operated as a joint venture between the Malaysian AirAsia and Japanese partners.

AirAsia Japan's first incarnation was founded in July 2011, and was based at Tokyo's Narita International Airport until the airline ceased operations during October 2013, rebranding as Vanilla Air. AirAsia Japan's second incarnation was founded in July 2014, with its base of operations at Nagoya's Chubu Centrair International Airport. On 5 October 2020, the airline ceased operations due to low passenger demand caused by impacts of the COVID-19 pandemic.

== History ==
Tony Fernandes, the director and chief executive officer (CEO) of AirAsia, dubbed the two incarnations of AirAsia Japan as "Part 1" and "Part 2".

=== Part 1: All Nippon Airways joint venture (2012–2013) ===
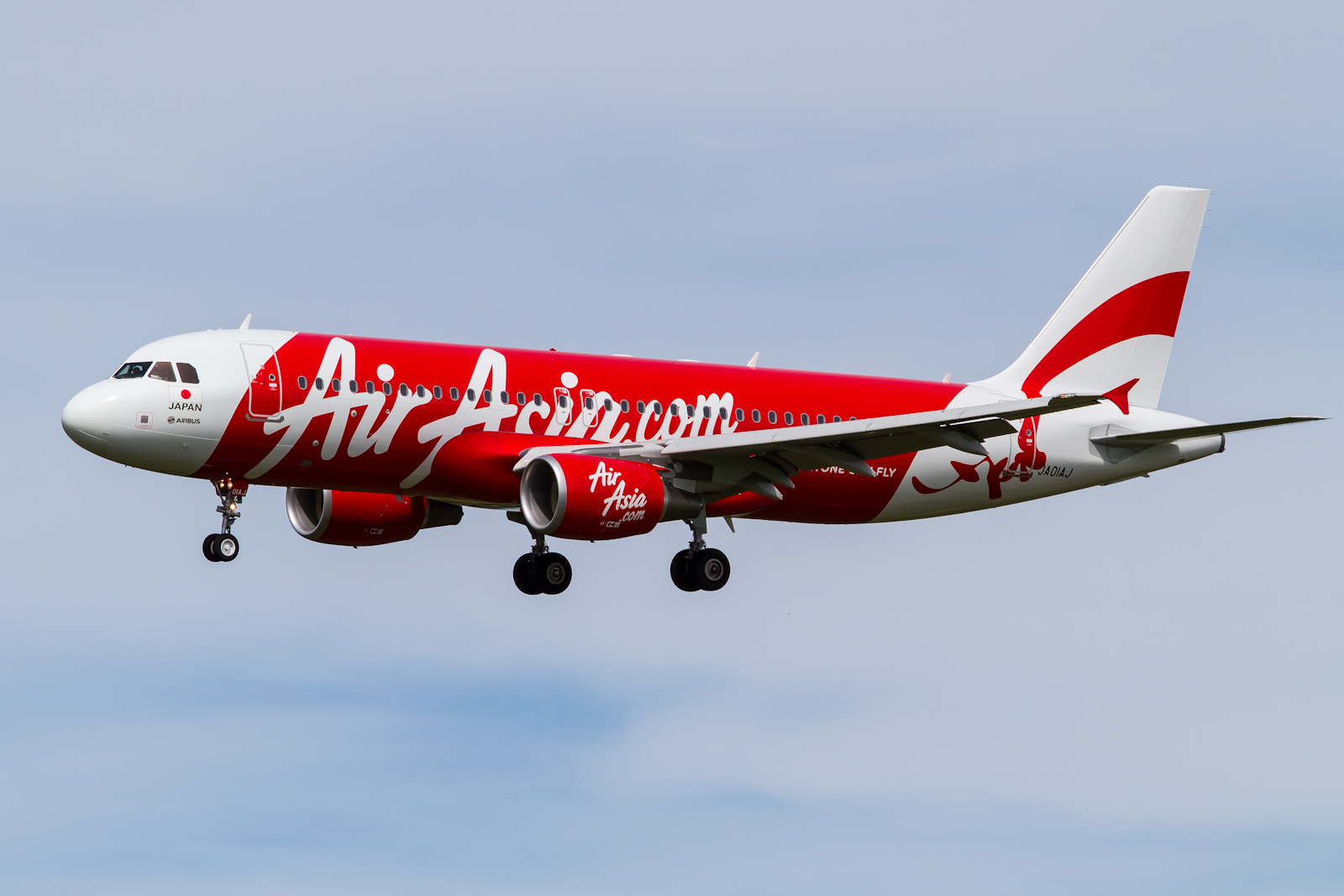
An AirAsia Japan Airbus A320-200 in 2012

Malaysian low-cost airline AirAsia and Japanese network airline All Nippon Airways (ANA) announced AirAsia Japan as its joint venture at a press conference in Tokyo on 21 July 2011. Its formation was announced only months after ANA had announced the formation of Peach, a low-cost airline based at Kansai International Airport in Osaka, and alongside a concurrent effort by Japan Airlines (JAL) to set up its own low-cost affiliate, which became Jetstar Japan. ANA elected to partner with an existing low-cost airline for efficiency and strategic advantage. Following its formal establishment in August 2011, AirAsia Japan's first flight occurred on 1 August 2012, from Tokyo Narita to Fukuoka Airport.

The airline was headquartered alongside ANA in Tokyo, with its main operating base at Narita International Airport. As the first low-cost airline to be based at Narita, it initially served domestic destinations utilising AirAsia's brand and service model. Future planned international destinations included the Philippines, South Korea and Taiwan. AirAsia's CEO Tony Fernandes also indicated that AirAsia Japan's hub at Narita may serve as a connecting point between Southeast Asia and the United States within the AirAsia group network.

==== Joint venture termination and rebranding (2013) ====
In June 2013, AirAsia decided to exit its investment in AirAsia Japan, making the company a wholly owned subsidiary of ANA. The Nikkei reported that AirAsia Japan had the lowest load factors between the three new entrant low-cost carriers in Japan (AirAsia Japan, Jetstar Japan, and Peach) and noted several reasons for the failure of the joint venture, including an online booking system that was not fully translated into Japanese (and was therefore frustrating to many domestic customers), failure to utilise travel agent distribution (a major component of domestic airline sales in Japan), the inconvenience of its main hub at Tokyo Narita, and the airport's severe restrictions on early morning and late night flights.

AirAsia Japan announced in August 2013 that it would continue operation under its current branding through 26 October 2013, before the airline's rebranding as Vanilla Air effective 1 November 2013. AirAsia Japan's aircraft would be transferred to Indonesia AirAsia, while Vanilla Air would start operations with two of its own aircraft. Vanilla Air's plans additionally included expansion to ten aircraft by fiscal year 2015, and to serve both domestic and international routes alongside a new, second hub at Nagoya's Chubu Centrair International Airport. All of AirAsia Japan's staff were to be inherited by Vanilla Air, and the airline would focus on serving resort destinations, eventually expanding to longer routes after an initial focus on short-haul routes.

AirAsia announced that it would start a new joint venture operation in Japan at a later date with a different partner, but the Nikkei reported that this seemed unlikely given foreign ownership restrictions, and the fact that the only seasoned Japanese airline operators outside of the ANA group consisted of JAL, which had already invested in the Jetstar Japan joint venture, and Skymark Airlines, the involvement of which was unlikely.

=== Part 2: Re-entering the Japanese market (2014–2020) ===
On 1 July 2014, it was announced that AirAsia had partnered with the online mall and travel agency Rakuten (to hold 18% of the stake), a Japanese cosmetics, energy drinks and aircraft leasing firm Noevir Holdings (9%), the sportswear firm Alpen (5%), and private equity firm Octave Japan (19%), to relaunch AirAsia Japan. AirAsia was to hold the remaining 49% stake. Its initial capital consisted of JPY7 billion (US$69 million), with Yoshinori Odagiri, CEO from the previous incarnation of AirAsia Japan, returning as chairman. The airline was expected to commence operations in summer 2015, with two Airbus A320 aircraft and its new hub at Nagoya's Chubu Centrair International Airport. Plans also included the fleet expansion from two Airbus A320 aircraft to four by the end of 2015. On 6 October 2015, it was announced that AirAsia Japan received its air operating license to start operating flights, while also announcing Sendai, Sapporo, and Taipei, Taiwan as the airline's first three destinations from Nagoya Centrair.

After several delays, AirAsia Japan relaunched on 29 October 2017, with its first flight from Nagoya Centrair to Sapporo. By August 2019, the airline had officially launched services from Nagoya Centrair to Sendai and Taipei. In January 2020, the airline announced a new service between Nagoya Centrair and Fukuoka to begin the following month, however due to the airline's temporary suspension of operations starting in March 2020 during the COVID-19 pandemic, the new service did not begin until some of its regular domestic operations resumed on 1 August 2020.

==== End of operation (2020) ====
Following AirAsia Japan's resumption of service in August 2020, the airline by mid-September 2020 had again suspended its flights amidst low passenger numbers, with AirAsia Group CEO Tony Fernandes further adding that the viability of AirAsia Japan's business would be reviewed. The airline's closure was approved on 30 September 2020, with the formal announcement made on 5 October 2020. Before the shutdown, AirAsia Japan's employees were invited to apply for voluntary retirement, but these and other steps failed to solve the carrier's financial problems. On 17 November 2020, AirAsia Japan filed for bankruptcy proceedings in the Tokyo District Court, and was the first Japanese airline to cease operation following the start of the COVID-19 pandemic.

== Destinations ==
The first incarnation of AirAsia Japan launched in August 2012, with its operations based at Tokyo's Narita International Airport prior to the airline's closing and subsequent rebranding as Vanilla Air after October 2013. A new company relaunched under the AirAsia Japan name in October 2017 and operated until October 2020, with its operations based at Nagoya's Chubu Centrair International Airport.

The following table includes destinations that were served between both of the airline's incarnations by October 2020:

Country	City	Airport	Notes	Refs
Japan	Fukuoka	Fukuoka Airport		
Japan	Nagoya	Chubu Centrair International Airport	Base	
Japan	Naha	Naha Airport	Terminated	
Japan	Osaka	Kansai International Airport	Terminated	
Japan	Sapporo	New Chitose Airport		
Japan	Sendai	Sendai Airport		
Japan	Tokyo	Narita International Airport	Base; Terminated	
South Korea	Busan	Gimhae International Airport	Terminated	
South Korea	Seoul	Incheon International Airport	Terminated	
Taiwan	Taipei	Taoyuan International Airport		

== Fleet ==
AirAsia Japan operated the following aircraft by the time of its shutdown in October 2020:

AirAsia Japan fleet
Aircraft	Total	Orders	Passengers	Notes
Airbus A320-200	3	—	180	
Airbus A320-200	3	—	186	
Airbus A320neo	—	1	186	Order transferred to AirAsia.
Total	3	1		

=== Previously operated ===
AirAsia Japan as its previous joint venture with All Nippon Airways operated a further three Airbus A320-200 aircraft, which were returned to AirAsia affiliate Indonesia AirAsia after the joint venture was subsequently rebranded as Vanilla Air.

== Frequent-flyer program ==
AirAsia Japan participated in BIG, the frequent-flyer program of AirAsia and its affiliated airlines.

== See also ==
- AirAsia
- AirAsia X
- Philippines AirAsia
- Thai AirAsia
