= Vanilla Air =

Low-cost airline of Japan (2013–2019)

Vanilla Air Inc. バニラ・エア株式会社 Banira Ea Kabushiki-gaisha
IATA	ICAO	Call sign
JW	VNL	VANILLA
- Founded: 1 November 2013
- Commenced operations: 20 December 2013
- Ceased operations: 26 October 2019 (merged into Peach Aviation)
- Operating bases: Narita International Airport
- Alliance: Value Alliance (2016–2019)
- Parent company: All Nippon Airways
- Headquarters: Narita International Airport, Narita, Chiba Prefecture, Japan
- Key people: Katsuya Goto (President)
- Employees: Total 759 employees (as of 1 August 2018)
- Website: www.vanilla-air.com/en

Vanilla Air was a low-cost airline in Japan wholly owned by All Nippon Airways. Its head office was within Terminal 2 of Narita International Airport in Narita, Chiba Prefecture. The airline ceased operations in October 2019 on its merger with Peach Aviation.

== History ==
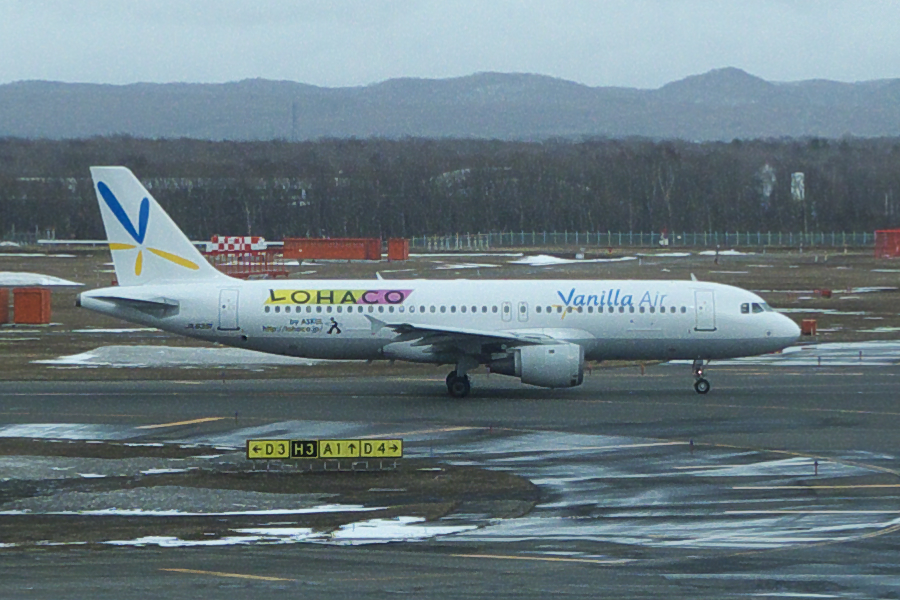
A Vanilla Air Airbus A320at New Chitose Airport in 2014

In June 2013, AirAsia announced it would exit its investment in AirAsia Japan, making the company a wholly owned subsidiary of ANA. AirAsia Japan announced in August that it would continue operation under its current branding through 26 October 2013 and would then be rebranded as Vanilla Air effective 1 November 2013; Vanilla Air would start operations with two aircraft and expand to ten aircraft by fiscal year 2015, with both domestic and international routes. All of AirAsia Japan's staff were to be inherited by Vanilla Air, and the airline would focus on serving resort destinations, eventually expanding to longer routes after an initial focus on short-haul routes.

AirAsia Japan aircraft was transferred to Indonesia AirAsia, with Vanilla Air retaining only two aircraft at the outset. Although Vanilla Air was to continue operating from AirAsia Japan's principal base at Narita International Airport, the fleet reduction forced the abandonment of the AirAsia Japan base at Chubu Centrair International Airport. However, Vanilla Air management stated that Chubu was the strongest candidate for a second hub.

At the end of July, prior to the rebranding announcement, the Nikkei reported that the restructured AirAsia Japan operation would focus on the popular resort markets of Sapporo, Okinawa, Honolulu, Guam and Saipan; a later report stated that 70% of its capacity would be international, making better use of slot restrictions at Narita Airport by operating outbound flights late at night and return flights early in the morning. The expansion to 10 aircraft was intended to make the airline more competitive with Jetstar Japan, a Narita-based low-cost carrier partly owned by Japan Airlines.

Vanilla Air operated its first flights from Narita to Okinawa and Taipei on 20 December 2013. Vanilla Air introduced the "Vaniller's Pass," a one-month pass good for travel on its Tokyo-Amami route, in December 2014. Although aimed at surfing and diving enthusiasts in the Tokyo region, passengers used the passes for other purposes such as caring for family members.

In its first years of operations, Vanilla Air faced a pilot shortage and operated at a net loss. In the fiscal year ending March 2016, amid low oil prices and a surge of inbound tourism to Japan, Vanilla Air produced its first annual operating profit, allowing it to unfreeze its expansion plans. In February 2016, it was reported that Vanilla Air would set up a second base at Taipei Taoyuan International Airport to serve destinations in Southeast Asia, making Vanilla Air the first Japanese LCC to utilize beyond rights from a third country.

In June 2017, Vanilla Air suffered criticism after a disabled passenger flying from Amami to Osaka had to crawl up a set of stairs to enter an aircraft. The passenger, Hideto Kojima, was told he would not be allowed to board the plane if he could not climb the stairs without assistance.

On 22 March 2018, All Nippon Airways announced the integration of its two low cost carrier subsidiaries, Peach Aviation and Vanilla Air Integration began during the second half of the 2018 fiscal year and was completed by the end of 2019. Vanilla would be merged into Peach, planning for a fleet of more than 50 aircraft beyond FY2020 (up from 35 originally), operating on more than 50 routes (up from 39) and targeting a ¥150 ($1.37) billion revenue and a 10% operating profit for FY2020. Vanilla Air ceased operations on 26 October 2019.

== Corporate affairs ==
When it was known as AirAsia Japan, the airline had its headquarters in Shiodome City Center in Minato, Tokyo.

The headquarters was in Tokyo Narita Terminal 2.

== Destinations ==
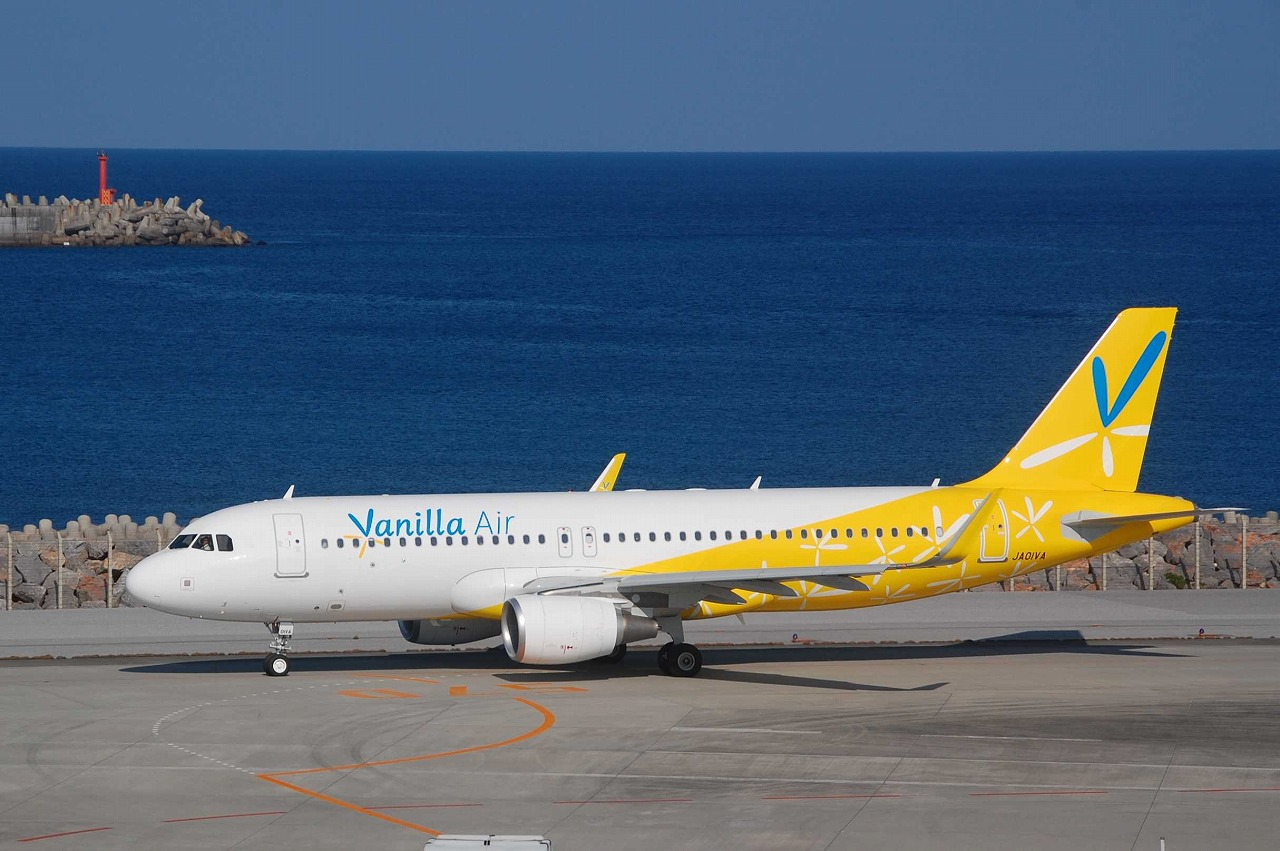
A Vanilla Air Airbus A320 (2014)

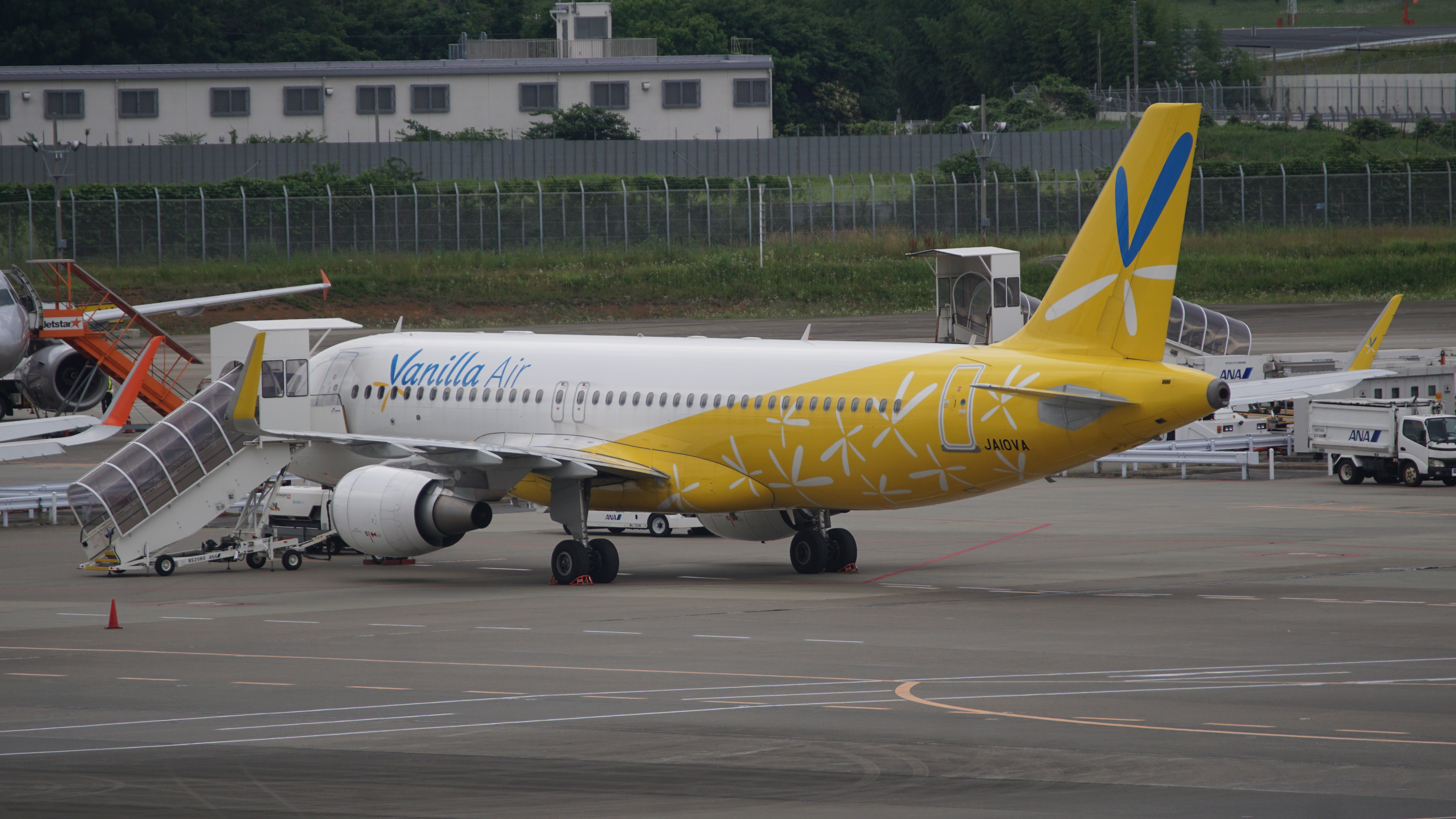
A Vanilla Air Airbus A320 at Narita 2017

Vanilla Air served the following destinations (as of October 2019, at time of merger into Peach Aviation):

Country	City	Airport	Refs
Hong Kong	Hong Kong	Hong Kong International Airport	
Japan	Amami	Amami Airport	
Japan	Fukuoka	Fukuoka Airport	
Japan	Hakodate	Hakodate Airport	
Japan	Ishigaki	New Ishigaki Airport	
Japan	Naha	Naha Airport	
Japan	Osaka	Kansai International Airport	
Japan	Sapporo	New Chitose Airport	
Japan	Tokyo	Narita International Airport	
South Korea	Seoul	Incheon International Airport	
Philippines	Cebu	Mactan–Cebu International Airport	
Taiwan	Kaohsiung	Kaohsiung International Airport	
Taiwan	Taipei	Taoyuan International Airport	
Vietnam	Ho Chi Minh City	Tan Son Nhat International Airport	

== Fleet ==
As of October 2019 (at time of merger into Peach Aviation), Vanilla Air operated the following aircraft:

Aircraft	In fleet	Passengers
Airbus A320-200	6	180

Vanilla Air took delivery of its first A320 aircraft on 14 November 2013.

== Livery ==
The Vanilla Air livery featured a white fuselage and a yellow stabilizer, with a blue ‘V’ and three white lines below the ‘V’, therefore making a shape of a flower painted on it. The words 'Vanilla Air' were painted on top of the windows.
