= NokScoot =

Low-cost airline of Thailand (2014–2020)

IATA	ICAO	Call sign
XW	NCT	BIG BIRD
- Founded: 16 December 2013
- Commenced operations: 25 July 2014
- Ceased operations: 26 June 2020
- Operating bases: Don Mueang International Airport
- Alliance: Value Alliance (2016–2020)
- Parent company: Nok Air (51%); Scoot (49%)
- Headquarters: Bangkok, Thailand
- Key people: Yodchai Sudhidhanakul (CEO)
- Revenue: ▲ ฿7,207.46 billion (FY 2019/20)
- Net income: ▲ ฿−1,352.18 million (FY 2019/20)
- Employees: 450

NokScoot Airlines Company Limited (commonly referred to as NokScoot) was a Thailand-based low-cost airline, operating medium- to long-haul international services out of Bangkok's Don Mueang International Airport. On 26 June 2020, the airline ceased its operation and was liquidated as a result of the COVID-19 pandemic.

== History ==
On 16 December 2013, Scoot announced the signing of a memorandum of understanding with Nok Air to establish a new carrier in Bangkok, operating on medium- and long-haul routes with a fleet of Boeing 777-200ER aircraft. NokScoot was a joint venture of Thailand's Nok Air and Singapore based Scoot. The airline operated commercial flights out of Don Mueang International Airport after 20 May 2015. Nok Air owned 51% of NokScoot, with Scoot, a subsidiary of Singapore Airlines, owning the remaining 49% – the Thai statutory limit for foreign ownership. The airline had an initial capital of 2 billion baht.

NokScoot went out of business on 26 June 2020 as it could not recover from the effects of the COVID-19 pandemic impact. NokScoot returned three aircraft from the five-jet fleet to the parent company in Singapore by June 2020. The airline company is going to be liquidated after Singapore Airline's low-cost arm Scoot offered to sell its 49 percent shares to Nok Airlines Plc. for a nominal sum of 1 baht, but the offer was not accepted. NokScoot had been unable to record a full year's profit since its inception in 2014. The decision of liquidation left 450 employees out of work.

== Destinations ==
As of June 2020, NokScoot flew (or have planned to fly) to the following destinations (at closure):

Country	City	Airport	Notes	Refs
China	Dalian	Dalian Zhoushuizi International Airport	Terminated	
China	Nanjing	Nanjing Lukou International Airport		
China	Qingdao	Qingdao Liuting International Airport		
China	Shanghai	Shanghai Pudong International Airport		
China	Shenyang	Shenyang Taoxian International Airport		
China	Tianjin	Tianjin Binhai International Airport		
China	Xi'an	Xi'an Xianyang International Airport		
India	Delhi	Indira Gandhi International Airport		
Japan	Osaka	Kansai International Airport		
Japan	Sapporo	New Chitose Airport		
Japan	Tokyo	Narita International Airport		
Singapore	Singapore	Changi Airport	Terminated	
Taiwan	Taipei	Taoyuan International Airport		
Thailand	Bangkok	Don Mueang International Airport	Base	

== Fleet ==
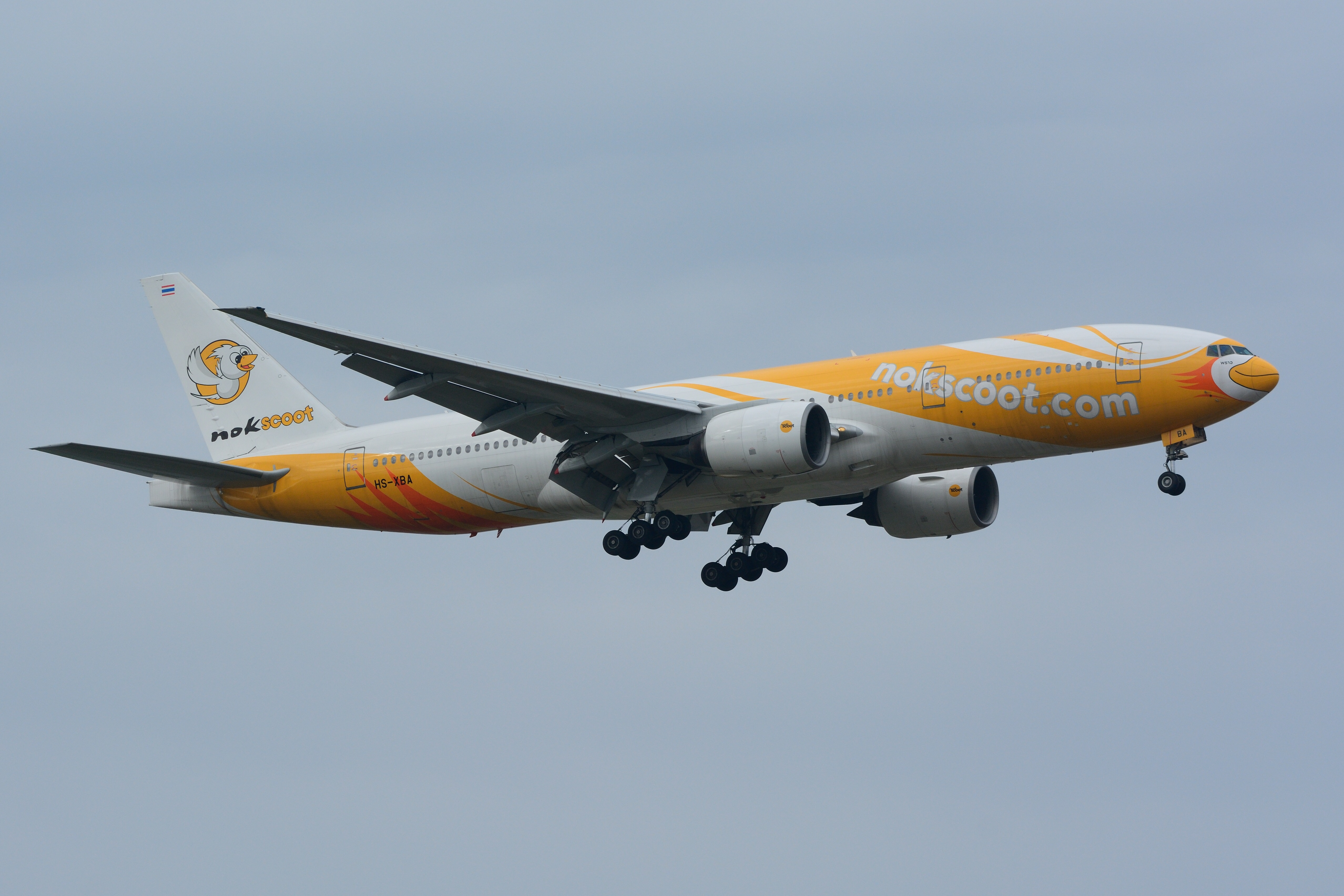
A NokScoot Boeing 777-200ER landing at Narita International Airport

NokScoot solely operated the Boeing 777-200ER, which were all obtained from Scoot's parent, Singapore Airlines. The first aircraft joined the fleet in November 2014. The airline's livery was a hybrid between its parent airlines Scoot and Nok Air. At the time of liquidation, NokScoot operated the following aircraft:

NokScoot fleet
Aircraft	In service	Orders	Passengers			Notes
Aircraft	In service	Orders	J	Y	Total	Notes
Boeing 777-200ER	7	—	24	391	415	All returned to Singapore Airlines. Five aircraft later acquired by Mahan Air.
Total	7	—				

== Cabin ==
NokScoot's aircraft were operated in a two-class configuration, Scoot Plus and Economy.

=== Scoot Plus ===
There are 24 Scoot Plus seats in the airline's Boeing 777s. These seats are not lie-flat; the backs recline 8 inches (20 cm) and have a pitch of 38 inches (97 cm). Each seat is 21.7 inches (55 cm) wide and has a footrest and in-arm trays that can be unfolded partially or fully. Similar to its parent airline Scoot, all Scoot Plus seats have in-seat power, while the airfare includes complimentary meals and a checked luggage allowance of 30 kilograms (66 lb).

=== Economy ===
There are 391 Economy seats, arranged to provide three different levels of comfort. Standard Economy seats have a pitch of 31 inches (79 cm); Super seats have a pitch of 35 inches (89 cm); and S-t-r-e-t-c-h seats, located at the front of each section of the economy cabin, have a pitch of 36 inches (91 cm). As these are bulkhead and exit row seats, there are no seats in front of them to recline back to invade their space, giving them the most legroom in the Economy cabin. Passengers in Standard Economy may reserve seats for a fee, while the fares for Super seats are higher than for Standard Economy seats; passengers choosing S-t-r-e-t-c-h seats will have to pay more compared to the Super Seats. Passengers have to pay for meals in economy, either pre-paid or buy-on board. Passengers must also pay for any checked luggage.
