= Peach Aviation =

Japanese low-cost airline

Peach Aviation Limited ピーチ・アビエーション 株式会社 Pīchi Abiēshon Kabushiki-gaisha

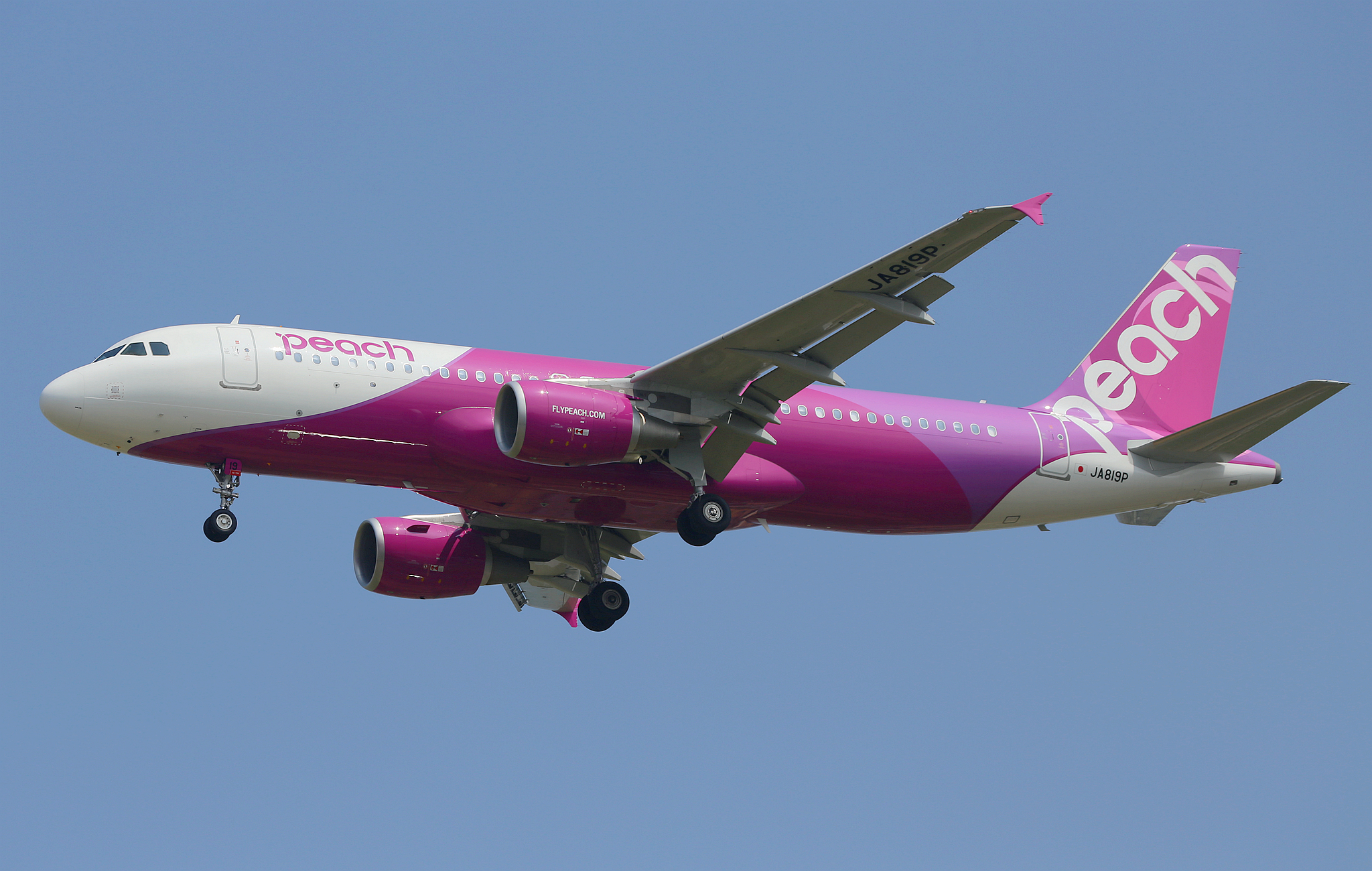
- A Peach Airbus A320
IATA	ICAO	Call sign
MM	APJ	AIR PEACH
- Founded: 10 February 2011; 15 years ago (as A&F Aviation)
- Commenced operations: 1 March 2012; 14 years ago
- Operating bases: Naha; Osaka–Kansai; Sendai; Tokyo–Narita
- Frequent-flyer program: Peach Points
- Fleet size: 40
- Destinations: 37
- Parent company: All Nippon Airways
- Headquarters: Izumisano, Osaka Prefecture, Japan
- Key people: Kazunari Ohashi (Representative Director, President & CEO)
- Revenue: JPY 14.3 billion (FY June 2013)
- Operating income: JPY 1,046 million (June 2013)
- Employees: 1,877 (1 February 2024)
- Website: www.flypeach.com

Peach Aviation is a Japanese low-cost airline. Its head office is at Kansai International Airport and in Izumisano, Osaka Prefecture. Peach mainly serves domestic Japanese routes, with select destinations in neighbouring countries such as South Korea, China, Taiwan, Singapore, and Thailand.

== History ==
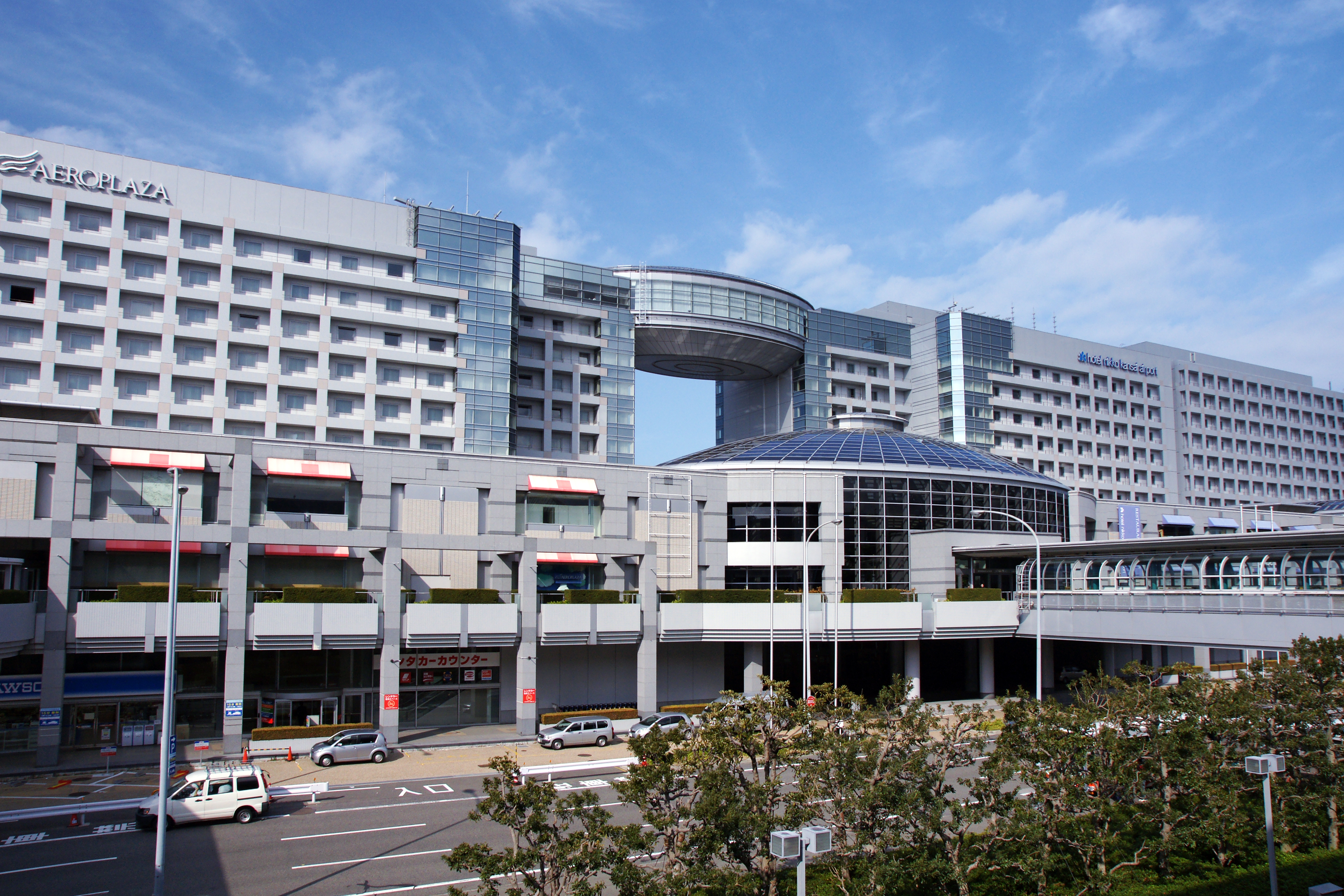
Aeroplaza (エアロプラザ, Earopuraza), former headquarters of Peach

The company was formed on 10 February 2011 as A&F Aviation, a joint venture between All Nippon Airways (ANA) and the First Eastern Investment Group, a Hong Kong-based private equity and venture capital firm. The company applied for an operating certificate in April 2011 and changed its name to Peach Aviation in May 2011. Its shares were held in almost equal portions by ANA, FEIG, and the Innovation Network Corporation of Japan (INCJ), ANA holding a slightly larger share of the three. ANA controls 77.9% of Peach's stock as of 2018.

Peach's brand development was conducted by CIA, Inc. and The Brand Architect Group, who engaged Neil Denari for aircraft livery design and James Wilkie for uniform design. The airline is based at Kansai International Airport. In July 2011, Peach received 1,909 applications for its first class of ninety flight attendants.

At one time, its headquarters were located on the third floor of Aeroplaza (エアロプラザ, Earopuraza), located on the property of Kansai International Airport in Tajiri, Sennan District, Osaka Prefecture. On 1 August 2011, Peach announced that it was moving its operations office from Aeroplaza to Kensetsu-to. At some point, the headquarters returned to Aeroplaza.

Peach's first aircraft, an Airbus A320, was delivered to its home base at Kansai International Airport in November 2011. Within its fleet, Peach has two named aircraft. Its first A320 was named Peach Dream; its tenth A320 was named Wing of Tohoku following a contest in which sixty elementary school students from the Tohoku region submitted proposals. The airline's first flight was on 1 March 2012, between Osaka Kansai and New Chitose Airport, which serves the Sapporo metropolitan area.

Peach was the most successful of the three new Japanese low-cost carriers during their first year of operations, with average load factors around 80 percent versus 70 percent for Jetstar Japan and 50 to 60 percent for AirAsia Japan. Peach's 24-hour operations and exclusive terminal at Kansai Airport were credited for its relative success, as well as its stronger focus on certain passenger experience factors such as its reservations and check-in systems.

However, during the summer 2014 season Peach cancelled over 2,000 planned flights (about 16% of its total capacity) due to a shortage of pilots. The airline planned to have 62 pilots by October 2014 but only had 52 as of April, eight of whom were unable to fly due to sickness or injury. Loss of pilots to other airlines was a contributing cause for the shortage. It was later reported that Peach would consider allowing its pilots to commute from Tokyo Haneda to Osaka Kansai on other airlines, a practice rarely allowed in Japan, in order to attract candidates who were unwilling to relocate to Osaka.

In May 2017, Peach became the first airline in Japan to accept bitcoin as payment.

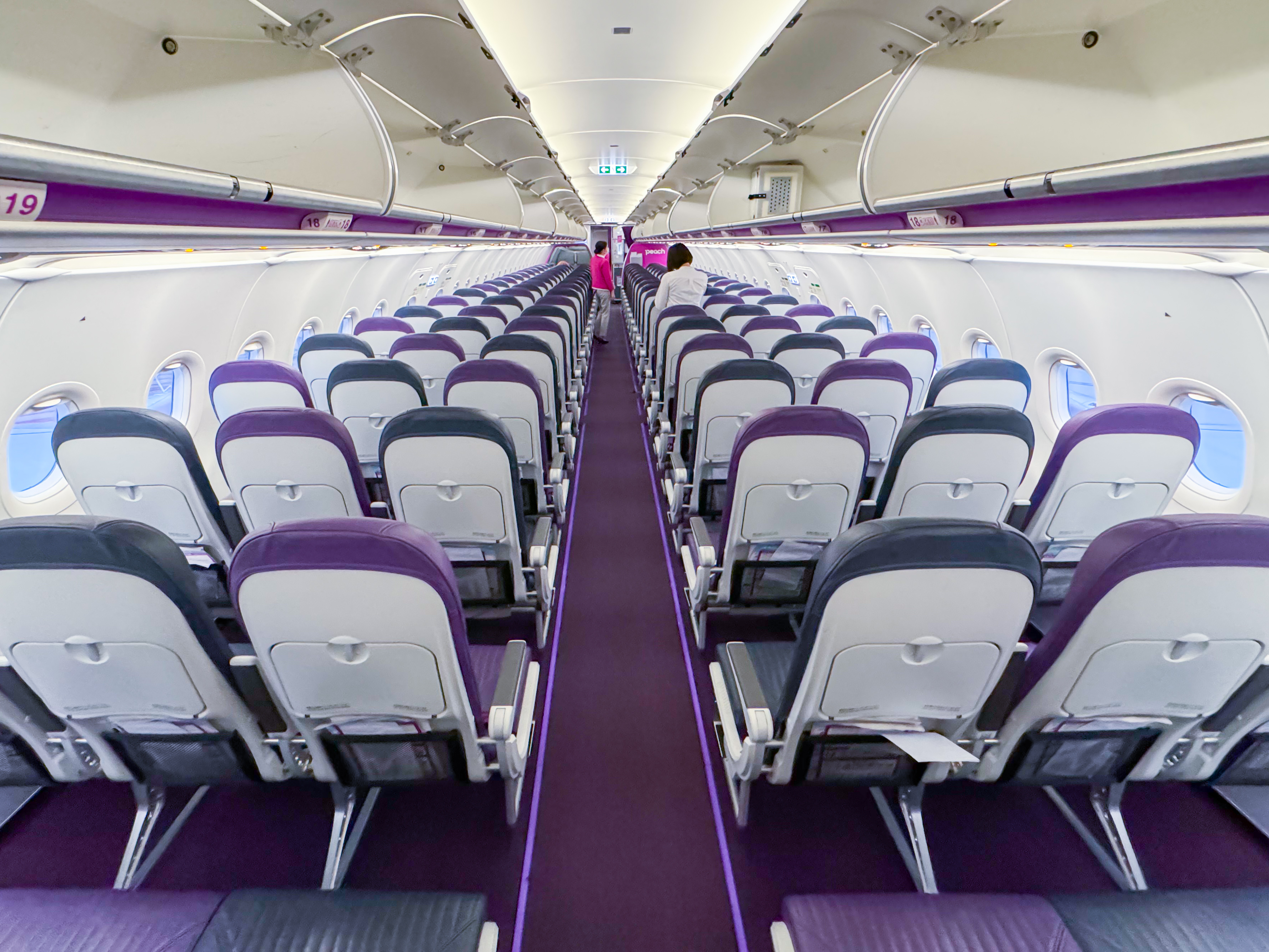
Inside the cabin of a Peach Airbus A320neo (2023)

On 22 March 2018, All Nippon Airways announced the integration of its two low-cost carrier subsidiaries, Peach and Vanilla Air, with Peach as the surviving brand. Integration began during the second half of the 2018 fiscal year and was completed by the end of 2019. The combined airline also planned to operate over 50 aircraft and routes beyond FY2020, up from 35 aircraft and 39 routes at the time of the announcement, as well as targeted a ¥150 (0.95) billion revenue and a 10% operating profit for FY2020. Vanilla Air ceased operations on 26 October 2019, with its operations integrated with Peach's.

On 23 December 2024, it was reported that ANA has acquired the remaining 7% stake from First Eastern Aviation Holdings and therefore assume full ownership of Peach.

== Corporate affairs ==
The key trends for Peach Aviation are (as of the financial year ending 31 March): (Note: until FY2019 including Vanilla Air)

	Revenue (Note: "Passenger revenues") (¥b)	Number of passengers (m)	Load factor (%)	Fleet size	References
2017	87.5	7.7	86.3		
2018	93.6	8.1	86.2		
2019	81.9	7.2	83.1	34	
2020	22.0	2.0	48.7	33	
2021	37.8	4.2	61.6	35	
2022	90.2	7.7	73.5	33	
2023	138.0	9.3	86.7	36	
2024	139.3	9.1	84.4	40	

== Destinations ==
As of October 2025, Peach flies (or has flown) to the following destinations:

Country	City	Airport	Notes	Refs
China	Shanghai	Shanghai Pudong International Airport		
Hong Kong	Hong Kong	Hong Kong International Airport		
Japan	Amami	Amami Airport		
Japan	Fukuoka	Fukuoka Airport		
Japan	Ishigaki	New Ishigaki Airport		
Japan	Kagoshima	Kagoshima Airport		
Japan	Matsuyama	Matsuyama Airport	Terminated	
Japan	Miyazaki	Miyazaki Airport		
Japan	Nagasaki	Nagasaki Airport		
Japan	Nagoya	Chubu Centrair International Airport		
Japan	Naha	Naha Airport	Base	
Japan	Niigata	Niigata Airport		
Japan	Oita	Oita Airport		
Japan	Osaka	Kansai International Airport	Base	
Japan	Sapporo	New Chitose Airport		
Japan	Sendai	Sendai Airport	Base	
Japan	Tokyo	Haneda Airport		
Japan	Tokyo	Narita International Airport	Base	
Singapore	Singapore	Changi Airport		
South Korea	Busan	Gimhae International Airport	Terminated	
South Korea	Seoul	Gimpo International Airport		
South Korea	Seoul	Incheon International Airport		
Taiwan	Kaohsiung	Kaohsiung International Airport		
Taiwan	Taipei	Taoyuan International Airport		
Thailand	Bangkok	Suvarnabhumi Airport		

=== Codeshare agreements ===
Peach has a codeshare agreement with All Nippon Airways.

== Fleet ==
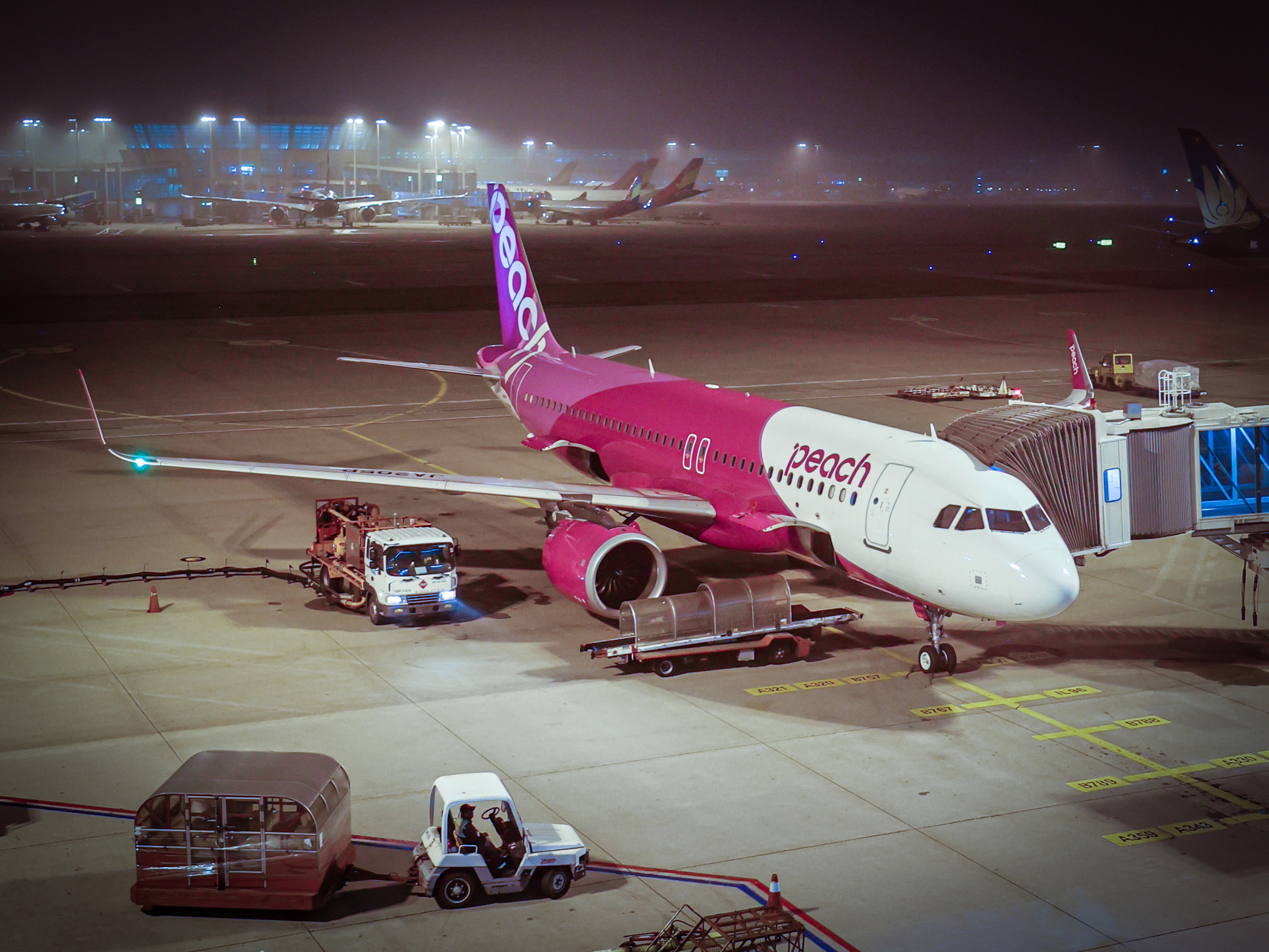
A Peach Airbus A320neo at Incheon International Airport, Seoul, South Korea (2023)

=== Current fleet ===
As of July 2026, Peach Aviation operates the following aircraft:

Peach Aviation fleet
Aircraft	In service	Orders	Passengers	Notes
Airbus A320-200	13	—	180	Older aircraft to be retired and replaced by Airbus A320neo.
Airbus A320neo	24	—	188	To replace older Airbus A320-200.
Airbus A321neo	—	10	TBA	
Airbus A321LR	3	—	218	
Airbus A321XLR	—	3	TBA	
Total	40	13		

=== Former fleet ===
As of August 2025, Peach operated 14 Airbus A320, 18 Airbus A320neo and 3 Airbus A321neo.

== Livery ==
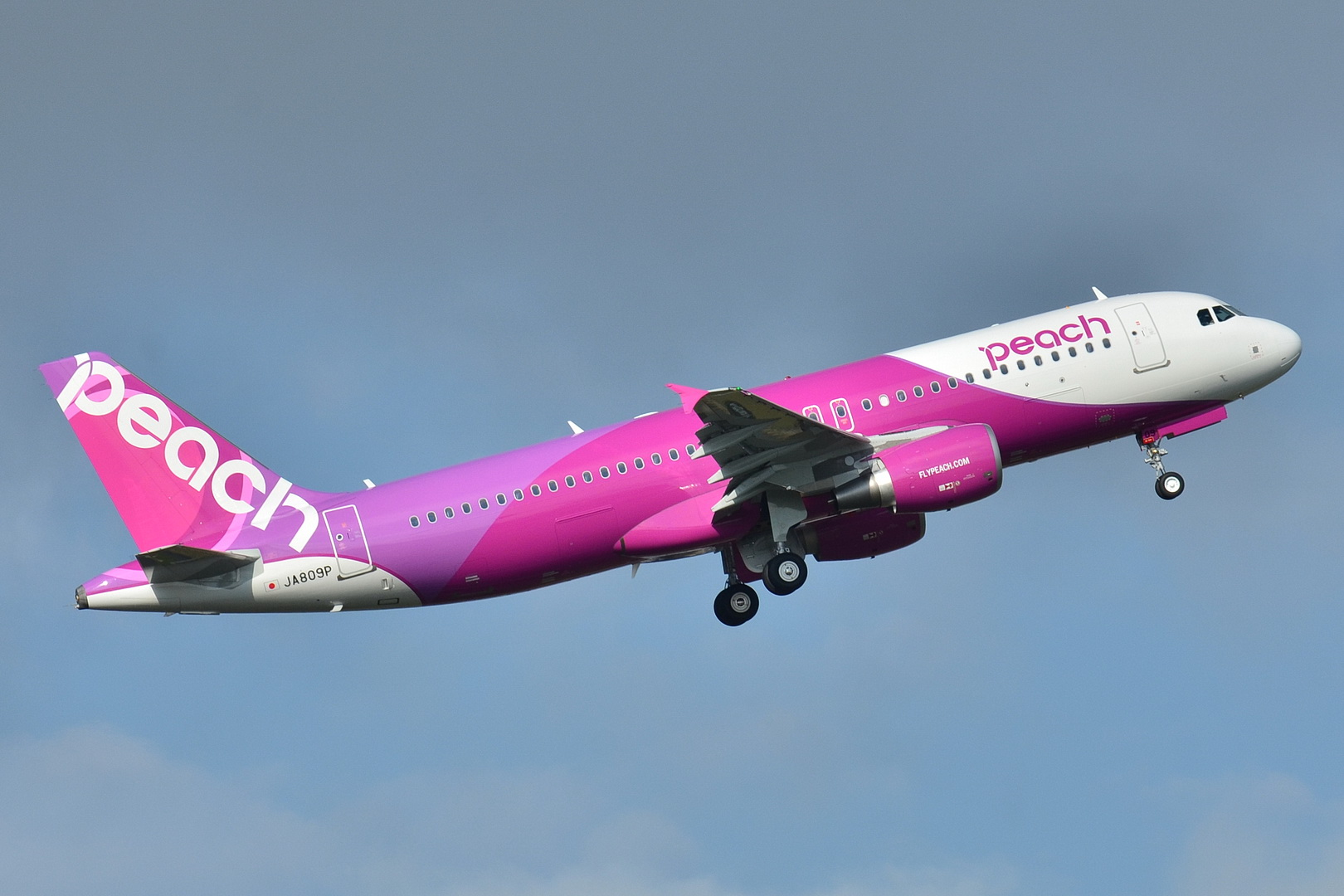
Peach Airbus A320, 2013

The livery of Peach consists of a pink, purple and white colour scheme. The fuselage and vertical stabilizer are painted in pink and purple except for the front fuselage, which is painted in white. The brand name 'Peach' is painted on the vertical stabilizer and the front fuselage. Both wingtips are painted in pink.

Peach unveiled some special liveries as collab campaigns with brands, such as Kadokawa's Kantai Collection on an Airbus A320-200 (register code JA816P) on 26 May 2017, Toei Animation's Soaring Sky! Pretty Cure similarly on Airbus A320-200 (register code JA827P) on 4 March 2023, and Japanese band Back Number on another A320-200 (register code JA826P) on 6 June 2023.

Peach announced a branding refresh and a new livery on 1 April 2026.

== Accidents and incidents ==
- On 28 April 2019, a Peach flight from New Ishigaki Airport to Naha Airport descended to an altitude of 248 feet (76 m) above the ocean, after its pilot misunderstood instructions from air traffic control. The aircraft's ground proximity warning system alerted the pilot to the low altitude, and the plane landed safely at Naha.

== See also ==
- List of airlines of Japan
