= Oita Airport =

Airport in Kunisaki, Japan

Oita Airport 大分空港 Ōita Kūkō
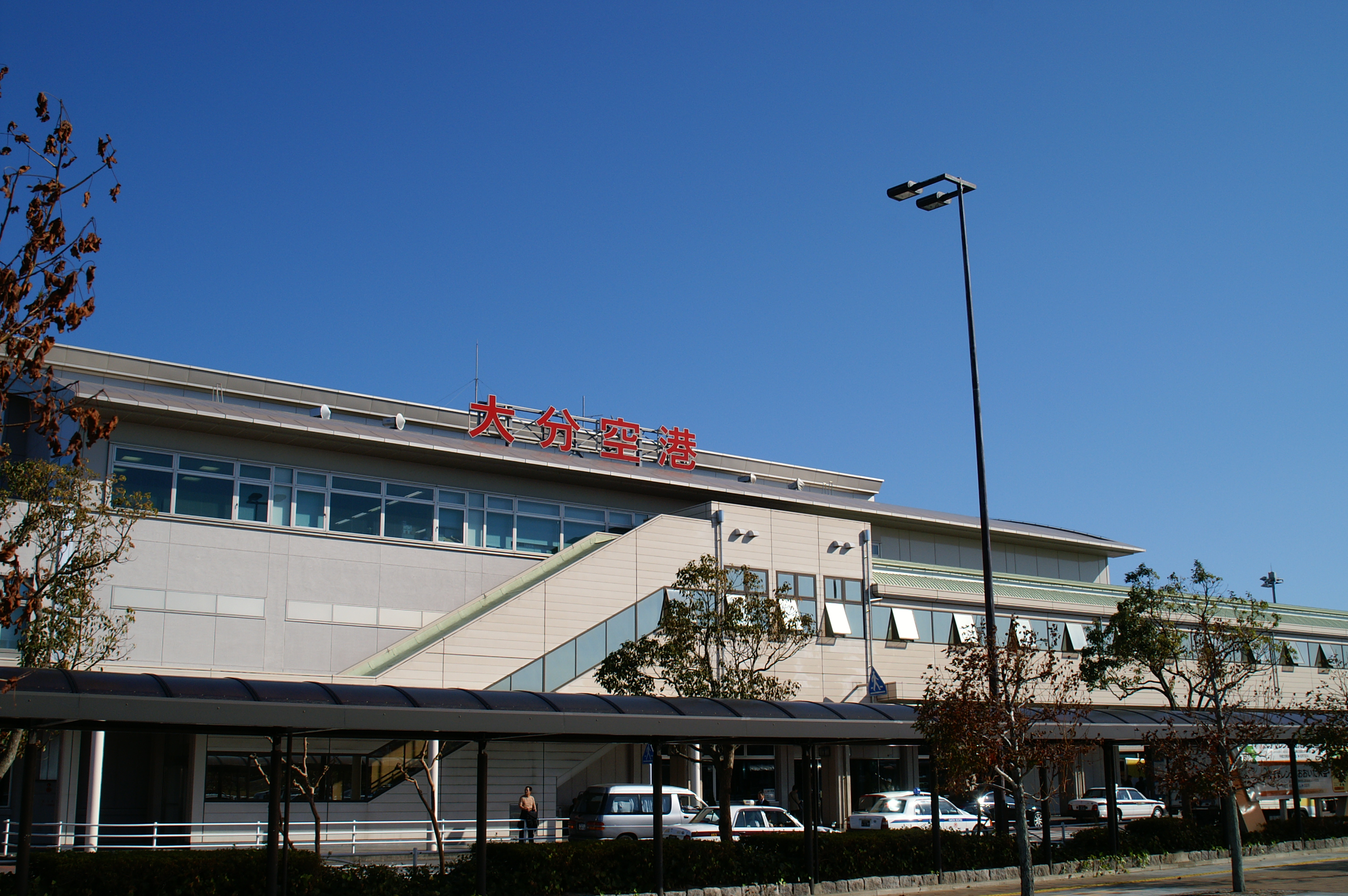
- Oita Airport
- IATA: OIT; ICAO: RJFO

Summary
- Airport type: Public
- Serves: Ōita
- Location: Kunisaki, Ōita Prefecture, Japan
- Opened: 1971; 55 years ago
- Elevation AMSL: 17 ft (5.2 m)
- Coordinates: 33°28′46″N 131°44′14″E
- Website: www.oita-airport.jp/en/

Map
- Location in Ōita Prefecture Location in Japan

Runways
Direction	Length		Surface
Direction	m	ft	Surface
01/19	3,000	9,843	Asphalt

Statistics (2015)
- Passengers: 1,849,834
- Cargo (metric tonnes): 8,213
- Aircraft movement: 21,711
- Source: Japanese Ministry of Land, Infrastructure, Transport and Tourism

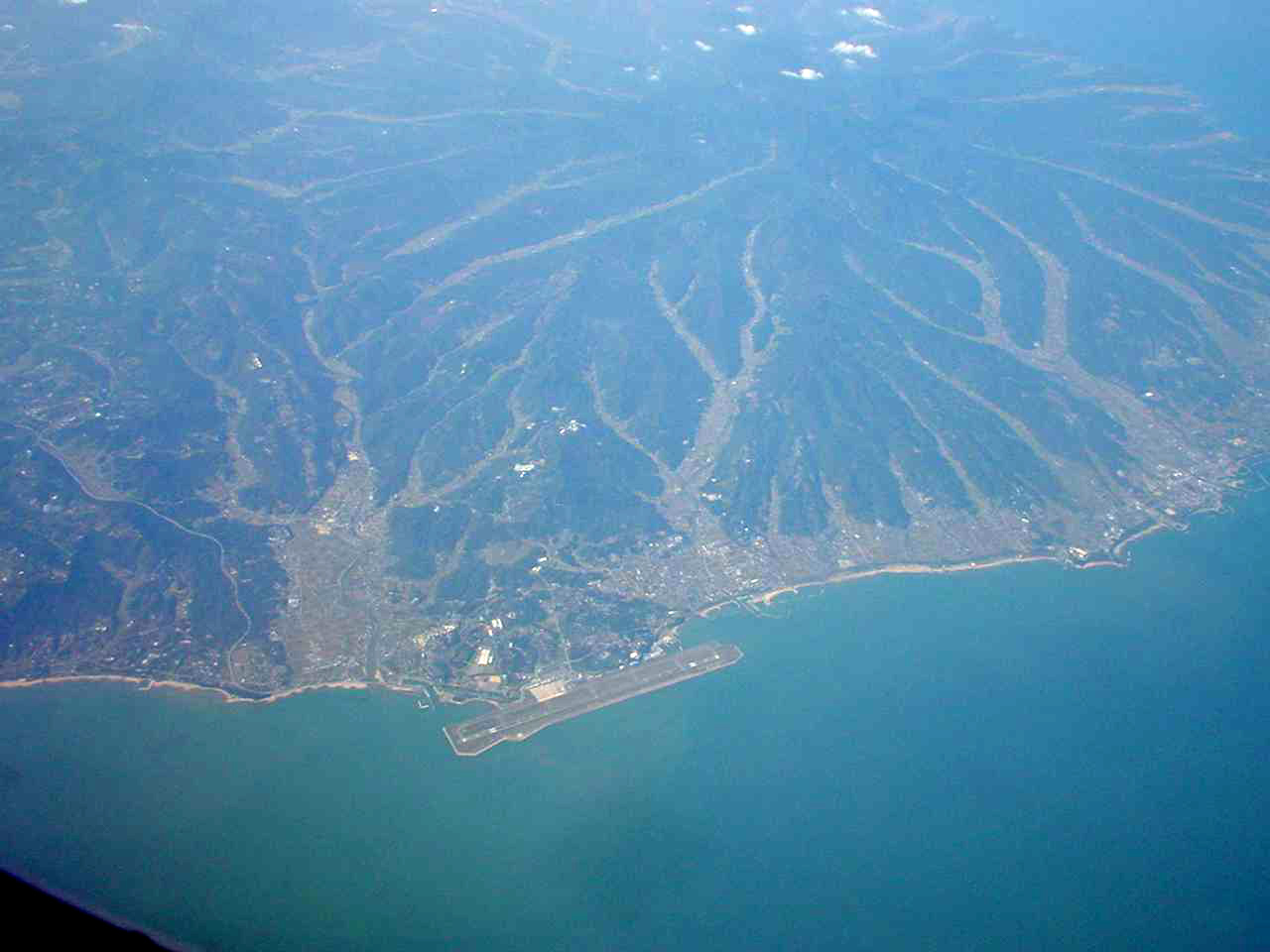
Aerial view of Oita Airport

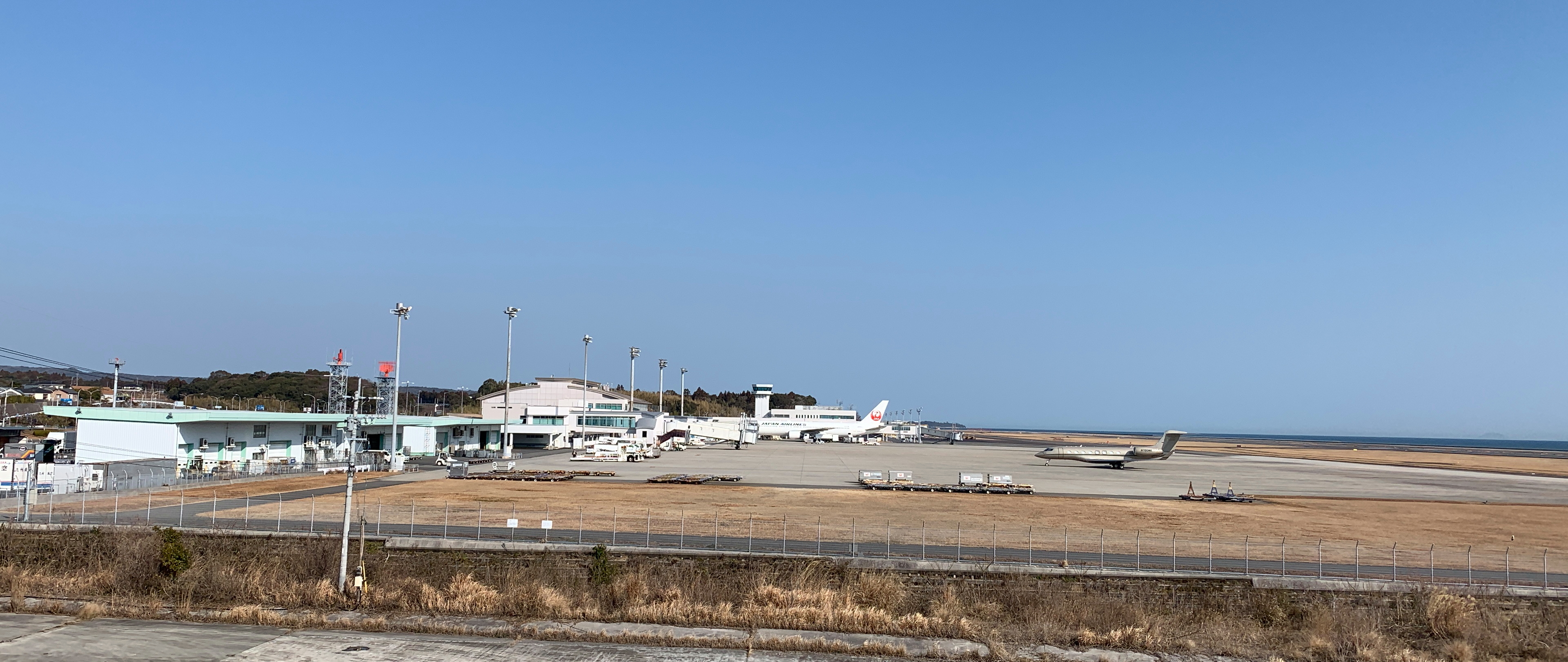
Oita Airport to be developed as a horizontal spaceport

Oita Airport (大分空港, Ōita Kūkō) (IATA: OIT, ICAO: RJFO) is an international airport in Kunisaki City, Ōita Prefecture, Japan, 16 NM (30 km; 18 mi) northeast of Ōita City.

Oita Airport is an offshore airport built on reclaimed coastal waters off the Kunisaki Peninsula. It opened as New Oita Airport in 1971 as a replacement for the old Oita Airport within Oita City.

In 2018, the airport had 2.1 million passengers.

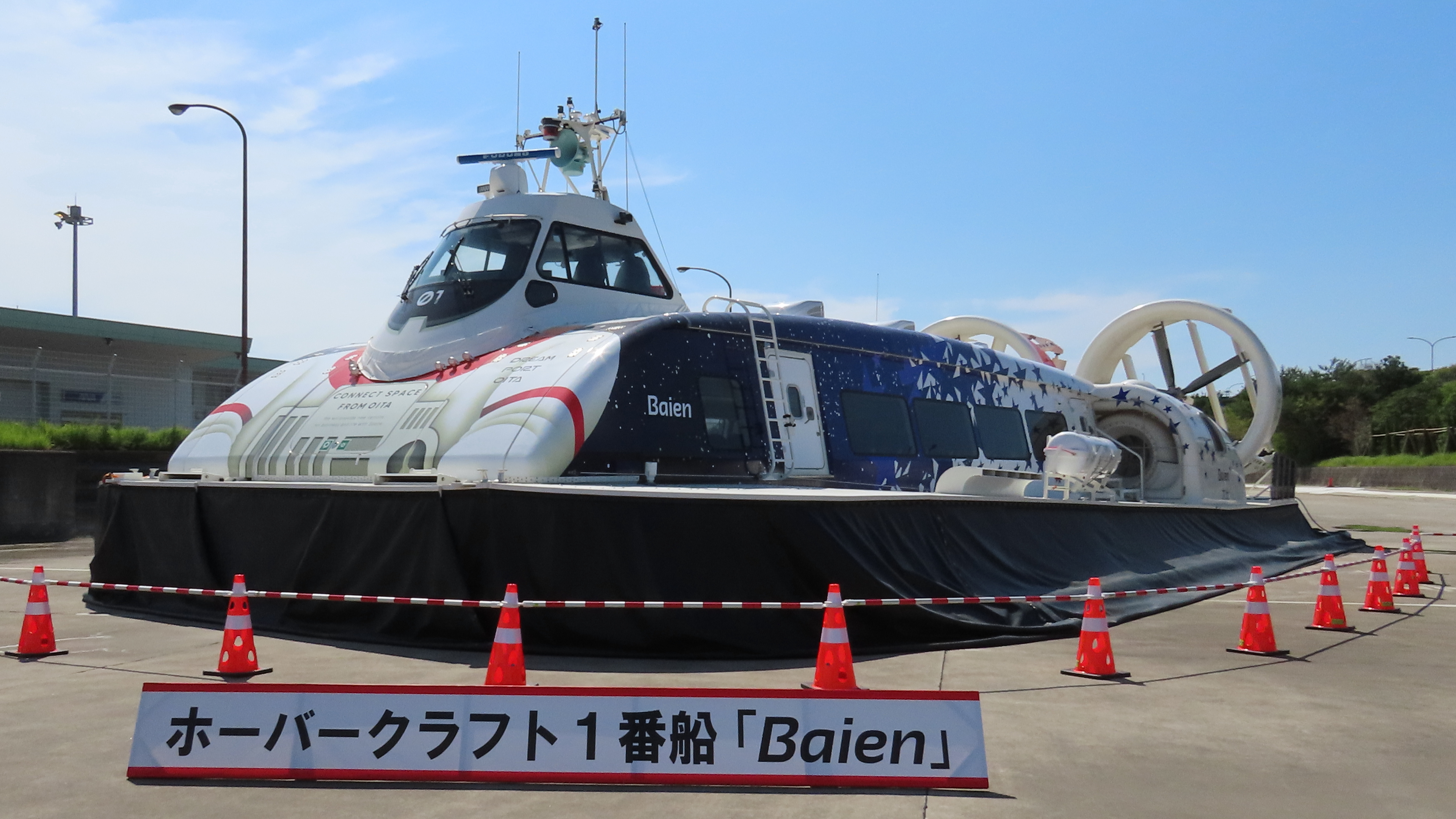
Hovercraft to be reintroduced at Oita Airport

In 2021, Virgin Orbit announced plans to use Oita Airport for its launch site. However, the company went bankrupt in 2023. Oita Prefecture plans to continue developing Oita Airport as Japan's first spaceport.

On March 17, 2025, it was announced that Oita Airport would be temporarily renamed "Oita Hello Kitty Airport" during the 2025 World Expo in Osaka.

== Access ==
Oita Airport is connected by bus to various cities throughout the prefecture. The airport is not accessible by train.

=== Hovercraft ===
Oita Airport is connected to the prefectural capital, Ōita City, by daily hovercraft service.

The hovercraft route was introduced in 1971, but discontinued in 2009 following a decline in ridership. In 2020, it was announced that hovercraft service would be reintroduced at Oita Airport with three new hovercraft. After a series of accidents during training caused a delay of more than a year from the originally scheduled start of operations, regular service began in July 2025. Whereas the route between Oita Airport and Ōita City takes about an hour by road, it takes about 35 minutes by hovercraft.

== Airlines and destinations ==
Airlines	Destinations
All Nippon Airways	Tokyo–Haneda
ANA Wings	Osaka–Itami
Ibex Airlines	Nagoya–Centrair
J-Air	Osaka–Itami
Japan Airlines	Tokyo–Haneda
Jeju Air	Seoul–Incheon
Jetstar Japan	Tokyo–Narita
Korean Air	Seoul–Incheon
Peach	Tokyo–Narita
Solaseed Air	Tokyo–Haneda
Tigerair Taiwan	Taipei–Taoyuan
Trinity Airways	Seasonal: Seoul–Incheon

== Accidents and incidents ==
- On February 22, 1964, Fuji Airlines Flight 902 [jp] traveling from Kagoshima Airport overran the runway upon landing at the former Oita Airport. The Convair CV-240 then fell into the dried-up Urakawa River, killing 20 of the 42 on board. The accident was caused by pilot error and poor structure of the former Oita Airport leading to closure of the former airport in 1971. There is a memorial for the victims at the site of the old runway.
- At 14:10 on 28 January 2024, a HondaJet light business aircraft on a training flight from Oita Airport overshot the runway while landing and came to a stop on nearby grass, forcing the airport's closure for at least an hour and the cancellation of four flights. None of the three people aboard the plane were injured.

== Facilities ==
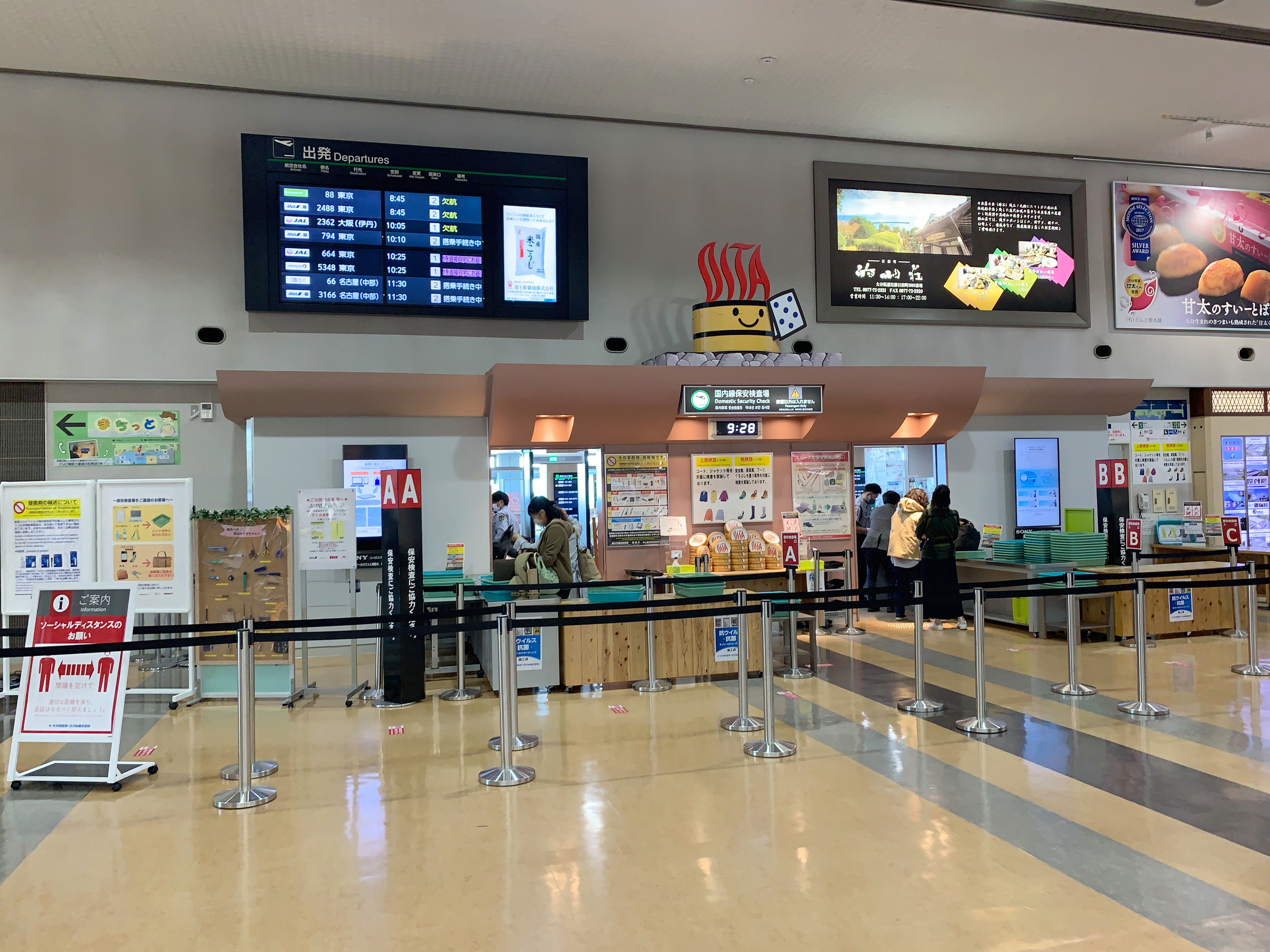
Security check (second floor)

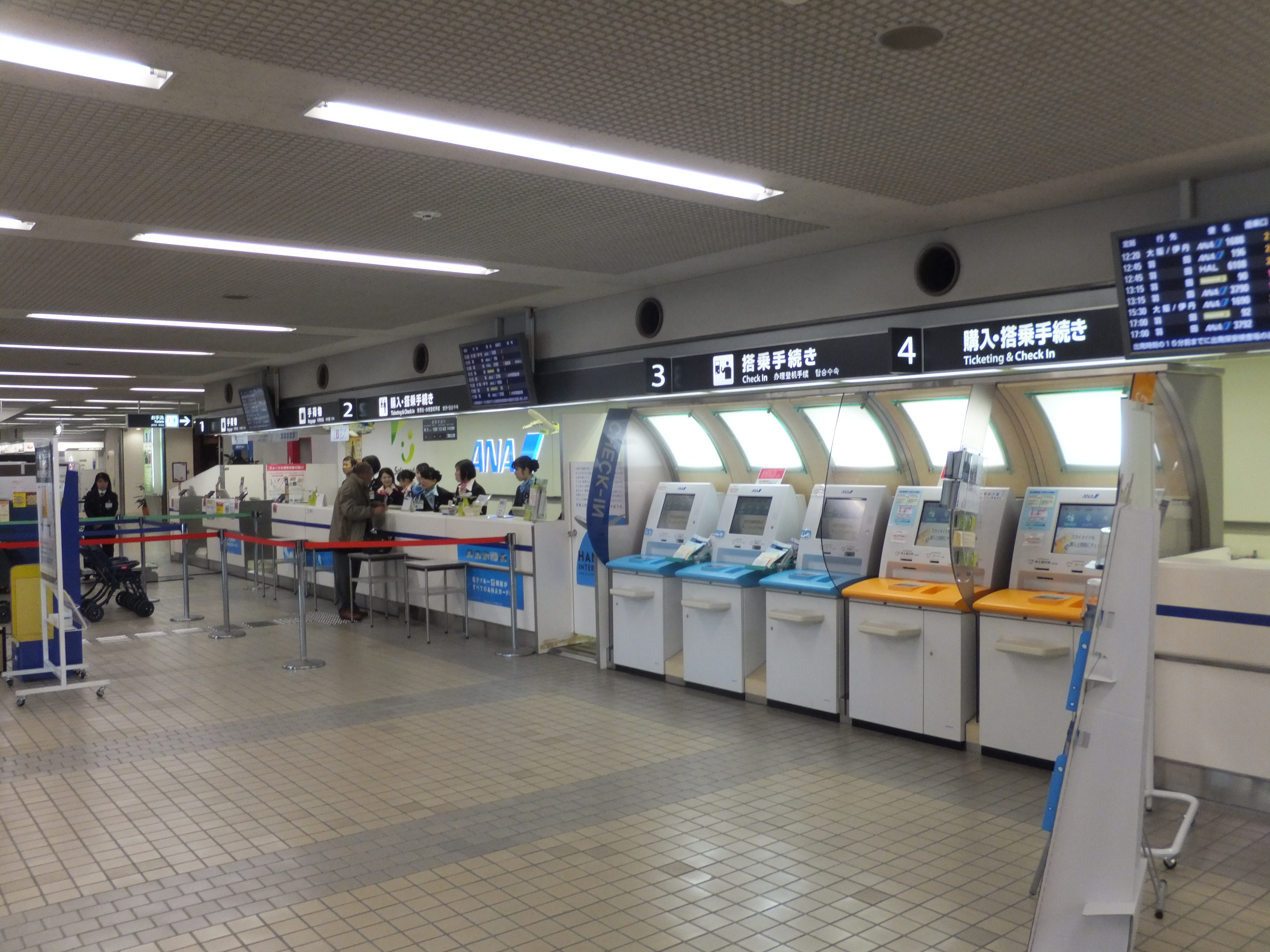
Check-in counter (first floor)

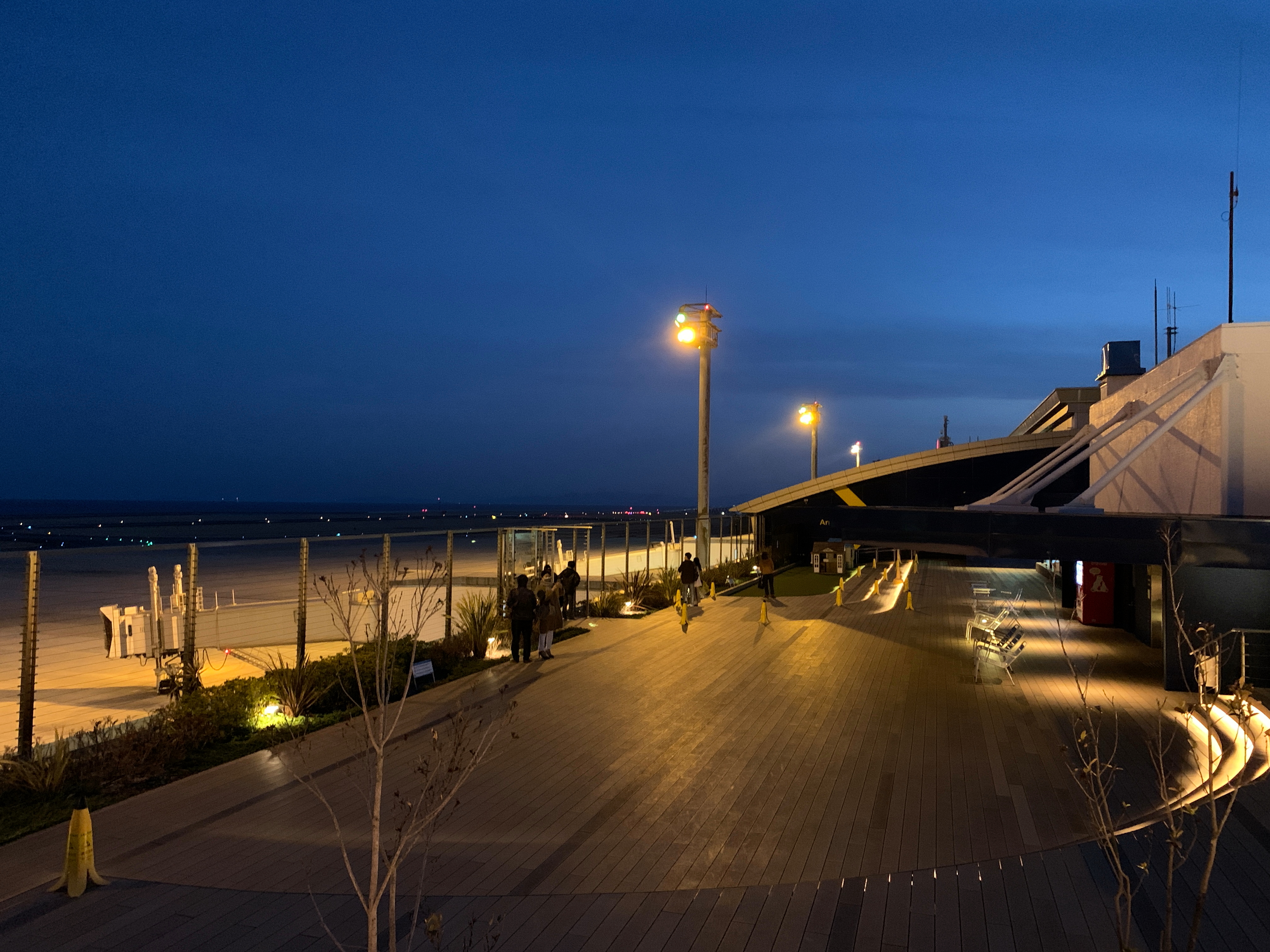
Observation deck (third floor)

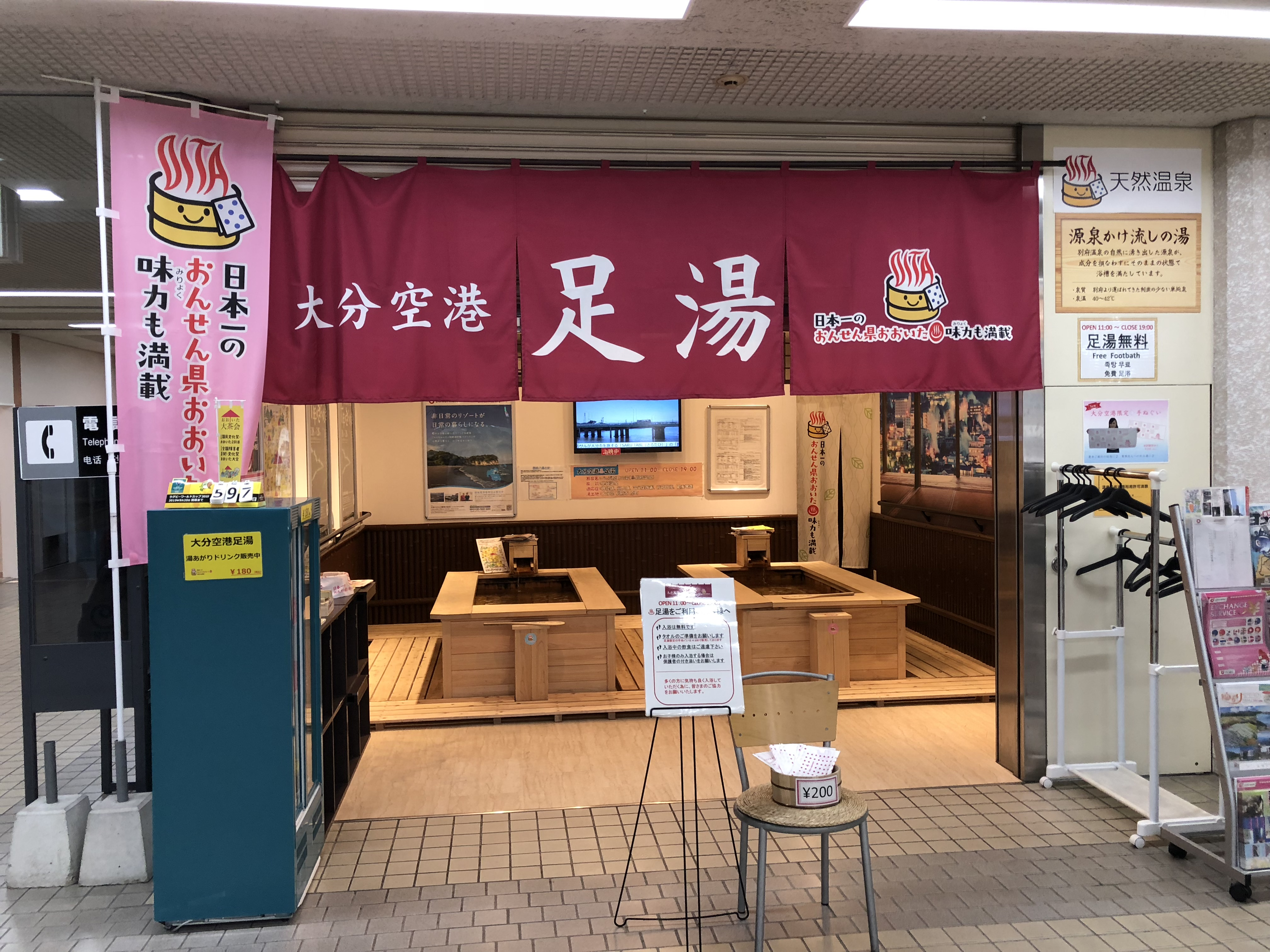
Foot bath (first floor)

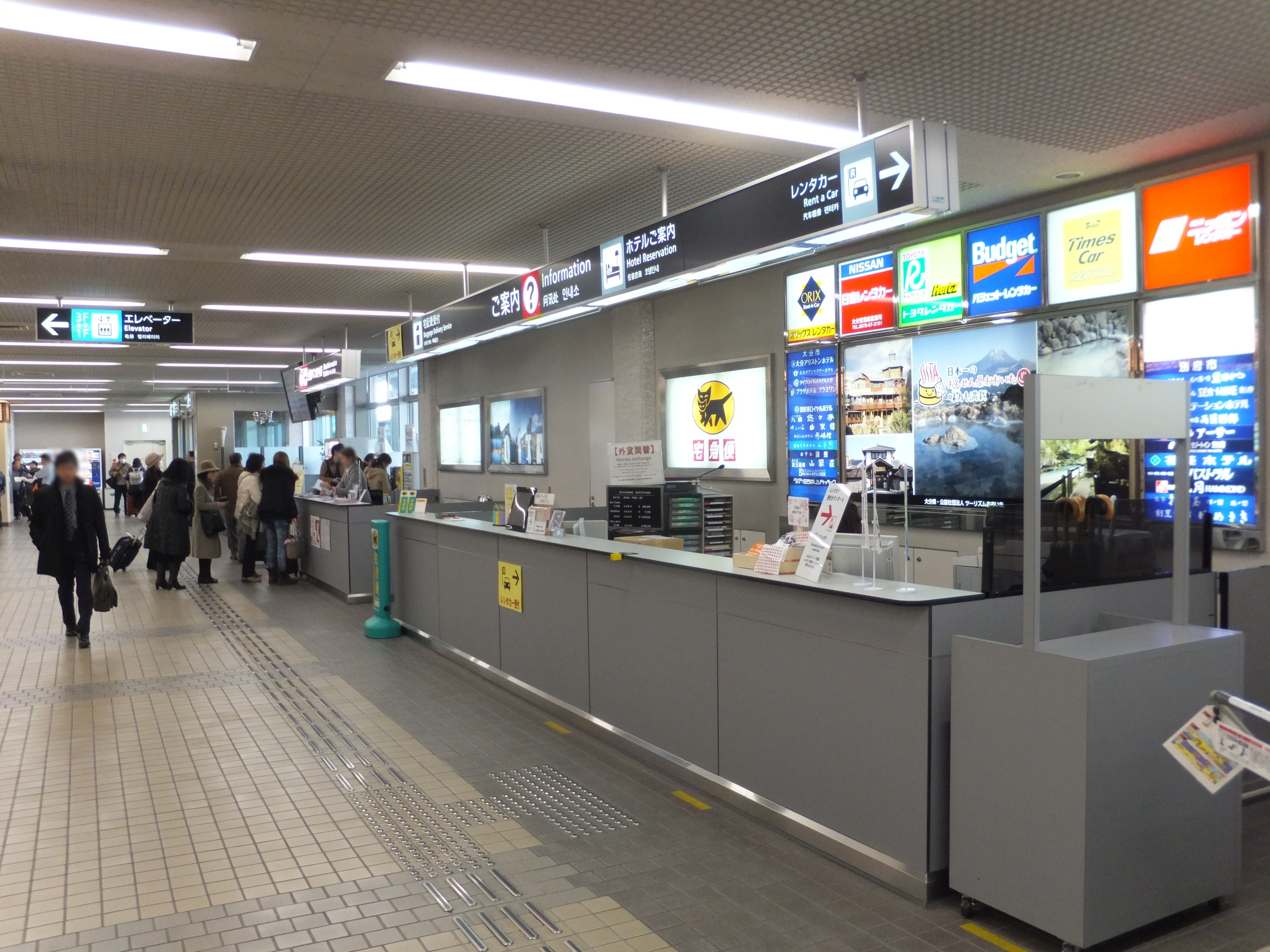
Information counter (first floor)

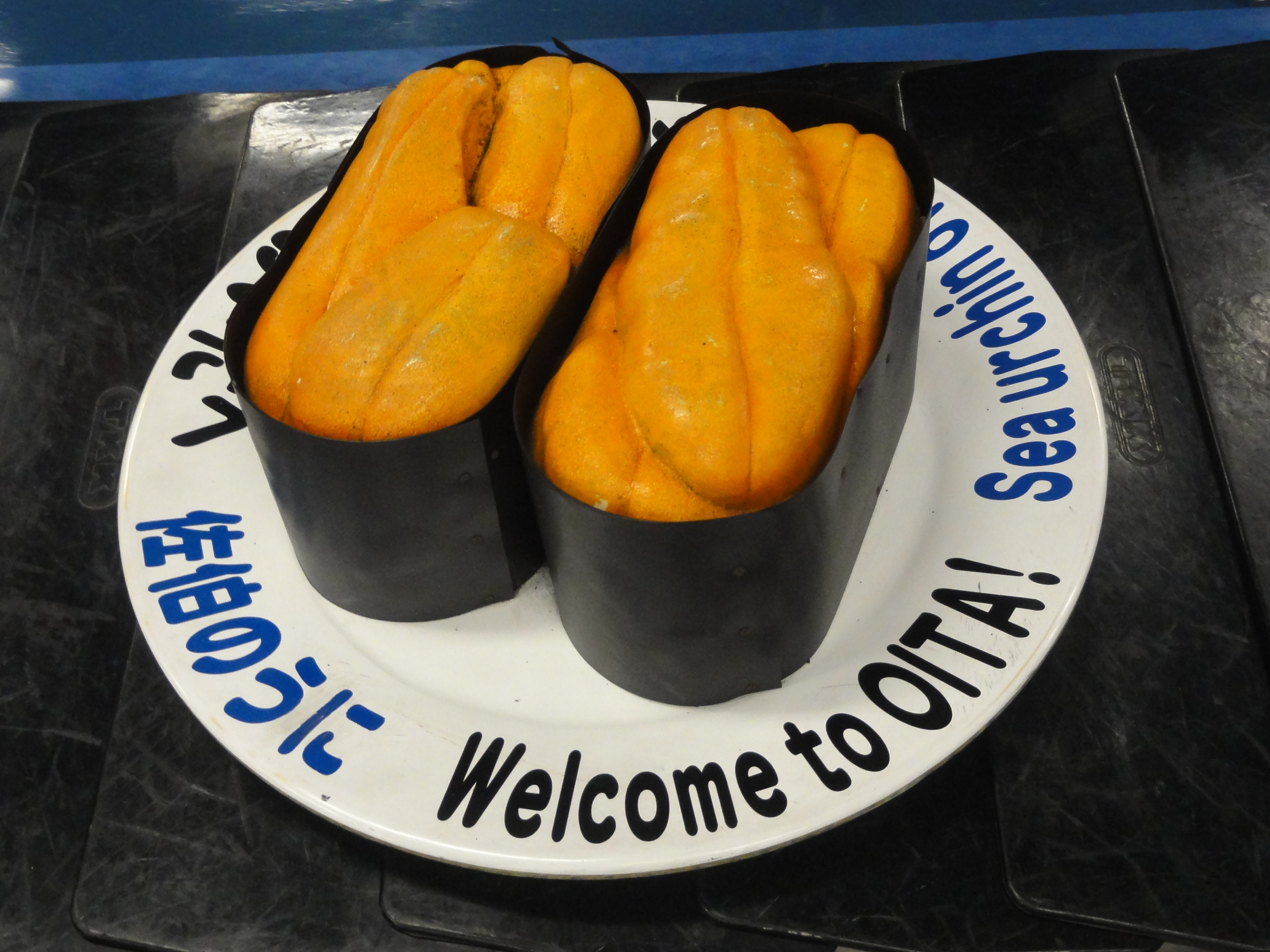
Model to resemble conveyor belt sushi at baggage claim
