= Jetstar Japan =

Low-cost airline of Japan

Jetstar Japan Co., Ltd. ジェットスター・ジャパン株式会社 Jettosutā Japan Kabushiki-gaisha

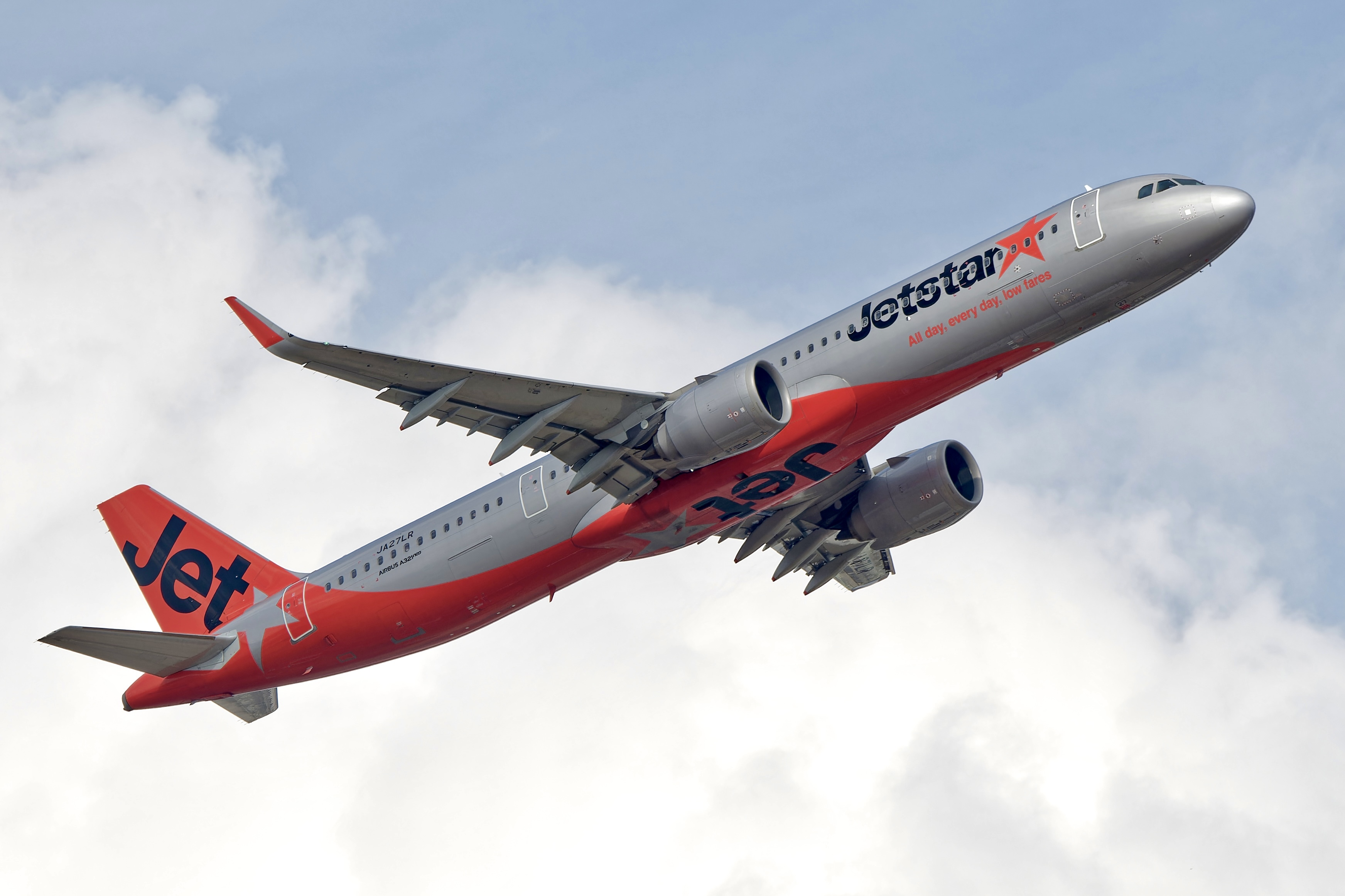
- Jetstar Japan Airbus A321LR
IATA	ICAO	Call sign
GK	JJP	ORANGE LINER
- Founded: 2011; 15 years ago
- Commenced operations: July 3, 2012; 14 years ago
- Operating bases: Nagoya–Centrair; Osaka–Kansai; Tokyo–Narita
- Frequent-flyer program: Qantas Frequent Flyer; JAL Mileage Bank
- Fleet size: 23
- Destinations: 20
- Parent company: Qantas (33.3%); Japan Airlines (50%); Tokyo Century (16.7%)
- Headquarters: Narita, Chiba Prefecture, Japan
- Key people: Masakazu Tanaka (Representative Director & CEO)
- Revenue: JPY 29.1 billion (June 2014)
- Operating income: JPY -11.1 billion (FY June 2014)
- Website: www.jetstar.com/jp/en/home

Jetstar Japan is a Japanese low-cost airline headquartered in Narita, Chiba Prefecture. The airline serves destinations across the Asia-Pacific region, using a fleet of Airbus A320 family aircraft. It is a joint venture between Qantas, Japan Airlines and Tokyo Century Corporation, which owns 33.3%, 50% and 16.7% stakes respectively. On 3 February 2026, Qantas announced it would sell its stake in Jetstar Japan, with the airline to be rebranded by June 2027.

== History ==
=== Launch (2012–2014) ===
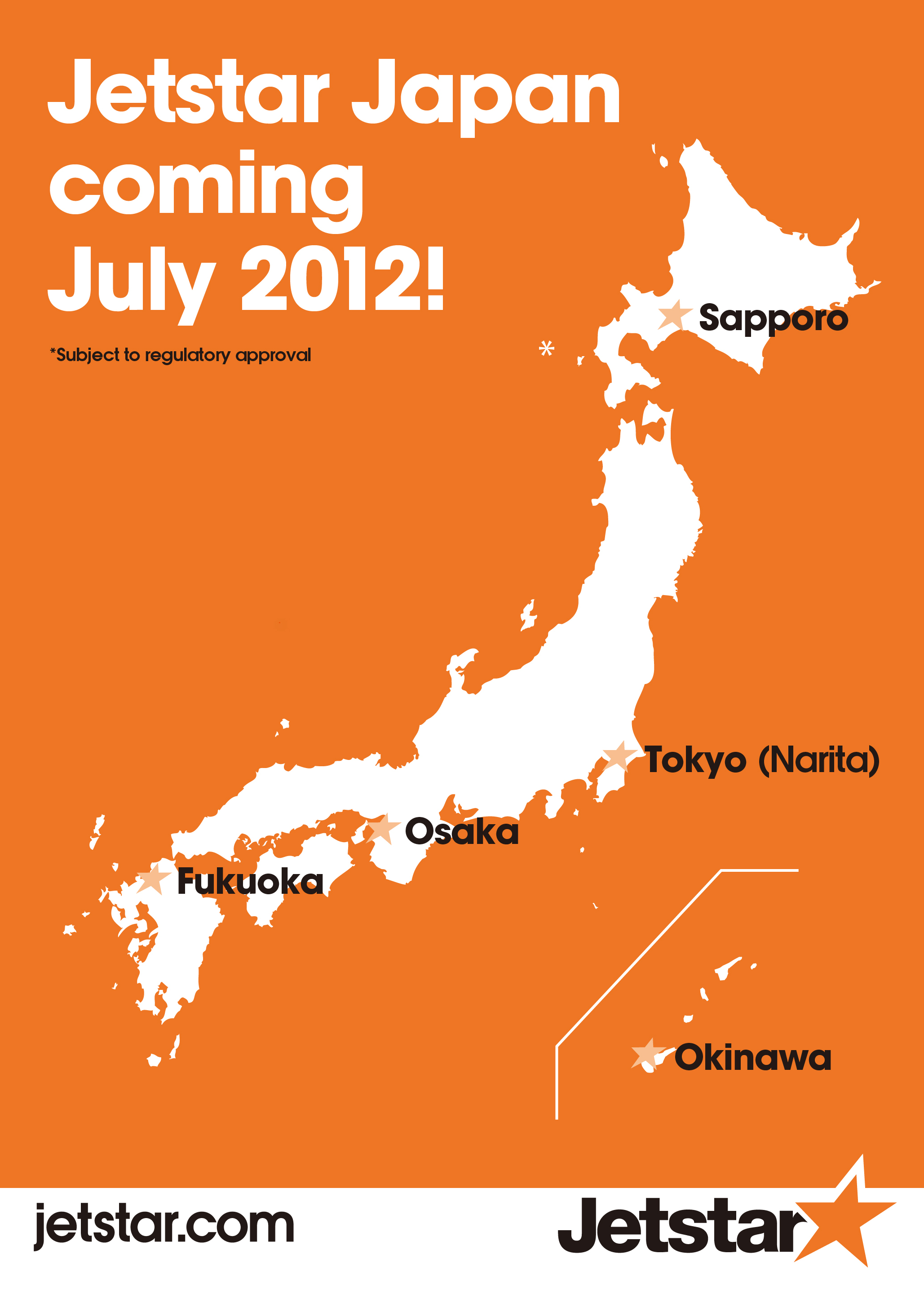
Jetstar Japan's promotional launch graphic, highlighting its July 2012 inauguration with Fukuoka, Okinawa, Osaka, Sapporo, and Tokyo Narita as its first five destinations

Initially planned to commence flights in late 2012, Jetstar Japan launched ahead of schedule on 3 July 2012 using Tokyo's Narita International Airport as a base. On 6 April 2012, the airline was granted an air operator's certificate by the Japanese Ministry of Land, Infrastructure, and Transport (MLITT), in preparation for the airline's launch of services. The first route to be served was between Tokyo Narita and Fukuoka on 3 July 2012, while services between Tokyo Narita and Okinawa (Naha Airport), Osaka (Kansai), and Sapporo (New Chitose) began on 9 July 2012. Services from Osaka Kansai to Fukuoka and Sapporo followed afterwards, on 24 August 2012.

The airline also announced that it would establish a second base at Kansai International Airport in Osaka, and started service between Osaka Kansai and Okinawa on 28 October 2012. The Kansai base was originally planned to open on 18 July 2013, but the opening was postponed due to issues in improving maintenance procedures following a warning from the MLITT. In July 2013, the airline's chief executive officer (CEO) Miyuki Suzuki (鈴木 みゆき, Suzuki Miyuki) announced that Jetstar Japan's network strategy would be focused on the domestic market from Tokyo Narita for the foreseeable future, and that the company would try to optimize its schedule for connecting traffic with international flights operated by Australian-based Jetstar Airways. Suzuki later stated in August 2013 that Jetstar Japan hoped to decide the timing of the Kansai base opening within 2014.

While waiting for approval of the Osaka Kansai base, Jetstar Japan opened a number of additional domestic routes from Tokyo Narita, and announced the establishment of a new base at Nagoya's Chubu Centrair International Airport. On 31 March 2013, Jetstar launched service from Tokyo Narita to Oita and Kagoshima, while also adding three routes from Nagoya Centrair to Fukuoka, Sapporo, and Kagoshima on the same day. On 31 May 2013, the services from both Tokyo Narita and Nagoya Centrair to Kagoshima commenced, while on 11 June 2013, Matsuyama Airport became Jetstar Japan's ninth destination with services to Tokyo Narita. On 10 December 2013, Jetstar Japan launched twice daily service between Tokyo Narita and Takamatsu Airport.

Following airport maintenance delays, Jetstar Japan's base at Osaka's Kansai International Airport opened in June 2014, with frequencies increased on the airline's existing routes between the airport and Fukuoka, Okinawa, Sapporo, and Tokyo Narita. While no new routes were added to the base at its induction, Jetstar Japan announced on 16 July 2014 the addition of daily service to Oita Airport from 9 October 2014, and announced further expansion on 20 August 2014 with the addition of twice daily service to Kumamoto Airport starting on 26 October 2014. Additionally, twice daily service to Kumamoto was also planned from both Nagoya Centrair and Tokyo Nartia on the same date.

Following the opening of the airline's Osaka Kansai base in June 2014, CEO Miyuki Suzuki confirmed that deliveries of the airline's remaining A320s on order would be slowed down and spread throughout the next fiscal year. She also stated Jetstar Japan's plans to commence international operations in the coming winter season, with initial destinations under consideration being within four or five hours of travel time from the airline's Tokyo Narita base.

In July 2014, Jetstar Japan announced the establishment of codeshare and frequent-flyer program agreements with parent airline company Japan Airlines, a fellow Oneworld airline of its own parent airline company Qantas. This gave the airline a distinction from traditional low-cost carriers, such as Peach and Vanilla Air, which were both affiliated with All Nippon Airways but lacked similar agreements with ANA. Additionally, Jetstar Japan began offering international connections with both Japan Airlines and Australian-based Jetstar Airways. From October 2014, American Airlines joined as a codeshare partner, followed by Jetstar Japan's own parent company airline Qantas which joined as a codeshare partner in January 2015.

=== International services and expansion (2014–2026) ===
On 3 December 2014, Jetstar Japan announced the long-delayed commencement of international service, with its first service to connect Osaka Kansai with Hong Kong International Airport. The service was planned to initially operate three times per week, with additional frequencies added over time. On 16 March 2015, it was announced that services to Hong Kong would increase with two additional weekly frequencies, operating five weekly flights from 18 July 2015 to 31 August 2015, and four weekly flights from 1 September 2015 to 24 October 2015. On 21 January 2015, Jetstar Japan announced a new daily service between Nagoya Centrair and Okinawa would commence from 29 March 2015. However, the net amount of services from Nagoya Centrair were planned to remain the same, with the service to Okinawa replacing one of the two daily services to Kumamoto. In turn, the number of daily departures from Kumamoto Airport reduced from six to five.

On 1 April 2015, it was announced that CEO Miyuki Suzuki had decided to resign, with Jetstar Group Executive Gerry Turner taking her place as CEO. Masaru Kataoka was also to take up the role of company chairman.

On 7 April 2015, Jetstar Japan announced its first international service from Tokyo, with the commencement of service between Tokyo Narita and Hong Kong International Airport initially at a frequency of three weekly flights starting from 1 June 2015, before advancing the service to daily from 1 September. On 5 August 2015, the airline carried its ten millionth passenger. On 19 August 2015, it was announced that services between Nagoya Centrair and Kumamoto along with the daily service between Osaka and Oita would be discontinued at the end of the summer season on 25 October 2015. On 13 October 2015, the airline announced that service to Taipei Taoyuan would commence from Tokyo Narita, Osaka Kansai, and Nagoya Centrair. Services were planned with an initial frequency of three weekly flights, with additional plans to increase the frequency to daily by the end of 2015.

In early 2016, it was announced on 15 January that services between Osaka Kansai and Kumamoto would be discontinued at the beginning of the summer timetable on 27 March, while on 21 January, it was announced that new service linking Tokyo Narita, Osaka Kansai, and Nagoya Centrair with Manila's Ninoy Aquino International Airport would be inaugurated in March. The airline became the first Japanese low-cost carrier to serve Manila, which was also the airline's third international destination. However, on 1 July 2016, Jetstar Japan cancelled the service between Osaka Kansai and Manila, while services to Manila from Nagoya and Tokyo Narita were temporarily suspended until 1 September 2016.

On 9 August 2016, Jetstar Japan gained approval from the Civil Aviation Administration of China to serve four routes between Japan and China, consisting of Tokyo and Osaka to Shanghai and Guangzhou. On 23 August 2016, the airline was confirmed to have made its first profit, and also announced plans to grow its fleet from the current 20 aircraft to 28 over the next three years.

On 27 November 2018, Jetstar Japan announced that it was considering the opening of a fourth base in Japan, following Tokyo Narita, Osaka Kansai, and Nagoya Centrair. In April 2019, Jetstar Japan announced a new domestic route between Tokyo Narita and Shonai Airport, beginning on 1 August 2019. In June 2020, one of the airline's Airbus A321LRs was shown during production in a revised livery.

=== Rebrand (2026–present) ===
On 3 February 2026, Qantas announced its intention to sell its share in Jetstar Japan to the Development Bank of Japan, with Japan Airlines and Tokyo Century retaining their ownership. The deal was formally announced in August 2026. Following the transfer of Qantas's share, the airline will be rebranded, with the new identity to be announced by the end of 2026 and completed by June 2027.

== Corporate affairs ==
=== Corporate structure and capitalisation ===
The head office of Jetstar Japan is in Narita, Chiba Prefecture. The airline is owned by Japan Airlines (50%), Tokyo Century Corporation (16.7%) and Australian flag-carrier Qantas (33.3%), who own the Jetstar brand. Total capitalisation committed to the new airline has been up to ¥12 billion. Prior to 2019, Mitsubishi Corporation owned a 16.7% stake in the airline which was purchased by Japan Airlines in 2019, increasing its stake from 33.3% to 50%.

In November 2013, Qantas and Japan Airlines each injected ¥5.5 billion of fresh capital in the form of non-voting shares. This kept the ownership structure the same however both Qantas and Japan Airlines economic interest in Jetstar Japan rose to 45.7% each.

In November 2014, Qantas and Japan Airlines each agreed to inject a further ¥5.5 billion of fresh capital in the form of non-voting shares. This capital injection was to be undertaken in two tranches and was the second re-capitalisation in under a year. The issuance of non-voting shares kept the ownership structure the same, however, both Qantas' and Japan Airlines' economic interest in Jetstar Japan rose to 47.1% each. The first tranche totaling ¥7 billion was injected in November 2014 with the second tranche of ¥4 billion paid in July 2015.

In August 2015, at the announcement of Qantas' annual financial results, it was revealed that further capital injections would take place into Jetstar Japan totaling ¥10 billion. No dates were announced for when the capital would be injected, although it was planned to be done in two tranches with the first consisting of ¥7 billion, and the second of ¥3 billion.

=== Financial performance ===
For the fiscal year ending on 30 June 2013, Jetstar Japan earned total revenue of JPY 12.8 billion and made a loss of JPY 8.8 billion.

For the fiscal year ending on 30 June 2014, Jetstar Japan's total revenue increased to JPY 29.1 billion but its loss also increased to JPY 11.1 billion.

For the September fiscal quarter of 2014, Japan's Japan's MLITT Domestic market statistics reported that Jetstar Japan had total revenue earned from the domestic market of JPY10,123 million, up 44.1% from the September 2013 quarter. Revenue per passenger was JPY9,000 up 4.7%, Passenger revenue per RPK was JPY8.7 up 8.7% and passenger numbers were 1.1 million which was up 37.2%.

For the December fiscal quarter of 2014, Japan's MLITT Domestic market statistics reported that Jetstar Japan had total revenue earned from the domestic market of JPY7,818 million, up 46.2% from the December 2013 quarter. Revenue per passenger was JPY7,600 up 10.1%, Passenger revenue per RPK was JPY7.6 up 15.2% and passenger numbers were 1 million which was up 31.2%.

For the March fiscal quarter of 2015, Japan's MLITT Domestic market statistics reported that Jetstar Japan had total revenue earned from the domestic market of JPY8,982 million, up 69.3% from the March 2014 quarter. Revenue per passenger was JPY7,600 up 20.6%, Passenger revenue per RPK was JPY7.6 up 24.6% and passenger numbers were 1.2 million which was up 39.3%.

For the June fiscal quarter of 2015, Japan's MLITT Domestic market statistics reported that Jetstar Japan had total revenue earned from the domestic market of JPY8,005 million, up 40.1% from the June 2014 quarter. Revenue per passenger was JPY6,800 up 3.4%, Passenger revenue per RPK was JPY6.5 up 0.9% and passenger numbers were 1.2 million which was up 35.5%.

This means that for the fiscal year ending on 30 June 2015, the total domestic revenue of Jetstar Japan was JPY34.928 billion, which does not include revenue from international operations or ancillary services.

== Destinations ==
Jetstar Japan flies to 20 destinations in the Asia-Pacific region. While the airline mostly operates domestic flights within Japan, it also operates international flights to China, Hong Kong, the Philippines, and Taiwan.

=== Codeshare agreements ===
Jetstar Japan has codeshare agreements with the following airlines:

- American Airlines
- Japan Airlines
- Qantas

== Fleet ==
As of July 2026, Jetstar Japan operates the following aircraft:

Jetstar Japan fleet
Aircraft	In service	Orders	Passengers	Notes
Airbus A320-200	20	4	180	Aircraft returning from lease in Australia following the closure of Jetstar Asia.
Airbus A321LR	3	—	232	
Total	23	5		

=== Fleet development ===
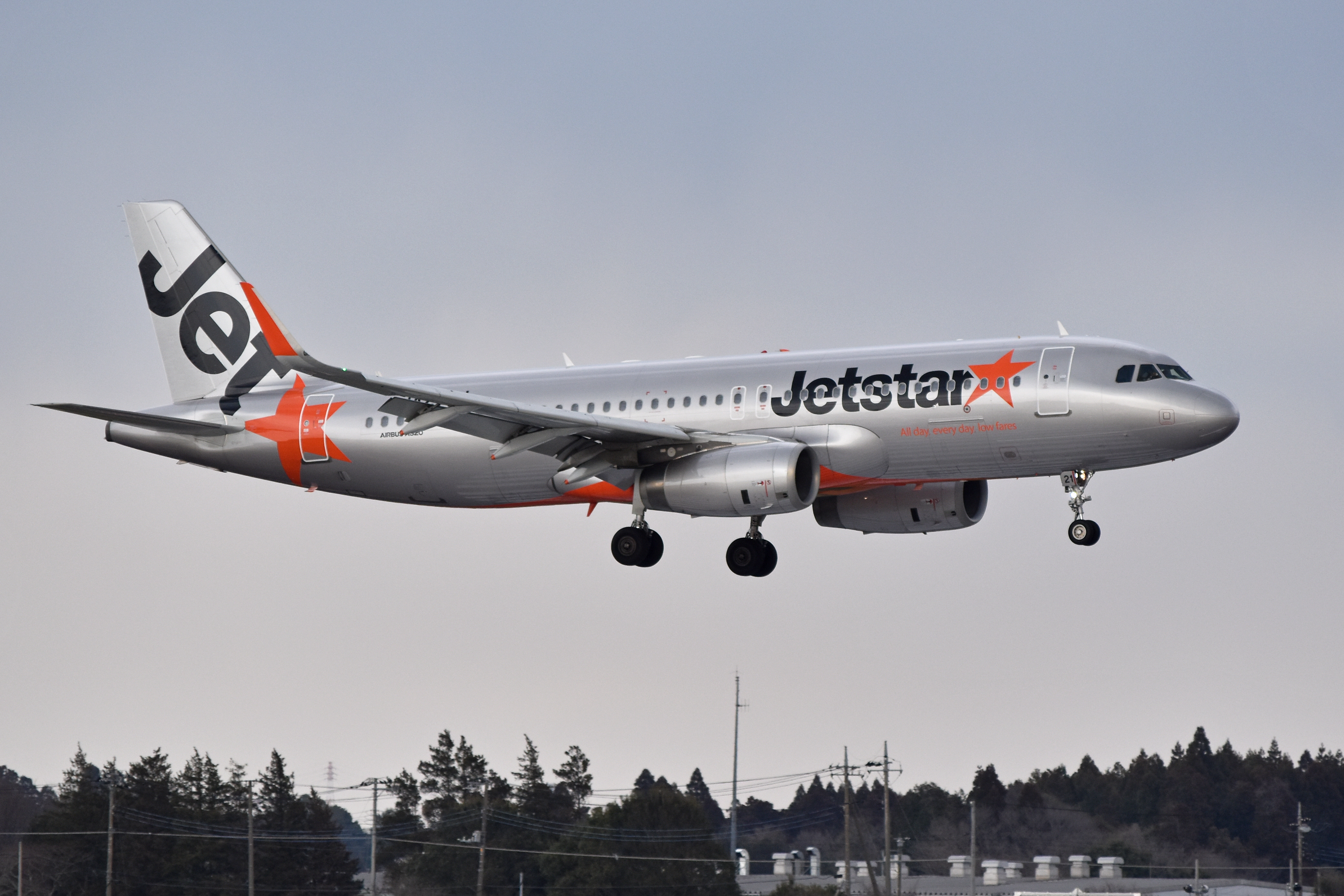
Jetstar Japan Airbus A320-200

Jetstar Japan began operations with three aircraft, and up to October 2013 was adding a new aircraft every four to six weeks. The airline planned to expand its initial fleet of three Airbus A320 aircraft to a total of 24 within the first few years of operation. However, due to delays in opening the second base at Kansai International Airport along with restrictions imposed on the company by Japanese authorities, the company paused its fleet expansion at eighteen aircraft. Fleet expansion restarted in October 2014 with two new A320s delivered prior to the end of that year.

On 30 November 2018, three Airbus A321LR aircraft were allocated to Jetstar Japan between the 18 A321LRs ordered by Qantas for its Jetstar affiliate airlines, with delivery of the jets originally planned for mid 2020, but subsequently deferred to 2021. Unlike Jetstar's A321LRs which were revealed to have a seating capacity of 232, Jetstar Japan reported its A321LRs would have a seating capacity of 238. In March 2021, Qantas announced the temporary transfer of up to six of Jetstar Japan's Airbus A320s to Jetstar, citing the slower recovery of Japan's domestic travel market during the COVID-19 pandemic. In June 2025 following the closure of Jetstar Asia, these aircraft have begun being returned to the airline.

=== Former fleet ===
As of February 2026, Jetstar Japan operated 19 Airbus A320 and 3 Airbus A321neo.

== Frequent-flyer program ==
While Jetstar Japan does not have its own frequent-flyer program, it participates in the programs of other airlines, which consist of Emirates Skywards, JAL Mileage Bank, and Qantas Frequent Flyer.

== Marketing ==
Jetstar Japan uses a red panda mascot character named "Jetta" (ジェッ太). The airline later created other characters as Jetta's family, consisting of Papa (パパ), Mama (ママ), Seiko (せいこ), and Hoshimi (ほしみ). The airline created the character since the Japanese business partners of Jetstar argued that mascots bring success to Japan-based businesses. Steve Creedy of The Australian wrote in 2015 that the character "has since become something of a cult figure in Japan."

== See also ==
- Jetstar
- Jetstar Asia
- Jetstar Hong Kong
- Pacific Airlines
