= List of Jetstar Asia destinations =

A Jetstar Asia Airbus A320-200 at Kansai International Airport, Osaka in 2015

Jetstar Asia's first flight took off on 13 December 2004 to Hong Kong, one of the two initial destinations from Singapore. Jetstar Asia was established six months after Jetstar first commenced its domestic operation in Australia.

The destinations below were operated by Jetstar Asia. The list does not include destinations only served by Jetstar.

The airline ceased operations on 31 July 2025.

== Final destinations ==
The list shows airports that have been served by Jetstar Asia as part of its scheduled services from 2004 to 2025. The list includes the city, country, codes of the International Air Transport Association (IATA airport code) and the International Civil Aviation Organization (ICAO airport code), and the airport's name, with the airline's hub marked. The list also contains the beginning, and, if the destination was terminated, the end year of services. Additionally, destinations which have been served non-continuously have been marked (services to those destinations have been suspended or terminated and subsequently resumed or recommenced).

| Country | City | Airport | Note | Refs |
|---|---|---|---|---|
| Australia | Broome | Broome International Airport | Terminated | |
| Australia | Cairns | Cairns Airport | Terminated | |
| Australia | Darwin | Darwin International Airport | Terminated | |
| Australia | Perth | Perth Airport | Terminated | |
| Cambodia | Phnom Penh | Phnom Penh International Airport | Terminated | |
| Cambodia | Siem Reap | Siem Reap International Airport | Airport closed | |
| China | Guangzhou | Guangzhou Baiyun International Airport | Terminated | |
| China | Guilin | Guilin Liangjiang International Airport | Terminated | |
| China | Guiyang | Guiyang Longdongbao International Airport | Terminated | |
| China | Haikou | Haikou Meilan International Airport | Terminated | |
| China | Hangzhou | Hangzhou Xiaoshan International Airport | Terminated | |
| China | Hefei | Hefei Xinqiao International Airport | Terminated | |
| China | Hong Kong | Hong Kong International Airport | Terminated | |
| China | Macau | Macau International Airport | Terminated | |
| China | Nanning | Nanning Wuxu International Airport | Terminated | |
| China | Ningbo | Ningbo Lishe International Airport | Terminated | |
| China | Sanya | Sanya Phoenix International Airport | Terminated | |
| China | Shantou | Jieyang Chaoshan International Airport | Terminated | |
| China | Wuxi | Wuxi Shuofang Airport | | |
| China | Xuzhou | Xuzhou Guanyin International Airport | Terminated | |
| India | Bengaluru | Kempegowda International Airport | Terminated | |
| India | Kolkata | Netaji Subhas Chandra Bose International Airport | Terminated | |
| Indonesia | Denpasar | Ngurah Rai International Airport | | |
| Indonesia | Jakarta | Soekarno–Hatta International Airport | | |
| Indonesia | Labuan Bajo | Komodo International Airport | | |
| Indonesia | Medan | Kualanamu International Airport | Terminated | |
| Indonesia | Palembang | Sultan Mahmud Badaruddin II International Airport | Terminated | |
| Indonesia | Pekanbaru | Sultan Syarif Kasim II International Airport | Terminated | |
| Indonesia | Surabaya | Juanda International Airport | | |
| Japan | Fukuoka | Fukuoka Airport | Terminated | |
| Japan | Okinawa | Naha Airport | | |
| Japan | Osaka | Kansai International Airport | | |
| Malaysia | Kota Kinabalu | Kota Kinabalu International Airport | Terminated | |
| Malaysia | Kuala Lumpur | Kuala Lumpur International Airport | | |
| Malaysia | Kuching | Kuching International Airport | Terminated | |
| Malaysia | Penang | Penang International Airport | Terminated | |
| Myanmar | Yangon | Yangon International Airport | Terminated | |
| New Zealand | Auckland | Auckland Airport | Terminated | |
| Philippines | Clark | Clark International Airport | Terminated | |
| Philippines | Manila | Ninoy Aquino International Airport | | |
| Singapore | Singapore | Changi Airport | Base | |
| Sri Lanka | Colombo | Bandaranaike International Airport | | |
| Taiwan | Taipei | Taoyuan International Airport | Terminated | |
| Thailand | Bangkok | Don Mueang International Airport | Terminated | |
| Thailand | Bangkok | Suvarnabhumi Airport | | |
| Thailand | Hat Yai | Hat Yai International Airport | Terminated | |
| Thailand | Krabi | Krabi International Airport | Terminated | |
| Thailand | Pattaya | U-Tapao International Airport | Terminated | |
| Thailand | Phuket | Phuket International Airport | | |
| Vietnam | Da Nang | Da Nang International Airport | Terminated | |
| Vietnam | Hanoi | Noi Bai International Airport | Terminated | |
| Vietnam | Ho Chi Minh City | Tan Son Nhat International Airport | Terminated | |

== See also ==
- Jetstar destinations
