= Bruce Buchanan =

Bruce Buchanan may refer to:

- Bruce Buchanan (executive), Australian business executive
- Bruce Buchanan (sportscaster) (born 1958 or 1959), Canadian retired sportscaster
