= Orange star =

Orange star may refer to:

- K-type star, a classification of stars with an orange hue
- Orange Star, Singapore-based airline holding company established in 2005
- Orangestar (born 1997), Japanese Vocaloid music producer and composer
- Ornithogalum dubium, a flowering plant native to South Africa

== See also ==
- Orange knobby star, a species of starfish
- Orange sun star, a species of starfish
- Orange Rising Star Award, BAFTA award recognizing new talents in acting established in 2005
- Orange County Blue Star, amateur American soccer team in Irvine, California from 1997 to 2012
