= Rokt =

Technology company based in New York City

- Founded: 2012
- Founder: Bruce Buchanan
- Headquarters: New York City, United States
- Area served: Worldwide
- Website: www.rokt.com

Rokt is an American technology company headquartered in New York City, with offices in London, Seattle, Sydney, Tokyo, and Toronto. In 2020, it reached unicorn status, with a valuation of $3.5 billion as of 2025.

== Overview ==
Rokt is an ecommerce technology company that uses artificial intelligence and machine learning to process billions of transactions to provide relevant products, services and offers on ecommerce websites. Rokt works with a variety of companies, including Macy's, Uber, and Albertsons.

== History ==
Rokt was founded in Sydney, Australia in 2012 by Australian businessman Bruce Buchanan, who helped establish Jetstar Asia and served on the board of directors for Guzman y Gomez. Rokt Pte Ltd then acquired Rocklive, a company founded by former Google senior executive Justin Viles, who later helped launch Rokt with Buchanan. Buchanan is currently the chief executive of Rokt.

Rokt acquired OfferLogic in 2019. In October 2020, Rokt achieved unicorn status and in 2025 reached a valuation of $3.5 billion.

In 2022, Bill Barton, a former Amazon executive, joined Rokt as Director of Product and Engineering to lead the company's research and development efforts and engineering teams.

Rokt acquired Aftersell, an app for Shopify stores to enable upsells, in 2024. In 2025, Rokt acquired mParticle and Canal.

Rokt is a partner of the Red Bull Racing Formula One team and The Female Quotient, founded by Shelley Zalis.

Starting in 2025, Rokt announced that it would be preparing for an initial public offering in 2026.
