= Value Jet =

Value Jet or variations may refer to:

- ValuJet Airlines, an American airline 1992–1997
  - ValuJet Flight 592, a crash on 11 May 1996
- ValueJet (Nigeria), a Nigerian airline since 2018

== See also ==
- Valuair, a Singaporean airline 2004–2014
