= List of Jetstar destinations =

A Jetstar Airways Airbus A321LR at Auckland International Airport, Auckland

Jetstar flies to 21 domestic destinations in Australia and 20 international destinations in 11 countries across Asia and Oceania, not including Jetstar Japan destinations.

The following is a list of destinations Jetstar flies to as part of its scheduled services as of December 2025. Terminated destinations are also listed.

== List ==
Country	City	Airport	Note	Refs
Australia	Adelaide	Adelaide Airport	Base	
Australia	Ayers Rock	Ayers Rock Airport		
Australia	Ballina	Ballina Airport		
Australia	Brisbane	Brisbane Airport	Base	
Australia	Busselton	Busselton Margaret River Airport		
Australia	Cairns	Cairns Airport	Base	
Australia	Canberra	Canberra Airport		
Australia	Darwin	Darwin International Airport		
Australia	Gold Coast	Gold Coast Airport	Base	
Australia	Hamilton Island	Hamilton Island Airport	Terminated	
Australia	Hervey Bay	Hervey Bay Airport		
Australia	Hobart	Hobart Airport		
Australia	Launceston	Launceston Airport		
Australia	Mackay	Mackay Airport		
Australia	Melbourne/Geelong	Avalon Airport		
Australia	Melbourne	Melbourne Airport	Base	
Australia	Newcastle	Newcastle Airport		
Australia	Perth	Perth Airport	Base	
Australia	Proserpine	Whitsunday Coast Airport		
Australia	Rockhampton	Rockhampton Airport	Terminated	
Australia	Sunshine Coast	Sunshine Coast Airport		
Australia	Sydney	Sydney Airport	Base	
Australia	Townsville	Townsville Airport		
China	Beijing	Beijing Capital International Airport	Terminated	
China	Wuhan	Wuhan Tianhe International Airport	Terminated	
China	Zhengzhou	Zhengzhou Xinzheng International Airport	Terminated	
Cook Islands	Rarotonga	Rarotonga International Airport		
Fiji	Nadi	Nadi International Airport		
Indonesia	Denpasar	Ngurah Rai International Airport	Base	
Indonesia	Jakarta	Soekarno–Hatta International Airport	Terminated	
Indonesia	Mataram	Lombok International Airport	Terminated	
Japan	Nagoya	Chubu Centrair International Airport	Terminated	
Japan	Osaka	Kansai International Airport		
Japan	Tokyo	Narita International Airport		
Malaysia	Kuala Lumpur	Kuala Lumpur International Airport	Terminated	
New Zealand	Auckland	Auckland Airport	Base	
New Zealand	Christchurch	Christchurch Airport	Base	
New Zealand	Dunedin	Dunedin Airport		
New Zealand	Hamilton	Hamilton Airport		
New Zealand	Napier	Hawke's Bay Airport	Terminated	
New Zealand	Nelson	Nelson Airport	Terminated	
New Zealand	New Plymouth	New Plymouth Airport	Terminated	
New Zealand	Palmerston North	Palmerston North Airport	Terminated	
New Zealand	Queenstown	Queenstown Airport		
New Zealand	Wellington	Wellington Airport		
Philippines	Cebu	Mactan–Cebu International Airport		
Philippines	Manila	Ninoy Aquino International Airport		
Singapore	Singapore	Changi Airport	Base	
South Korea	Seoul	Incheon International Airport		
Sri Lanka	Colombo	Bandaranaike International Airport		
Thailand	Bangkok	Suvarnabhumi Airport		
Thailand	Phuket	Phuket International Airport		
United States	Honolulu	Daniel K. Inouye International Airport	Terminated	
Vanuatu	Port Vila	Bauerfield International Airport		
Vietnam	Ho Chi Minh City	Tan Son Nhat International Airport		

== See also ==
- List of Jetstar Asia destinations
- List of Jetstar Japan destinations
- List of Qantas destinations
