= Orange Star =

Airline holding company

Orange Star (Chinese: 橘星) is an airline holding company that was formed on 24 July 2005, when Jetstar Asia and Valuair announced their merger in the light of growing competition from other low-cost carriers, price wars and rising fuel costs. Jetstar Asia Chief Executive Officer (CEO) Chong Phit Lian became the CEO of Orange Star. Jetstar Asia employs the Navitaire system, while Valuair uses a Sabre platform. The new company will have a nine-member board, with Qantas CEO Geoff Dixon slated to be chairman.

Like constituent air carriers Jetstar Asia and Valuair, Orange Star is based in Singapore at Singapore Changi Airport.

Qantas is reported to have invested around $30 million (US$18 million) in the venture, and will take a 44.5 per cent stake in Orange Star. Other shareholders will include Temasek Holdings, Tony Chew with 22% in Jetstar Asia and FF Wong with 10% in Jetstar Asia, Singapore Exchange-listed Asiatravel.com and Star Cruises. The latter is a major investor in Valuair.
