= Shelley Zalis =

American gender equity advocate

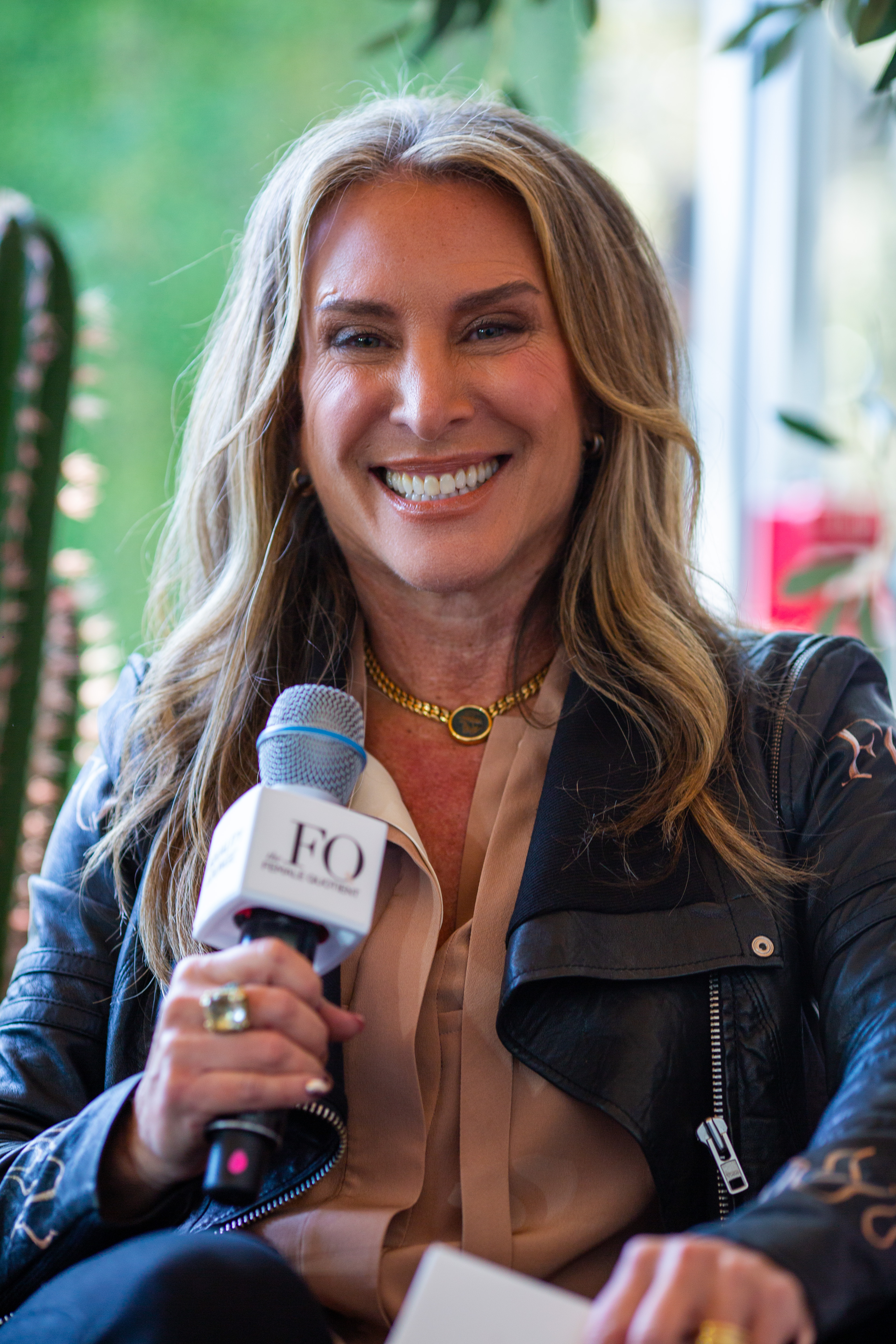
- Zalis at SXSW 2024
- Born: 1962 (age 63–64); Los Angeles, CA
- Education: Barnard College
- Occupations: Gender equality advocate and advisor; Entrepreneur; Qualitative and quantitative media researcher
- Title: CEO and founder, The Female Quotient; Founder, #SeeHer
- Spouse: Philip R. Fleshner (m. 1987)
- Website: https://www.thefemalequotient.com/

Shelley Zalis (born 1962) is an American entrepreneur and gender equity advocate. She is the founder and chief executive officer of The Female Quotient, a Los Angeles-based company that advocates for gender equality in the workplace, and #SeeHer, a global movement to eliminate gender bias in media and advertising.

== Early life and education ==
Zalis was raised in Los Angeles. Her father, Edwin G. Zalis, was a cardiologist. Her mother, Rosalie Zalis, was a political writer and analyst; she was a full-time mother to Zalis and her sisters until they were young adults. She later became a senior policy analyst for California governor Pete Wilson. In 1992, Rosalie Zalis created the first conference for women in business in California.

Zalis briefly attended New York University and in 1980 transferred to Barnard College, Columbia University. A psychology major, she graduated in 1983. Her sisters, Rachel, Lynn, and Charene, also attended Barnard.

== Career ==
=== Video Storyboards, ASI, Nielsen Research ===
Following her graduation, Zalis remained in New York, where she worked at Video Storyboards, a company that tested the effectiveness of advertising animatics, ASI Marketing Research, and Nielsen Reel Research, where in 1998 she created the company's first online surveys and digital research practices. By then she was a mother, and believing that it would be impossible to balance motherhood with employment at a large corporation, she founded her own company.

=== OTX, Ipsos ===
In 2000 Zalis founded the Online Testing Exchange (OTX). She also served as its CEO. Focused on the film industry, in 2003 she was described by the Los Angeles Times as "one of the first to realize the limits of traditional methodology and the potential of the Internet approach for movie research."

OTX used online surveys to gauge consumer reaction to film trailers and television spots. Most of the major film studios became clients of OTX within the first two-and-a-half years of its existence. In 2009 it was one of the largest marketing research companies in the world, and Zalis was one of the only female CEOs in the industry. In 2010 OTX was acquired for $80 million by Ipsos, a marketing firm based in France. Per the terms of the acquisition, Zalis remained at Ipsos for five years as the chief executive of the Ipsos Open Thinking Exchange.

=== The Equality Lounge, The Female Quotient, #SeeHer ===
In 2012 Zalis invited a group of women to join her at CES in Las Vegas, a tech convention "long plagued by gender inequality and practices." More than 50 women showed up at CES, and with Zalis, they walked the convention center floor, gaining significant attention. Zalis said: "That’s when I realized it was the power of the pack. A woman alone has power, collectively we have impact. It's not about leaning in -- it's about standing out."

While at CES, Zalis created the IPSOS Girls Lounge to provide a space for women in business to connect. She subsequently brought the Girls Lounge to business conferences including the World Economic Forum in Davos, Cannes Lions, and South by Southwest. Women were encouraged to network and explore business opportunities. There were no fees to attend the Girls Lounge; Zalis contributed $1 million of her own money and raised $3 million through sponsorships. Although chosen to balance the term "boys club," the use of "girl" rather than "woman" was controversial. As the concept evolved, it was renamed The Equality Lounge, becoming what Zalis described as "a place for conscious leaders, designed by women for everyone."

In 2015, when her five-year commitment to IPSOS ended, Zalis founded The Female Quotient, a Los Angeles-based company that offers live events, online forums, research, media and advisory services to advance gender parity. She has worked with companies including Meta, JP Morgan Chase, NBCUniversal, Deloitte and Visa.

In 2016, Zalis co-founded the non-profit #SeeHer. Established to address gender bias in media and advertising, the organization's first goal of achieving a 20% increase in the accuracy of representa tion of women and girls in late 2018., the 100th anniversary of the passage of the Nineteenth Amendment to the United States Constitution. The initial goal was reached in late 2018, and in 2019, a goal of an 80% decrease in media bias by 2030 was set.

== Recognition ==
Among other awards, Zalis has received the Ernst & Young Entrepreneur of the Year award, the Matrix Award, and the Industry Legend Award from the Advertising Club of New York. She has also appeared on the Adweek Disruptors List. In March 2023 she rang the closing bell at NASDAQ.

Zalis serves on the board of directors for non-profits including the Wharton Future of Advertising, Dress For Success, and ColorComm LLC, a platform addressing diversity and inclusion in marketing and digital industries. She writes about leadership, mentorship, gender parity research and issues related to women in the workplace for Forbes and Time.

== Personal life ==
Zalis and her husband, Phil Fleshner, a surgeon, live in Los Angeles. They have three children.

== Bibliography ==
- Shelley Zalis, "Why maiden names matter in the age of AI and identity", Time, vol. 204, nos. 19-120 (9 December 2024), p. 31. "In the digital age, a name is more than just a label. It's tied to our professional history and social media presence. It's also how we are recognized by AI algorithms."
