= Jetstar Asia =

Low-cost airline of Singapore (2004–2025)

Jetstar Asia Airways

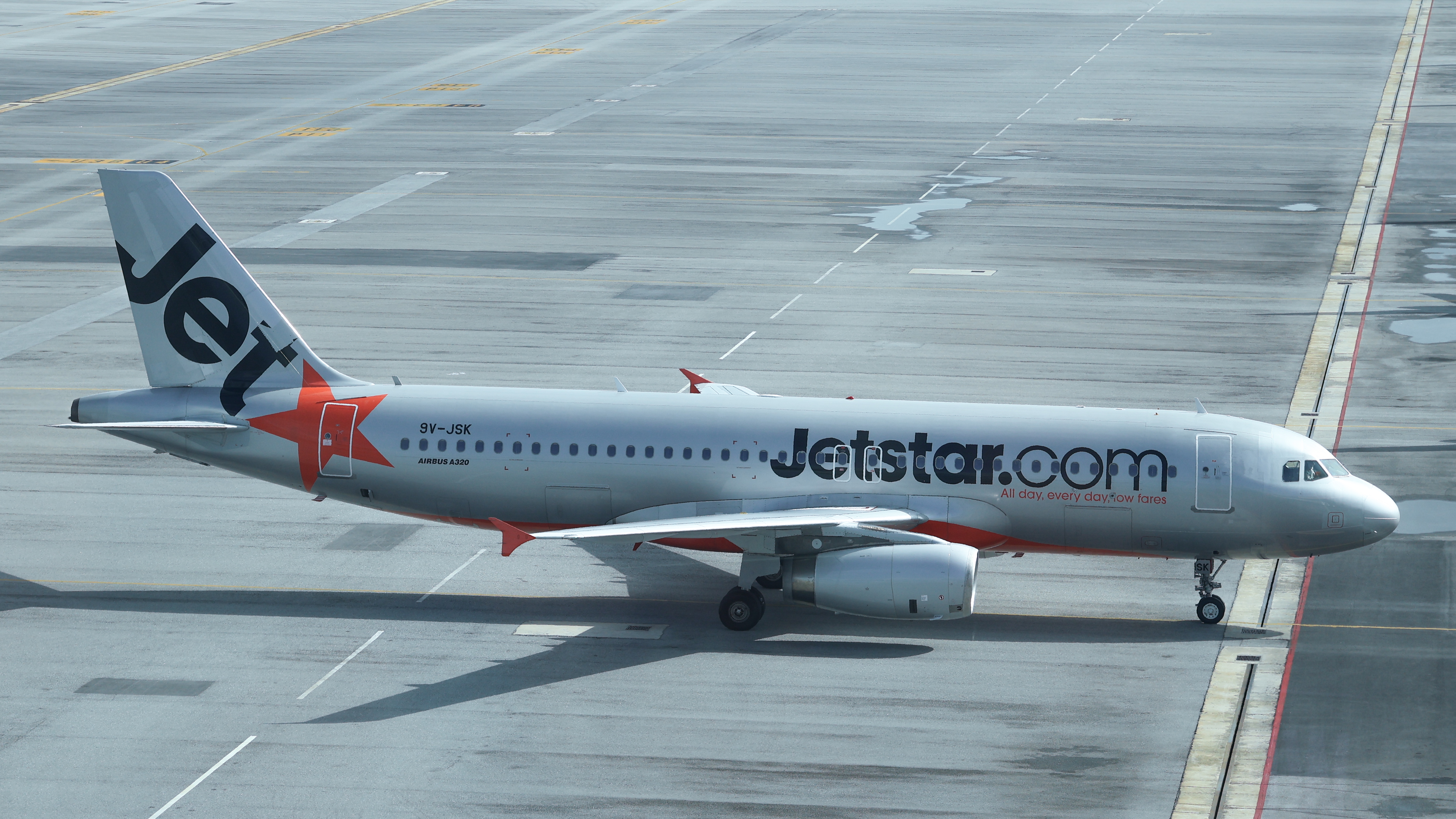
- Jetstar Asia Airbus A320 at Kuala Lumpur International Airport in January 2025
IATA	ICAO	Call sign
3K	JSA	JETSTAR ASIA
- Founded: 19 November 2004
- Commenced operations: 13 December 2004
- Ceased operations: 31 July 2025
- Operating bases: Changi Airport
- Frequent-flyer program: Qantas Frequent Flyer
- Parent company: Westbrook Investments (51%); Qantas (49%)
- Headquarters: Singapore
- Key people: John Simeone (CEO); Dennis Choo (chairman)
- Website: www.jetstar.com.sg

Jetstar Asia was a Singaporean low-cost airline headquartered at Changi Airport. It operated services to regional destinations in Southeast Asia to countries such as Myanmar, Cambodia, Malaysia, Indonesia, Philippines, Thailand and Vietnam. It also flew regional routes in East Asia such as to Japan, Taiwan and Hong Kong.

Established in 2004, the airline served as the primary feeder carrier for its parent company, Jetstar, transporting passengers into Australia. It was one of Jetstar's Asian affiliates, alongside Jetstar Japan, and operated a fleet of Airbus A320 aircraft as a low-cost subsidiary of Qantas. It ceased operations on 31 July 2025.

== History ==
Jetstar Asia was launched in 2004 as a partnership between Qantas (49% stake), Singaporean businessmen Tony Chew (22%) and FF Wong (10%) and Temasek Holdings (19%). It received its Air Operator's Certificate from the Singapore government on 19 November 2004.

Due to its belated entry into the market, the airline differentiated itself from its competitors by flying further; anywhere within a five hour radius from Singapore while its competitors flew to destinations within a 4-hour radius from Singapore. The airline announced seven routes to Shanghai, Hong Kong, Taipei, Pattaya, Jakarta, Surabaya and Manila; the most ambitious start-up plan compared to any of its Asian rivals, which would have given it the widest international coverage.

Online ticketing commenced at 0800 hours (8GMT) on 7 December 2004, a day after the first three routings and their promotional prices were announced, namely S$48 (HK$228) to Hong Kong, S$88 (NT1788) to Taipei and S$28 (Bht725) to Pattaya on a one-way ticket for all seats in the first week of operations as each routing was launched. Flights to Manila began in 2005.

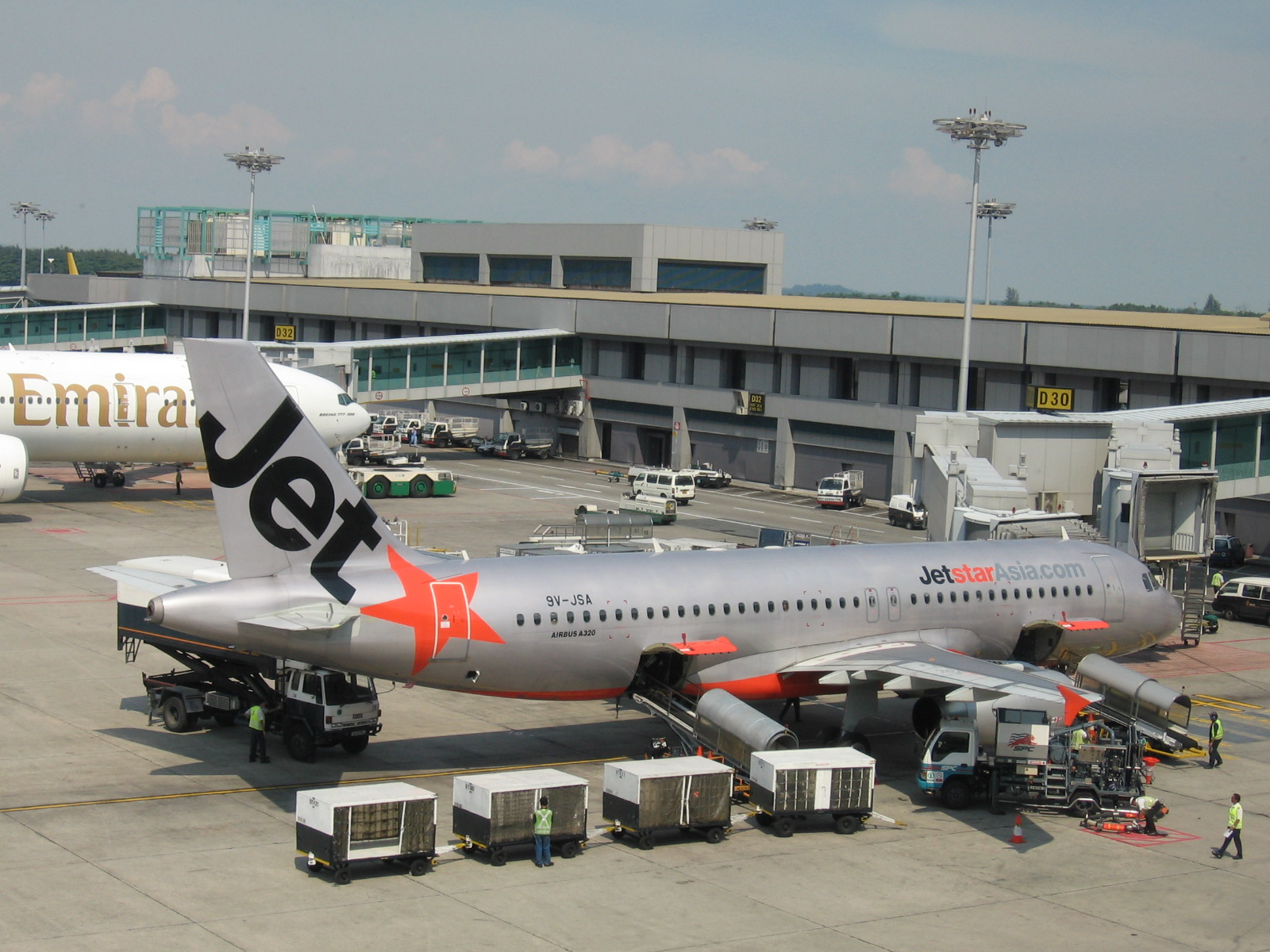
A Jetstar Asia Airbus A320 at Changi Airport in December 2005

However, services to certain announced destinations (Shanghai, Jakarta and Surabaya) could not be started. The delay of flights to Shanghai was because China's aviation authority did not allow foreign budget airlines flying to both Shanghai and Beijing airports. Flights to Indonesia were also not allowed as Indonesia's government embarked a policy of protectionism for its own low-budget airlines. Existing flights by low-fare airlines, such as Valuair's flights to Jakarta and Denpasar as well as Tiger Airways' service to Padang, were not revoked.

Despite facing a difficult market, Jetstar Asia took delivery of a fifth aircraft in 2005 and sought approval for new routes. Jetstar planned to lease the aircraft from Atlasjet Airways, but the aircraft was later withdrawn from the lease arrangement. Discussions were held with Qantas to source additional aircraft. In 2005, the budget carrier began seeking approval from Cambodian authorities to fly to Phnom Penh and Siem Reap, and was eventually granted rights.

Hot on the heels of Tiger Airways' success on the Phuket route, Jetstar Asia announced 4 times weekly flights to Phuket. The flight commenced on 25 October 2005, however due to inconsistent demand and better opportunities elsewhere, Jetstar announced the suspension of flights to Phuket on 27 March 2008.

By the end of December, it was clear that Jetstar Asia was bleeding cash and its investors were struggling to finance the airline. On 2 December 2005, Jetstar Asia announced that its chief executive officer (CEO), Ken Ryan, was stepping down to return to Australia. Mr Ryan would take on a new management role at Orange Star's majority shareholder Qantas and was replaced at the helm by Neil Thompson. On 9 February 2006, Jetstar Asia appointed Singaporean Chong Phit Lian as the airline's new CEO, replacing interim CEO Neil Thompson.

On 26 July 2006, Qantas decided to re-position both of its Jetstar ventures in Australia and Singapore as a single brand. This was followed by a launch of Jetstar's long-haul operations to six destinations in South-east Asia from Australia.

On 15 September 2006, Jetstar Asia became the first international airline to land at Bangkok's Suvarnabhumi Airport.

On 16 April 2008, Jetstar Asia announced that it had reported a profit ahead of schedule, and ahead of local rival Tiger Airways. Both Jetstar Asia and sister airline Valuair saw a 20% increase in revenue, a 4% rise in passenger load and an overall 20% jump in passenger carriage for the year ending March 2008. The airline's CEO attributes its success to better brand awareness as well as an increased utilisation of aircraft, growing revenue and a broadening of the earning base. Bruce Buchanan (co-founder of Rokt) was CEO of Jetstar from 2008 until he stepped down in 2012.

On 16 April 2008, the company announced that it had achieved profitability for the year ended 31 March 2008, with an increase of 20% in the number of passengers carried and a passenger load factor of over 75%, an increase of 4% over the previous year. Jetstar Asia carried 2.7 million passengers during the year to 30 June 2011, an increase of 18% on the previous year, and saw revenue passenger kilometres increase by 39.7%, as long-haul flights from Singapore to Auckland and Melbourne using Airbus A330 aircraft were launched.

In March 2011, Jetstar launched flights to Hangzhou, China. In 2015, the airline added Palembang, Pekanbaru and Da Nang.

In November 2017, the airline added Clark, Hat Yai and Okinawa. The airline announced its first destination in South Asia, Colombo, in 2020. However, the launch was delayed due to the coronavirus pandemic.

In response to the COVID-19 pandemic on 17 March 2020, Jetstar Asia announced that it would suspend all flights between 23 March and 15 April, grounding all their planes and asking their staff to take leave. This suspension was extended first until 18 May and then until 31 May. On 21 April 2020, Jetstar Asia announced that it would start some flights but mainly to repatriate citizens and permanent residents to Malaysia, Philippines, Singapore and Thailand. On 25 June, the airline announced that it was cutting up to 180 people, almost a quarter of the workforce in Singapore. At the same time they would allow the retirement of five of their A320 fleet, bringing the total down to 13.

On 11 June 2025, Qantas announced Jetstar Asia would cease operations on 31 July 2025. The seven weeks between the announcement and closure will allow the group to slowly scale back its operation on the airlines' 16 routes. The airlines 13 Airbus A320 aircraft were redeployed to Jetstar in Australia and New Zealand as well as QantasLink's routes in Western Australia. Qantas attributed the closure to rising supplier costs, high airport fees, and intensified competition in the region, following a $35 million loss this financial year. The National Trades Union Congress would support over 500 airline employees retrenched as a result of the closure, and also seek to provide employment opportunities in similar roles with Singapore Airlines, and new Qantas International crew base.

== Merger with Valuair ==
Jetstar Asia and Valuair, another Singapore-based airline, merged on 24 July 2005, in the first major consolidation of Southeast Asia's crowded and competitive low-cost airline industry. The airlines released a joint statement saying they would continue to operate their normal routes under their own brands in the meantime, with little or no change to the service offered by either airline. Qantas CEO and Jetstar Asia chairman Geoff Dixon chaired the new company. Jetstar Asia CEO Chong Phit Lian was appointed as the chief executive of both airlines. The new company was due to receive a cash injection of more than S$50 million, largely to be provided by Qantas. Shareholders of Valuair, including airline-industry veteran Lim Chin Beng, Malaysia's Star Cruises and Asiatravel.com, have now become minority shareholders in the merged company, Orange Star. Qantas owns 42.5% of both airlines after the merger.

In October 2014, following the Indonesian government lifting operational restrictions on foreign-owned low-cost carriers into Indonesia, Valuair was dissolved and its flights were taken over by Jetstar Asia on 26 October 2014.

== Management changes ==
In December 2011, the airline announced that CEO Chong Phit Lian was to step down from 1 February 2012 after leading the airline for six years, to pursue opportunities outside the aviation sector. Chong remained a member of the Jetstar Asia board. Paul Daff, formerly head of Jetconnect, the Qantas Group subsidiary airline in New Zealand and previously Head of Commercial for Jetstar Asia, acted as interim CEO while a successor was recruited.

In March 2012, it was announced that Barathan Pasupathi, former CFO of Jetstar Asia, had been appointed as CEO to take effect from 2 July 2012. He resigned the post effective 1 March 2024, and John Simeone was appointed as the new CEO.

== Ownership structure ==
Newstar Holdings was the holding company that operated and managed Jetstar in Singapore. Westbrook Investments owned 51% and Qantas 49%.

== Destinations ==
=== Codeshare agreements ===
Jetstar Asia had codeshare agreements with the following airlines:

- Air France
- American Airlines
- Emirates
- Finnair
- Japan Airlines
- KLM
- Qantas
- SriLankan Airlines

=== Interline agreements ===
In addition to the above codeshare arrangements, Jetstar Asia also had interline arrangements with the following airlines:

- Air Canada
- British Airways
- China Eastern Airlines
- China Southern Airlines
- Fiji Airways
- Hahn Air
- IndiGo
- Qatar Airways
- Singapore Airlines
- Turkish Airlines

== Final fleet ==
Before ceasing operations, Jetstar Asia operated the following aircraft:

Jetstar Asia fleet
Aircraft	In service	Passengers	Notes
Airbus A320-200	13	180	All transferred to Jetstar and QantasLink.
Total	13		

== In-flight ==
=== Seating ===
Jetstar Asia's Airbus A320 aircraft provided a single-class economy seating configuration with a capacity of 180 seats. Seats were 17.88 in (45.4 cm) in width with a seat pitch of 29 in (73.7 cm). Passengers had the option to select their preferred seat for an additional fee.

=== Food and beverage ===
Passengers could purchase food and beverages on board from the Jetstar Café menu. Menus varied depending on flight length and destination. Charges can only be to credit cards, with cash payments suspended since December 2020 to reduce contact between passengers and crew.

For passengers who added a Plus, Max, or Flexibiz bundle to the Starter fare, a meal, or in-flight voucher were included, depending on the flight. In-flight vouchers could be used to purchase duty-free items from Jetshop.
