= Valuair =

Low-cost airline of Singapore (2004–2014)

IATA	ICAO	Call sign
VF	VLU	VALUAIR
- Founded: 5 May 2004
- Ceased operations: 26 October 2014 (merged into Jetstar Asia)
- Operating bases: Changi Airport
- Parent company: Westbrook Investments
- Headquarters: Southwest Finger, Level 3, Terminal 1, Changi Airport
- Key people: Barathan Pasupathi (CEO)
- Website: valuair.com.sg

Valuair (Chinese: 惠旅航空) was a Singapore-based low-cost carrier. It was launched on 5 May 2004, initially offering services to Bangkok and Hong Kong, before expanding to Indonesia, Mainland China and other cities in Thailand. It differentiated itself from other low-cost carriers by offering frills such as a baggage allowance of 20 kg, in-flight food, and a large seat pitch. Acquired on 24 July 2005 by Jetstar Asia, an Australian airline, the Valuair brand was retained for Jetstar Asia's scheduled services to major cities in Indonesia until 26 October 2014.

The Southwest Finger of Level 3 of Terminal 1 at Changi Airport housed the head office of the airline.

== History ==
Valuair was the first low-cost airline to begin operations in Singapore, although some do not consider it as such by other definitions. Launching its first flight on 5 May 2004, it was funded by local businessmen, and had the expertise of an ex-Singapore Airlines employee as its chief executive.

Valuair sought to differentiate itself from its competitors such as then-rival Jetstar Asia and Tiger Airways by offering free hot meals, wider legroom and assigned seating, and marketed itself as a low-fare airline. The airline flew beyond the traditional five-hour radius typical of low-cost carriers and flew to destinations like Perth, Xiamen and Chengdu. The airline even had ambitious plans flying to Australia's East Coast and Northeast Asia using wide-body aircraft. In its plans, a Business Class and cargo operations was even thought of. However, rising fuel prices, along with lack of financial backing and the deep pockets of Qantas' Jetstar Asia and Singapore Airlines-backed Tiger Airways finally forced the airline to concede defeat in the highly-competitive local scene.

On 24 July 2005, the carrier announced plans to merge with Jetstar Asia. Both Jetstar Asia, a Qantas-backed airline, and Valuair were planning to operate their respective routes normally for the foreseeable future. The announcement came after several weeks of speculation about consolidation within Southeast Asia's low-cost airline industry.

=== Valuair and Jetstar Asia merger ===
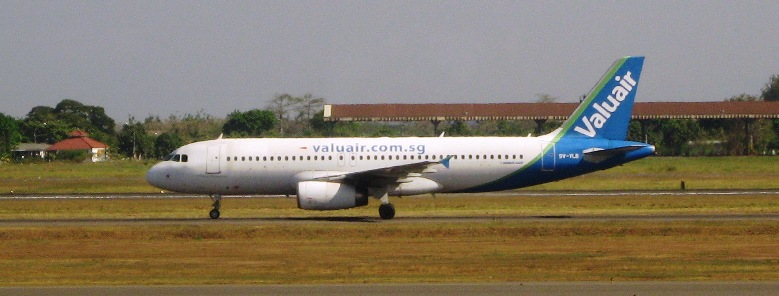
Valuair Airbus A320 at Juanda International Airport, Surabaya

On 24 July 2005, Jetstar Asia and Valuair merged to form Orange Star, in the first major consolidation of Southeast Asia's crowded low-cost airline industry. Jetstar Asia and Valuair said they would continue to operate their normal routes under their own brands in the meantime, with little or no change to the service offered by either airline. Qantas chief executive officer and Jetstar Asia chairman Geoff Dixon chaired the new company. Jetstar Asia chief executive officer Chong Phit Lian was appointed as the chief executive of both airlines. The new company was to receive a cash injection of more than S$50 million in fresh capital into the new entity, largely to be provided by Qantas. Shareholders of Valuair, including airline industry veteran Lim Chin Beng, Malaysia's Star Cruises and Asiatravel.com, have now become minority shareholders in the merged company.

From 11 September 2005, Valuair began flying twice daily from Singapore to Jakarta. The new daily flight began as VF208 from Singapore to Jakarta, and VF207 from Jakarta to Singapore. As of 1 February 2008, flights to Jakarta increased to four times daily. From 23 October 2005, Valuair commenced daily flights from Singapore to Surabaya, VF531 operated from Singapore to Surabaya, and VF532 vice versa. Flights to Hong Kong were suspended.

From 26 January 2006, Valuair commenced three weekly flights from Singapore to Denpasar Bali. As at 1 February 2008, the service has been upgraded to become four times per week.

=== Post-merger ===
Until 2014, the airline flew exclusively to Indonesian destinations - namely Jakarta, Medan, Surabaya and Denpasar. In an attempt to protect local airlines, in 2005 Indonesia introduced a new policy preventing foreign low-cost carriers from flying to major airports within the country. Jetstar Asia had not yet established routes into Indonesia, so the merger was seen as the airline's strategy to get an early entrance into the lucrative Indonesian market.

Valuair flights are operated by Jetstar Asia crew, with the in-flight menu and entertainment virtually the same as Jetstar Asia's. Some Jetstar flights are flown using Valuair aircraft.

In February 2008, Jetstar Asia announced that it would begin flights to Medan later in the year. As existing protectionism policies are in place, the flights were operated under Valuair's code.

Jetstar Asia is a majority Singapore-owned and -based company. The company is managed by Newstar Holdings Pty Ltd, majority owned by Singapore company Westbrook Investments Pte Ltd (51 per cent), with the Qantas Group holding the remaining 49 per cent of shares.

In October 2014, after the Indonesian Government lifting operational restrictions on foreign-owned low-cost carriers into Indonesia, Valuair was dissolved and its flights were taken over by Jetstar Asia on 26 October 2014.

== Destinations ==
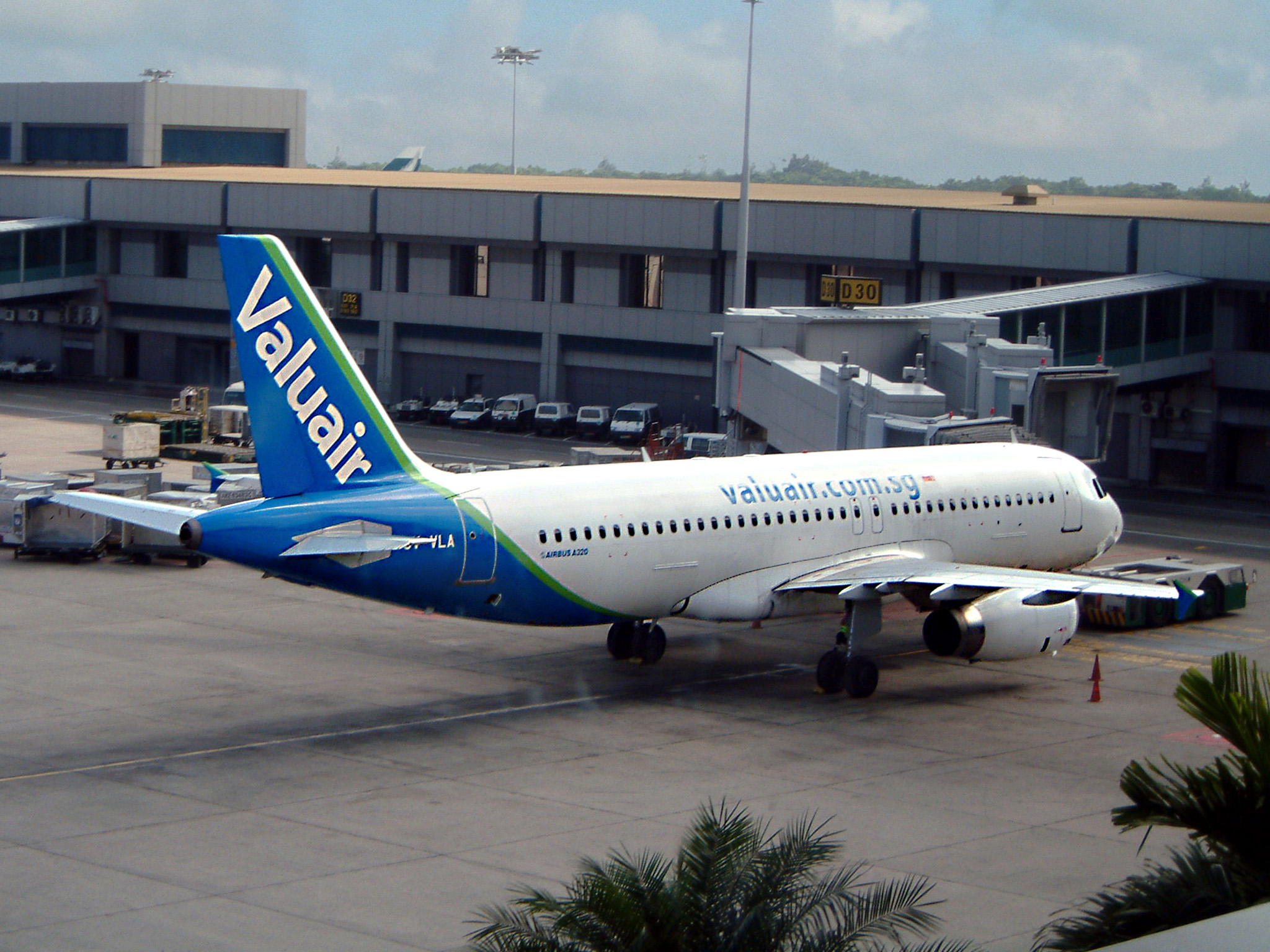
A Valuair Airbus A320 at Singapore Changi Airport Terminal 1

Valuair offered flights between its base in Singapore to Jakarta, Denpasar and Surabaya, with Bangkok as a codeshare with Jetstar Asia. After the merger with Jetstar Asia, the airline cut routes to Perth, Hong Kong, Xiamen, Chengdu and Bangkok, as part of a consolidation exercise between both airlines. The last flight under the Valuair brand landed on 25 October 2014, and all flights thereafter were operated under the Jetstar Asia brand.

The following list shows the former destinations, including the city served, the country, the airport, and the begin and end year of the service.

Country	City	Airport	Begin	End
Australia	Perth	Perth Airport	1 December 2004	9 October 2005
China	Chengdu	Chengdu Shuangliu International Airport	20 April 2005	30 October 2005
China	Xiamen	Xiamen Gaoqi International Airport	25 April 2005	30 October 2005
Hong Kong	Hong Kong	Hong Kong International Airport	7 May 2004	23 October 2005
Indonesia	Denpasar	Ngurah Rai International Airport	27 January 2006	26 October 2014
Indonesia	Jakarta	Soekarno-Hatta International Airport	23 October 2005	26 October 2014
Indonesia	Medan	Kualanamu International Airport	25 July 2013	26 October 2014
Indonesia	Medan	Polonia International Airport	30 March 2008	2013
Indonesia	Surabaya	Juanda International Airport	23 October 2005	26 October 2014
Singapore	Singapore	Changi Airport (base)	5 May 2004	26 October 2014
Thailand	Bangkok	Don Mueang International Airport	5 May 2004	November 2005

== In-flight services ==
Passengers would purchase food and beverage on board from the cabin crew as part of a buy on board programme. On flights operated by Valuair, passengers were only allowed to consume food and drinks purchased onboard unless they had special dietary needs. Prior to merger, meal and drinks were included in the ticket charge.
