= Jetstar =

Low-cost airline of Australia

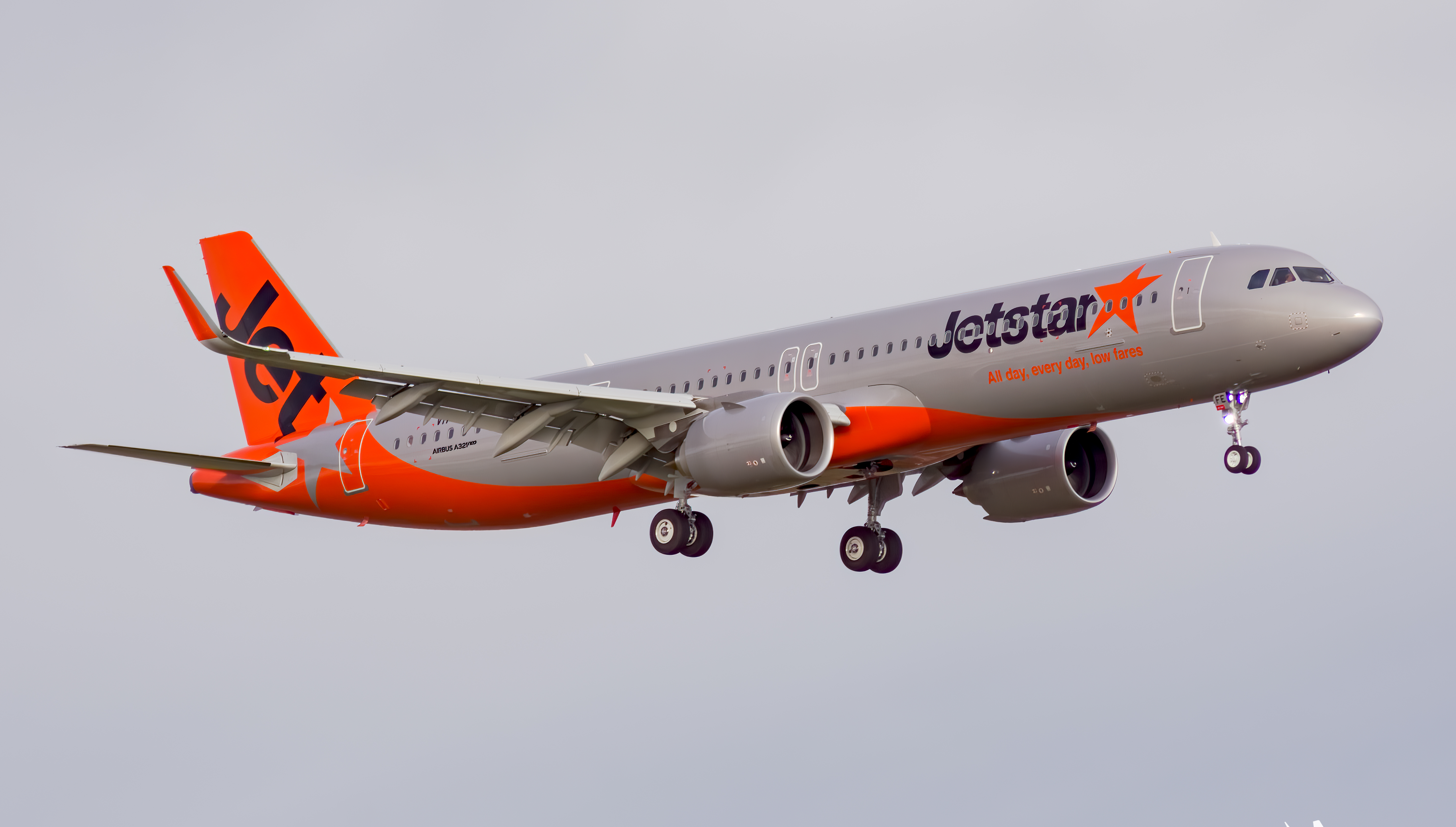
- Jetstar Airbus A321neo
IATA	ICAO	Call sign
JQ	JST	JETSTAR
- Founded: 2003; 23 years ago
- Commenced operations: 25 May 2004; 22 years ago
- AOC #: CASA.AOC.0005
- Operating bases: Adelaide; Auckland; Brisbane; Cairns; Christchurch; Denpasar; Gold Coast; Melbourne; Perth; Sydney
- Frequent-flyer program: Qantas Frequent Flyer
- Fleet size: 103
- Destinations: 40
- Parent company: Qantas
- Headquarters: Melbourne, Victoria, Australia
- Key people: Stephanie Tully (CEO)
- Revenue: ▲ A$5.711 billion (2024/2025) (Note: The Jetstar financial results include Jetstar Airways, Jetstar Asia Airways and Valuair as consolidated entities in the Qantas Group accounts. Despite Qantas owning only a minority stake in Jetstar Asia Airways and Valuair (51% owned and effectively controlled by Singaporean nationals as required under Singapore aviation regulations), Australian accounting standards have required them to be treated as consolidated entities since 8 April 2009. Jetstar Pacific Airlines and Jetstar Japan are treated as investments in associates and not consolidated in the Qantas Group accounts.)
- Operating income: ▲ A$769 million (2024/2025)
- Website: www.jetstar.com

Jetstar Airways Pty Ltd, trading as Jetstar, is an Australian low-cost airline headquartered in Melbourne, Victoria. It is a wholly owned subsidiary of Qantas, created in response to the threat posed by the airline Virgin Blue (now known as Virgin Australia). Jetstar is part of Qantas' two-brand strategy of having Qantas Airways for the premium full-service market and Jetstar for the low-cost market. As of June 2015, Jetstar carried 8.5% of all passengers travelling in and out of Australia.

The airline operates an extensive domestic network as well as regional and international services from its main base at Melbourne Airport, using a mixed fleet consisting of Airbus A320 family and Boeing 787 Dreamliner aircraft. Like its Qantas parent, Jetstar competes with Virgin Australia. Qantas, through the Jetstar Group, also has stake in the airline Jetstar Japan.

== History ==
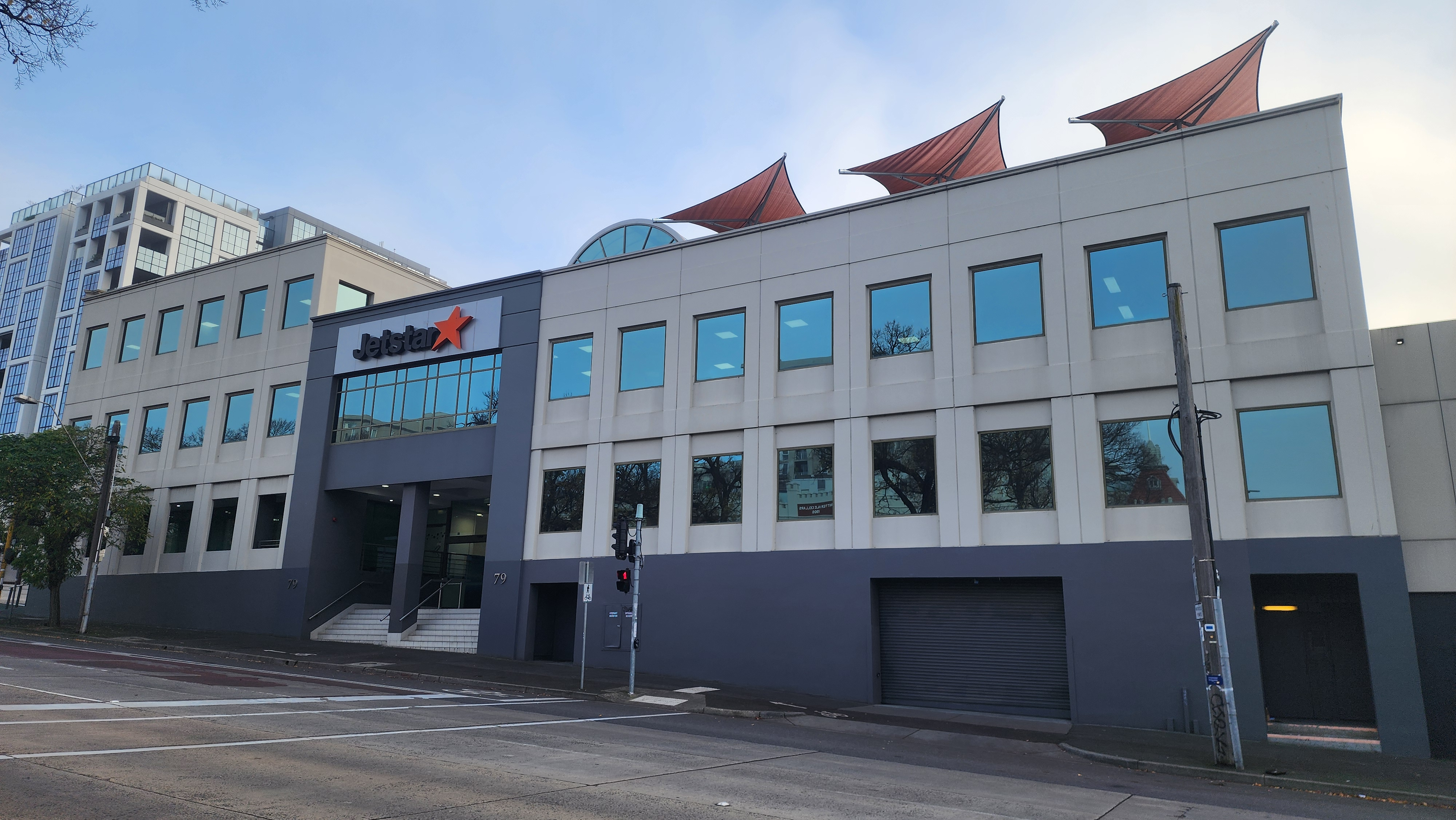
Jetstar's head office in Collingwood

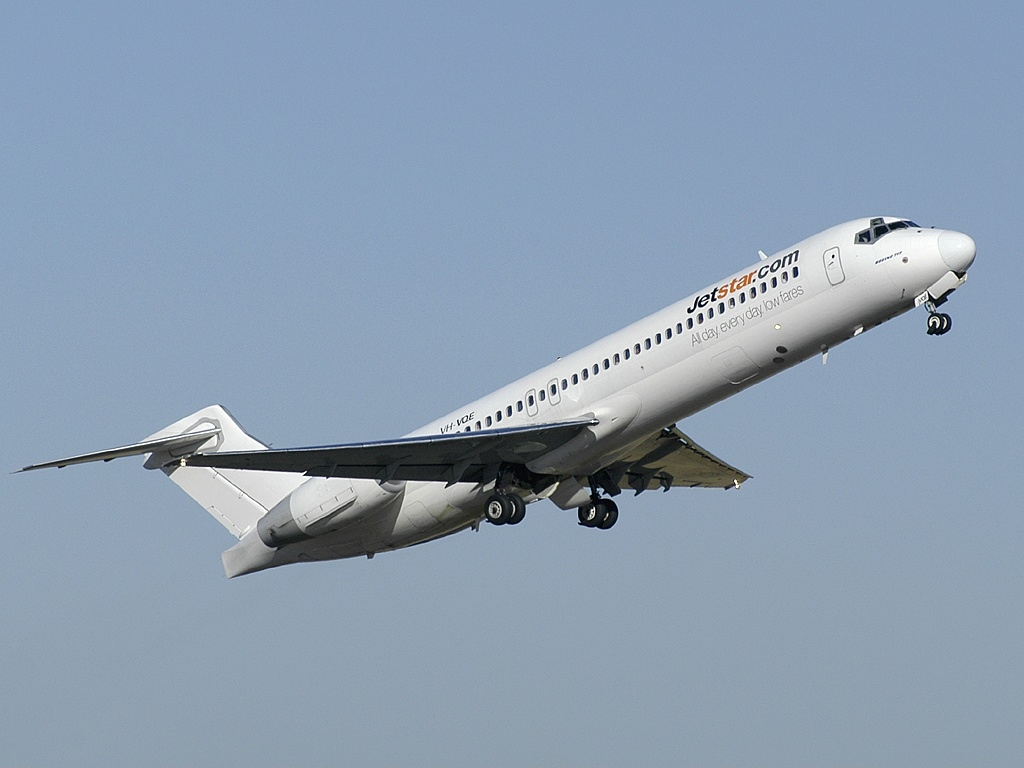
A former Jetstar Boeing 717-200 in an earlier livery version (2004)

=== Foundation and early years ===
The airline was established by Qantas in 2001 as a low-cost domestic subsidiary. Qantas had previously acquired Impulse Airlines on 20 November 2001 and operated it under the QantasLink brand, but following the decision to launch a low-cost carrier, re-launched the airline under the Jetstar brand. Domestic passenger services began on 25 May 2004, soon after the sale of tickets for its inaugural flight in February 2004. International services to Christchurch, New Zealand commenced on 1 December 2005. Although owned by Qantas, its management operates largely independently of Qantas through the company formerly known as Impulse Airlines.

Originally the airline was headquartered on the grounds of Avalon Airport near Melbourne, and started flying out of Avalon Airport in mid 2004, but later relocated its registered office to the suburb of Collingwood, Victoria, near the Melbourne central business district.

Reserved seating is provided on all routes, and on 4 October 2006, Jetstar became the first Australian airline to allow customers to select their seat upon booking. Sister airline Jetstar Asia Airways took off from its Singapore hub to Hong Kong on 13 December 2004, Qantas' entry into the Asian low-cost market to compete with Singapore Airlines on its home ground. Qantas had a 49% stake in Jetstar Asia's ownership. Jetstar Asia closed in 2025.

On 1 December 2005, Jetstar commenced operations from Sydney, Melbourne, Brisbane and the Gold Coast to Christchurch in New Zealand. On 7 December 2005, it was announced that Jetstar would establish the world's first global low-cost airline. At the end of 2005, it was announced that Jetstar would fly to Perth from Avalon Airport.

In July 2006, Jetstar and Jetstar Asia were brought together under the "Jetstar" brand. Online bookings for both carriers were integrated into Jetstar.com.

In July 2007, Qantas acquired an 18% stake in Vietnam's Pacific Airlines, to increase to 30% by 2010. The airline was relaunched on 23 May 2008 as Jetstar Pacific.

In 2008, Jetstar signed an agreement with the Northern Territory Government to make Darwin International Airport an international hub with seven aircraft based there, with A$8 million from the Northern Territory Government. The Darwin base was closed in May 2014, with aircraft repositioned to Adelaide. Flights to Tokyo via Manila were discontinued, and services to Singapore were henceforth operated by Jetstar Asia with Singapore-based aircraft. The base closure was attributed to cost-cutting by parent Qantas and increased competition from the re-introduction Asian carriers' flights into Darwin Airport.

In 2009, Jetstar commenced daily Airbus A320 direct services from Auckland to the Gold Coast and Sydney, and domestic New Zealand flights between Auckland, Wellington, Christchurch, and Queenstown, followed by services to Dunedin. Jetstar replaced Qantas subsidiary Jetconnect on these routes.

=== Developments since 2010 ===
From 1 February 2011, Jetstar started its co-operation with the oneworld alliance, allowing people booking an itinerary with a full oneworld member to include a Jetstar flight in the itinerary. However, the flight must be sold via Jetstar's corporate parent Qantas, under a QF flight number.

In August 2011, Jetstar's parent Qantas announced that it would set up a new airline to be called Jetstar Japan, a joint venture of Jetstar, Japan Airlines, and Mitsubishi. The airline was expected to start operating in December 2012, but then launched ahead of schedule on 3 July 2012.

In March 2012, another Asian Jetstar branded airline was announced, Jetstar Hong Kong, a strategic partnership between Qantas and China Eastern Airlines, which was expected to commence operations in 2013. Although it took delivery of aircraft, Jetstar Hong Kong never commenced operations due to a revoked licence application.

In November 2013, Jetstar moved its head office from Melbourne's CBD to the suburb of Collingwood. In February 2014, Jetstar signed a codeshare agreement with the airline Emirates as a continuation of the agreement between Emirates and Qantas, Jetstar's parent airline.

In mid 2014, the Australian Competition & Consumer Commission (ACCC) took legal action against Jetstar and competitor Virgin Australia in respect of drip pricing. In November 2015, the Federal Court of Australia found that the ACCC's claims that the two airlines engaged in misleading and deceptive conduct by carrying out drip pricing were proven. In September 2022, Stephanie Tully was appointed as the new CEO of Jetstar.

=== New Zealand operations ===
Currently, the airline operates domestic and short-haul international services to Auckland, Christchurch, Queenstown, and Wellington, Dunedin and international services to Hamilton, using their fleet of Airbus A320 family aircraft.

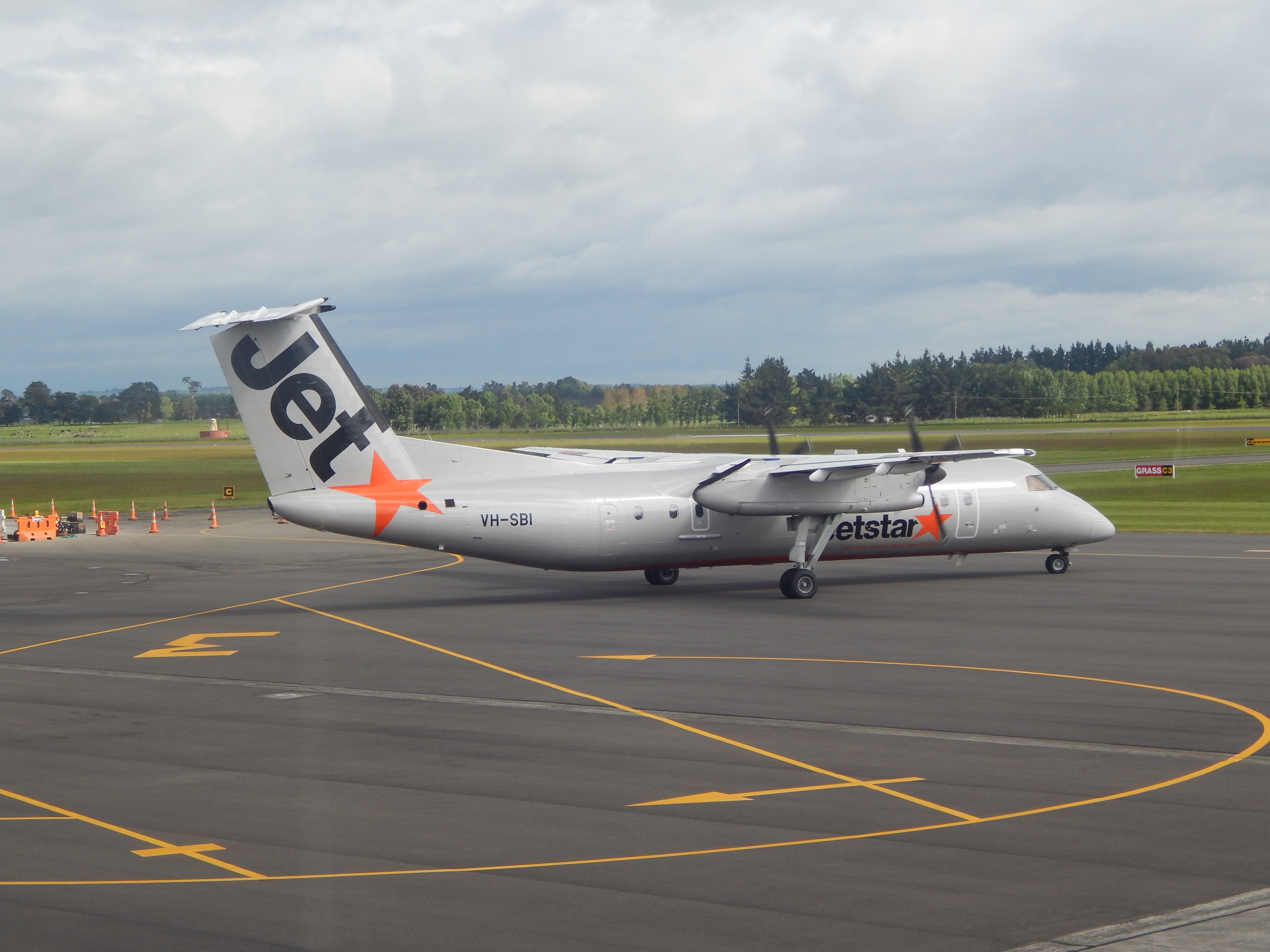
A former Jetstar De Havilland Canada Dash 8-300 at Palmerston North Airport

In June 2015, Jetstar announced that it would commence regional services in New Zealand, beginning in December 2015. The new services would be flown by five turboprop Bombardier Dash 8s operated by Eastern Australia Airlines — one of Qantas' subsidiary regional airlines — under the Jetstar brand. At least four new destinations would be served initially, with Hamilton, Rotorua, New Plymouth, Napier, Palmerston North, Nelson and Invercargill named as the cities under consideration. On 31 August 2015, Jetstar announced it had selected the first four regional centres it would serve at the commencement of operations on 1 December; these were Napier, Nelson, New Plymouth, and Palmerston North. All four cities had services to Auckland; Nelson also had services to Wellington.

Jetstar announced in November 2019 that they would be ceasing all of their regional routes in New Zealand because the routes were loss-making.

In mid March 2020, Jetstar suspended their New Zealand operations in response to the global COVID-19 pandemic. On 15 August, Jetstar suspended its domestic operations in New Zealand after the Government implemented social distancing rules in response to a second outbreak in Auckland that month. The airline attracted criticism after it refused to offer cash refunds to passengers whose flights were affected by the cancellation, instead offering travel vouchers or to change dates.

In mid September 2020, Jetstar announced that it was resuming domestic flights in New Zealand after the New Zealand Government eliminated physical distancing requirements on aircraft.

In late May 2024, Jetstar Flight JQ225 slid off the runway at Christchurch Airport, after suffering steering issues caused by a possible hydraulic leak. The Civil Aviation Authority commenced an investigation into the incident.

On 21 August 2025, Jetstar admitted to 20 charges of breaching the Fair Trading Act 1986 by misleading customers about compensation at the Auckland District Court. The airline faces a potential fine of NZ$1.5 million. Jetstar had already paid NZ$1 million in refunds to customers and had donated NZ$860,000 to a children's charity. On 1 September 2025, Judge Brooke Gibson of the Auckland District Court imposed a record fine of NZ$2.25 million on Jetstar NZ, which 1News described as one of the biggest penalties imposed under the Fair Trading Act. By that time, over 2,700 Jetstar passengers had been compensated over NZ$1 million for flight cancellations and delays between 2022 and 2023.

== Corporate affairs ==
=== Business figures ===
The key trends for the Jetstar Group are (as of the financial year ending 30 June):

	Revenue (A$ m)	EBIT (Note: "Underlying EBIT") (A$ m)	Passenger load factor (Note: "Seat factor") (%)	Fleet size	References
2012	3,076	203	79.2		
2013	3,288	138	79.1		
2014	3,222	−116	77.9		
2015	3,464	230	79.9		
2016	3,636	452	81.5		
2017	3,600	417	83.1	95	
2018	3,795	457	85.6	93	
2019	3,961	400	86.1	94	
2020	3,006	−26	84.3	87	
2021	1,140	−541	71.3	78	
2022	1,440	−796	71.2	76	
2023	4,235	404	86.4	81	
2024	4,922	497	86.8	86	
2025	5,711	769	88.3	97	

=== Marketing ===
From 2004 to 2006, the airline's mascot, Julie The Jetstar Girl, was played by actress Magda Szubanski. The advertising slogan of Jetstar is "All day every day low fares". In 2006, the jingle "Let's Fly Jetstar tonight" and the use of Szubanski ceased and was replaced with "It's All About Choice / Fly Away" (later "Low Fares, Good Time").

==== Television series ====
The Nine Network began airing the series Going Places from October 2007. The eight-part series depicted the everyday lives of selected members of Jetstar's Melbourne airport staff. The show followed the dramas of the check-in staff mid-flight, and new international recruits.

=== Sponsorship ===
Jetstar Airways was the major sponsor of the National Rugby League team, the Gold Coast Titans from 2008 until 2012. In July 2008, Jetstar Airways was named the Official Airline of the Australian national rugby league team. One of its Airbus A320s was decorated with special decals to advertise the relationship.

== Destinations ==
Countries served by Jetstar as of April 2025

=== Codeshare agreements ===
As of January 2024, Jetstar Airways has codeshare agreements with the following airlines:

- American Airlines
- Emirates
- Fiji Airways
- Finnair
- IndiGo
- Japan Airlines
- Jeju Air
- Jin Air
- KLM
- LATAM Chile
- Qantas

=== Interline agreements ===
Jetstar Airways has interline agreements with the following airline:

- IndiGo

== Fleet ==
=== Current fleet ===
As of May 2026, Jetstar operates the following aircraft:

Jetstar Airways fleet
Aircraft	In service	Orders	Passengers			Notes
Aircraft	In service	Orders	J	Y	Total	Notes
Airbus A320-200	52	—	—	180	180	
Airbus A320-200	52	—	—	186	186	
Airbus A320neo	6	7	—	188	188	Deliveries began November 2024.
Airbus A321-200	6	—	—	230	230	
Airbus A321LR	25	—	—	232	232	
Airbus A321XLR	—	12	TBA			Deliveries begin in 2027. To be fitted with a two class configuration.
Boeing 787-8	10	—	21	314	335	To be retrofitted from February 2026. First Australian operator of the Boeing 787 Dreamliner.
Boeing 787-8	1	—	44	281	325	To be retrofitted from February 2026. First Australian operator of the Boeing 787 Dreamliner.
Total	100	19				

=== Fleet development ===
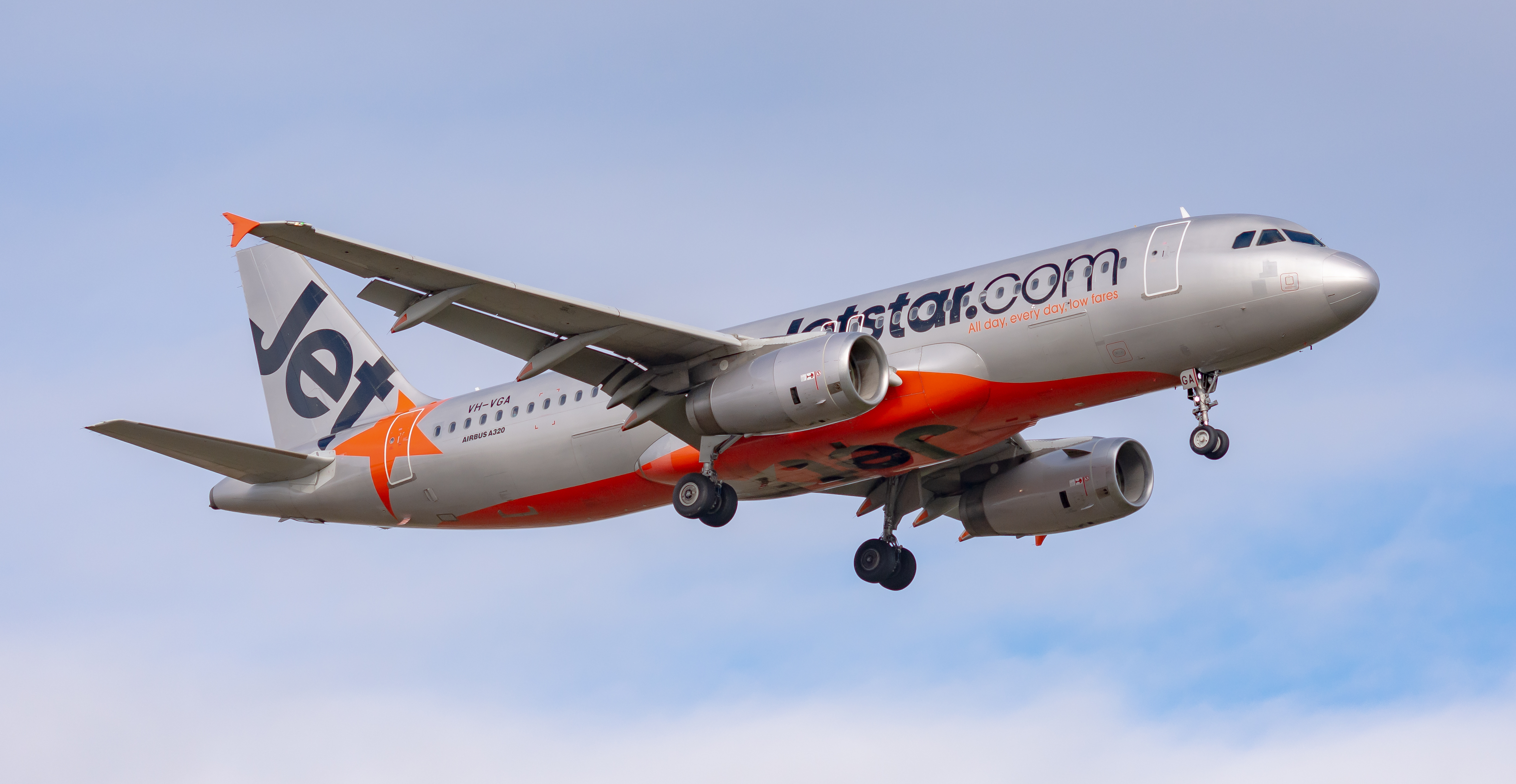
Airbus A320-200

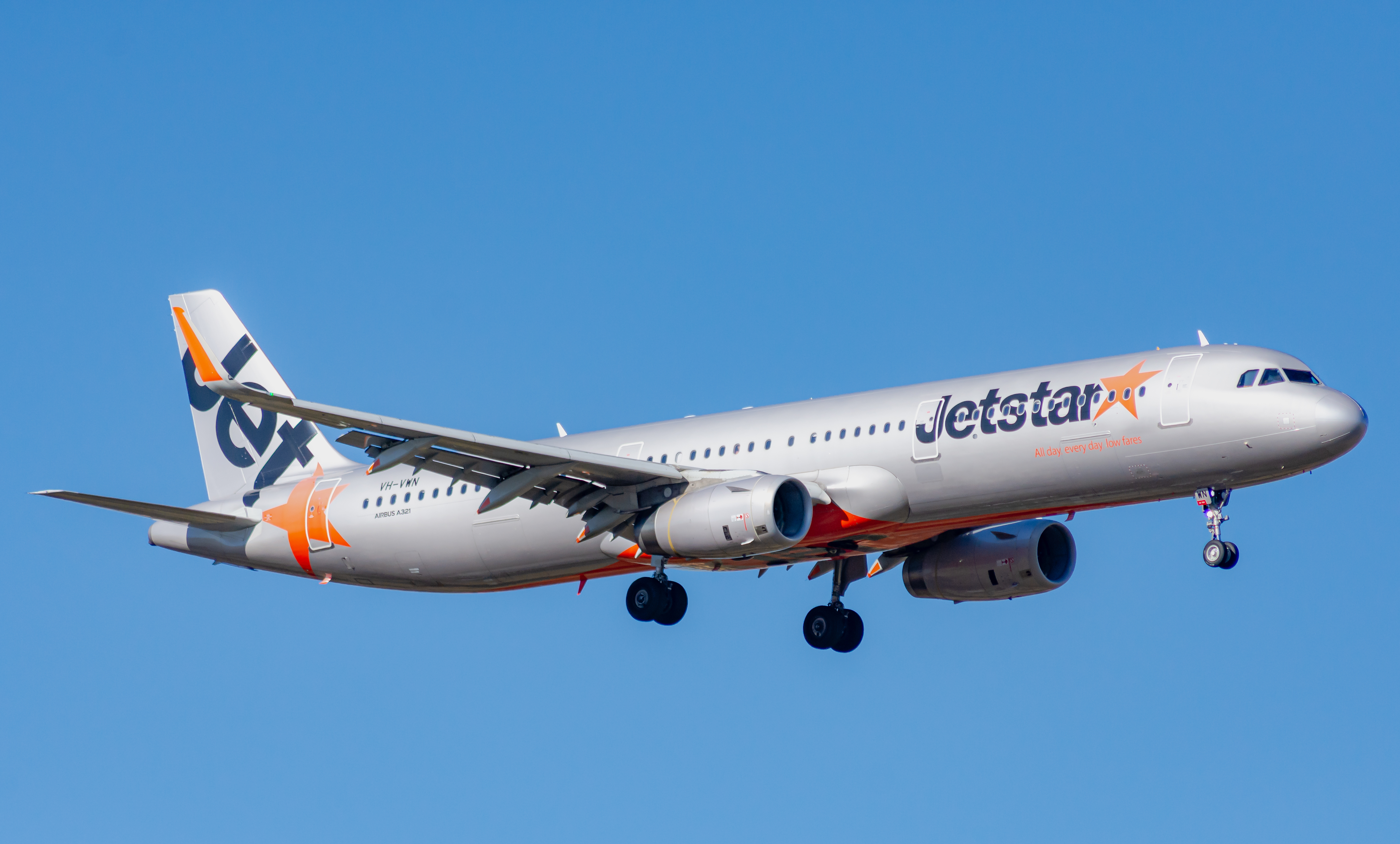
Airbus A321-200

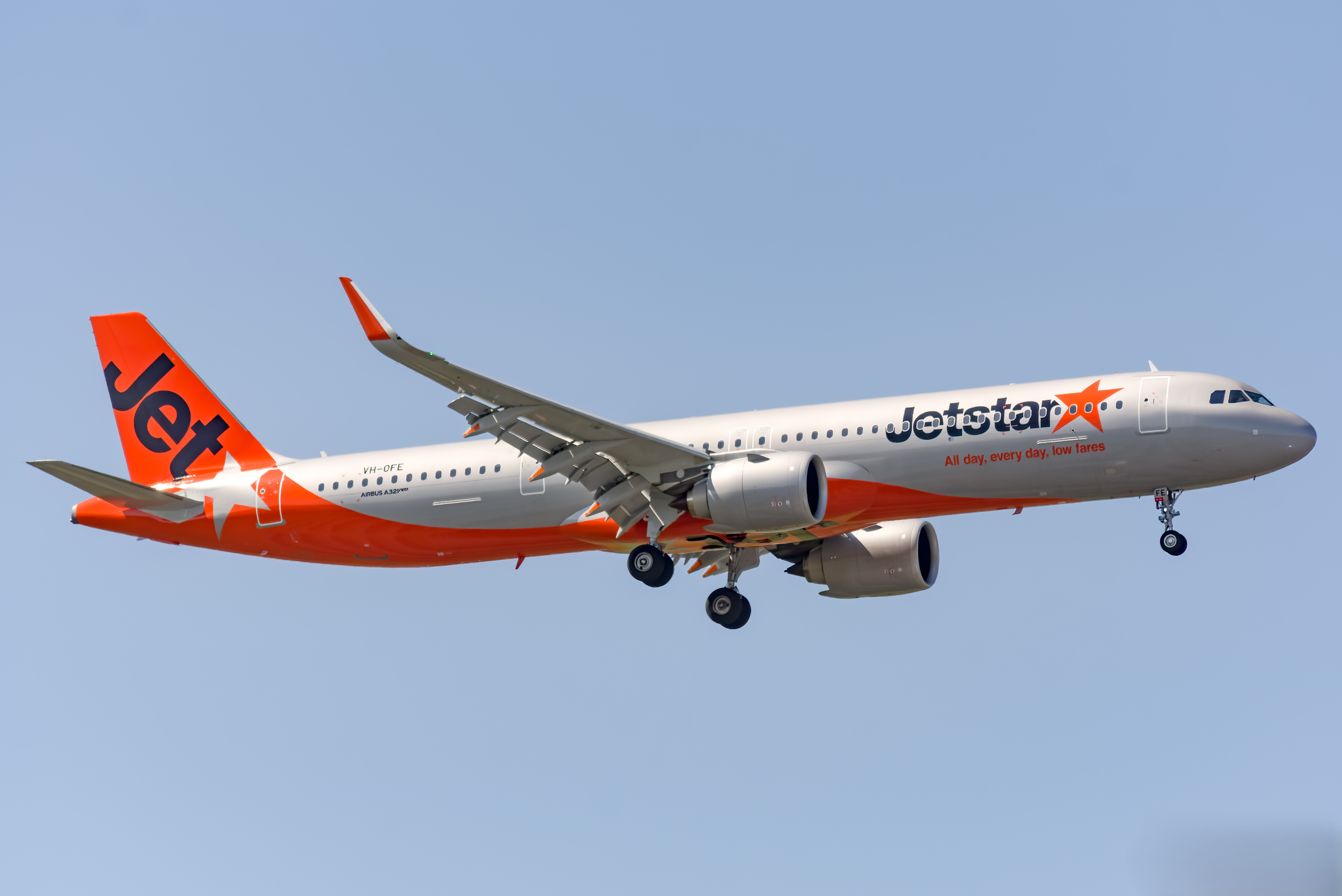
Airbus A321LR

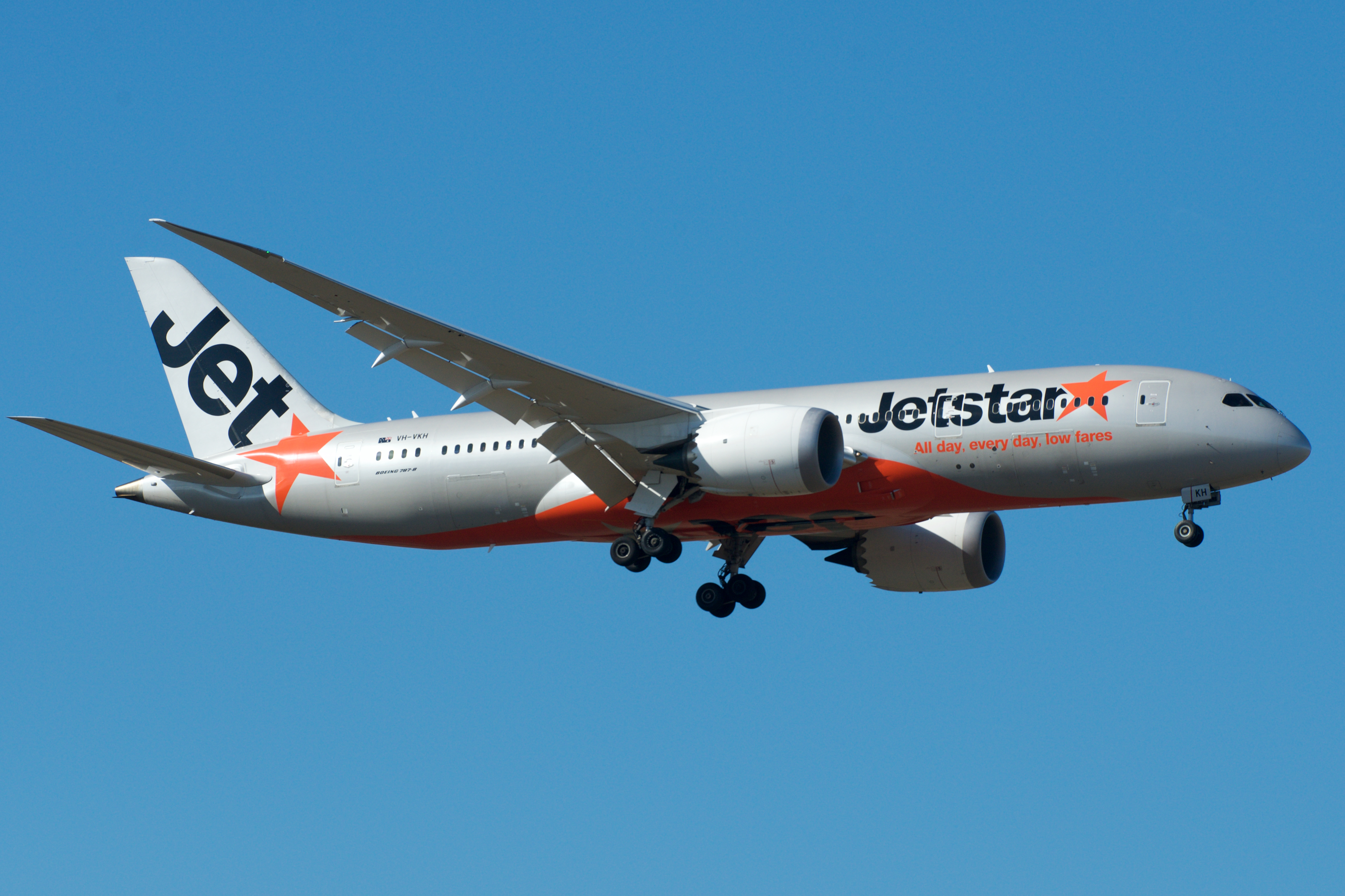
Boeing 787-8

In October 2011, Qantas Group placed an order for 110 Airbus A320 family aircraft, with 11 allocated to a planned new Qantas Group premium airline in Asia (never actually established) and 99 to various Jetstar-branded airlines including Jetstar Hong Kong, which received aircraft but never commenced operations. The order consisted of 32 A320ceos and 78 A320neos, with scope to convert some to the larger A321s.

In 2014, Qantas Group converted 21 orders for the A320ceo to the newer re-engined A320neos, taking the total A320neo family aircraft on order to 99.

In 2016, the operator or operators of the A320neos and A321neos (Jetstar or Qantas) remained unspecified.

In November 2017, the order consisted of 54 A320neos and 45 A321neos as some of the A320neo orders were converted to A321neos.

In February 2018, 18 A321neo orders were converted to the longer-range A321LRs to allow Jetstar Airways to deploy some of its Boeing 787s onto other routes.

In June 2019, at the Paris Air Show, Qantas Group converted 26 more A321neo orders to the ultra-long-range A321XLR and 10 more A321neo orders to the longer-range A321LR. In addition, 10 further A321XLRs were ordered. Total orders for the A320neo family were 109: 45 A320neos, 28 A321LRs, and 36 A321XLRs. How these planes will be distributed throughout the Qantas Group has not been announced; 28 of the 36 A321XLRs on order have been earmarked for Qantas by ex-CEO Alan Joyce. In July 2022, the airline took its first A321LR.

In May 2022, with the Qantas Group confirming its Project Sunrise and Winton aircraft orders, the group combined Jetstar's outstanding A320neo family order to a single Qantas Group order, this included allocating 20 A321XLR for Jetstar. In August 2025, this was readjusted to 12 aircraft, with an announcement that aircraft are to be configured in a two class configuration.

In November 2023, Jetstar announced a major revamp of its fleet of 11 Boeing 787-8 Dreamliners from late 2025. The multi-million dollar aircraft upgrade will have new RECARO Seats in business and economy (with the business class offering increasing from 21 to 44), a lie-flat crew rest area, Wi-Fi connectivity to replace entertainment screens and a new livery to match the Airbus A321LR.

=== Former fleet ===
Jetstar formerly operated the following aircraft:

Jetstar former fleet
Aircraft	Total	Introduced	Retired	Notes
Airbus A330-200	11	2006	2015	All transferred to Qantas.
Boeing 717-200	14	2004	2007	Inherited from Impulse Airlines. All transferred to QantasLink.
De Havilland Canada Dash 8-300	5	2015	2019	Operated by Eastern Australia Airlines. All returned to QantasLink.

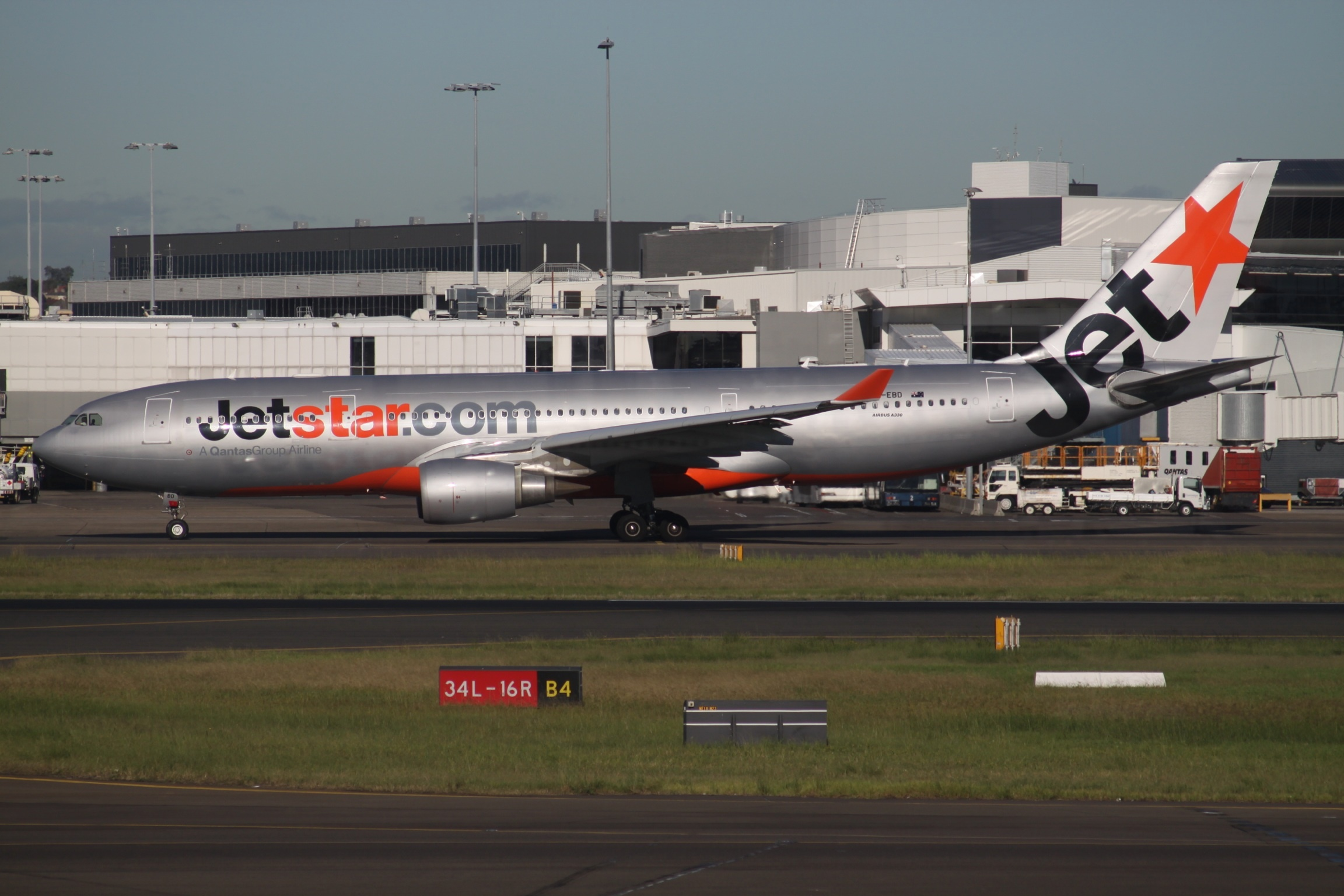
Airbus A330-200

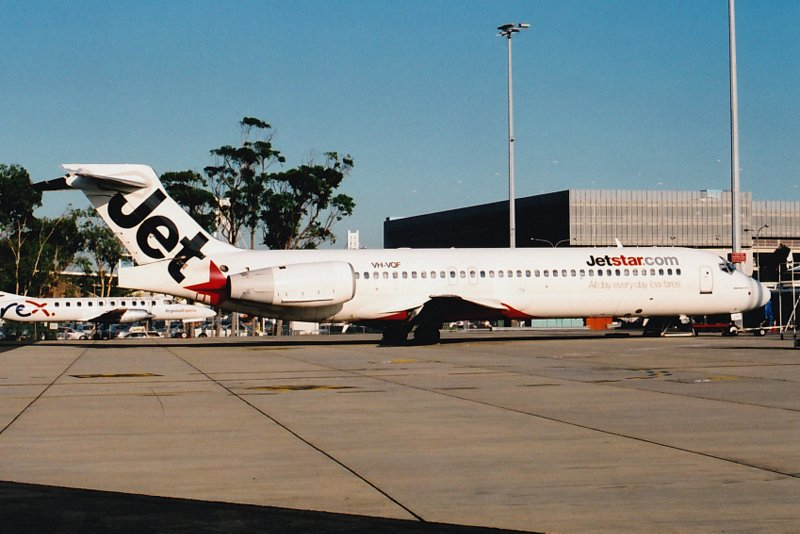
Boeing 717-200

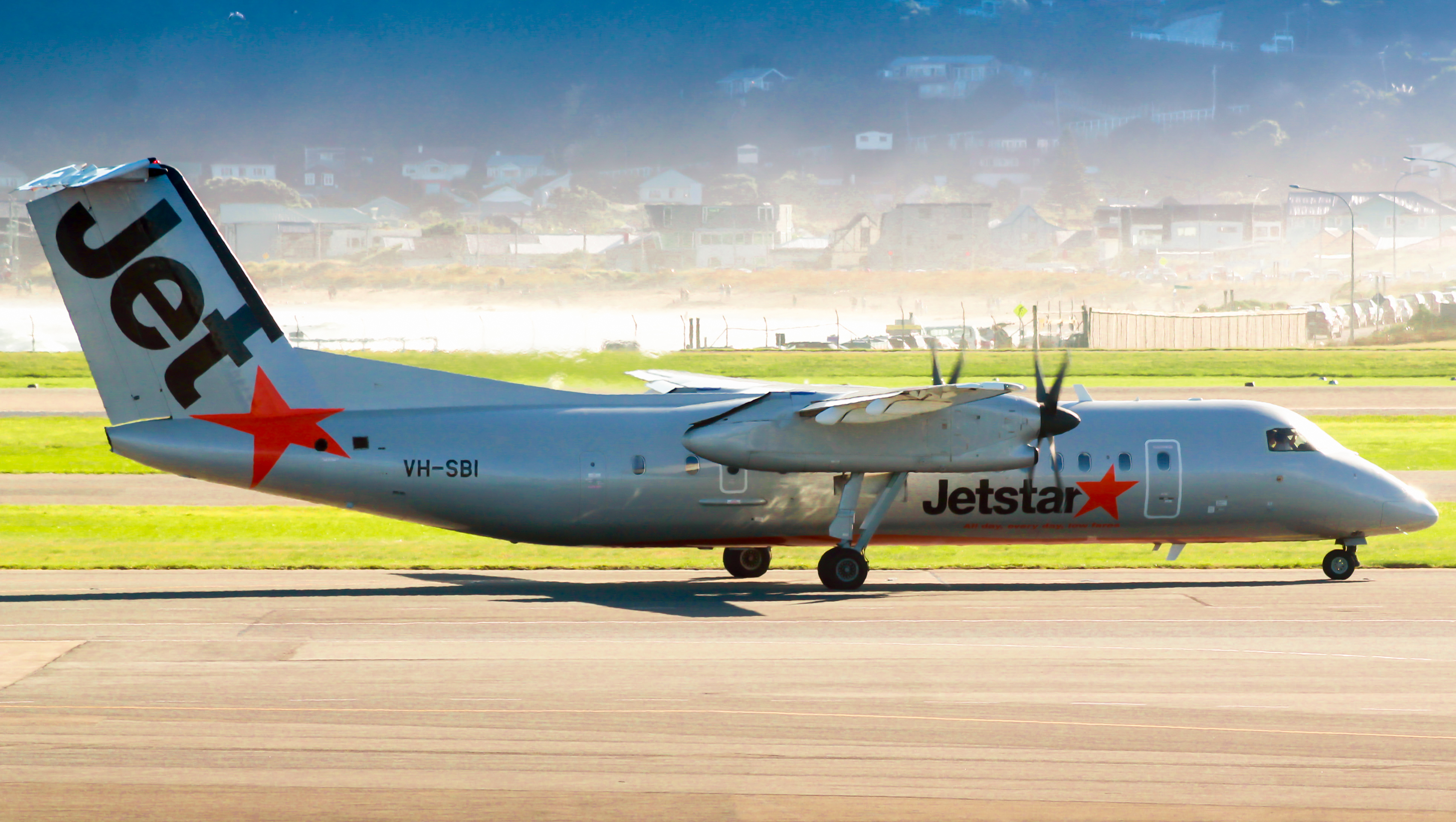
De Havilland Canada Dash 8-300

== In-flight service ==
=== Cabins ===
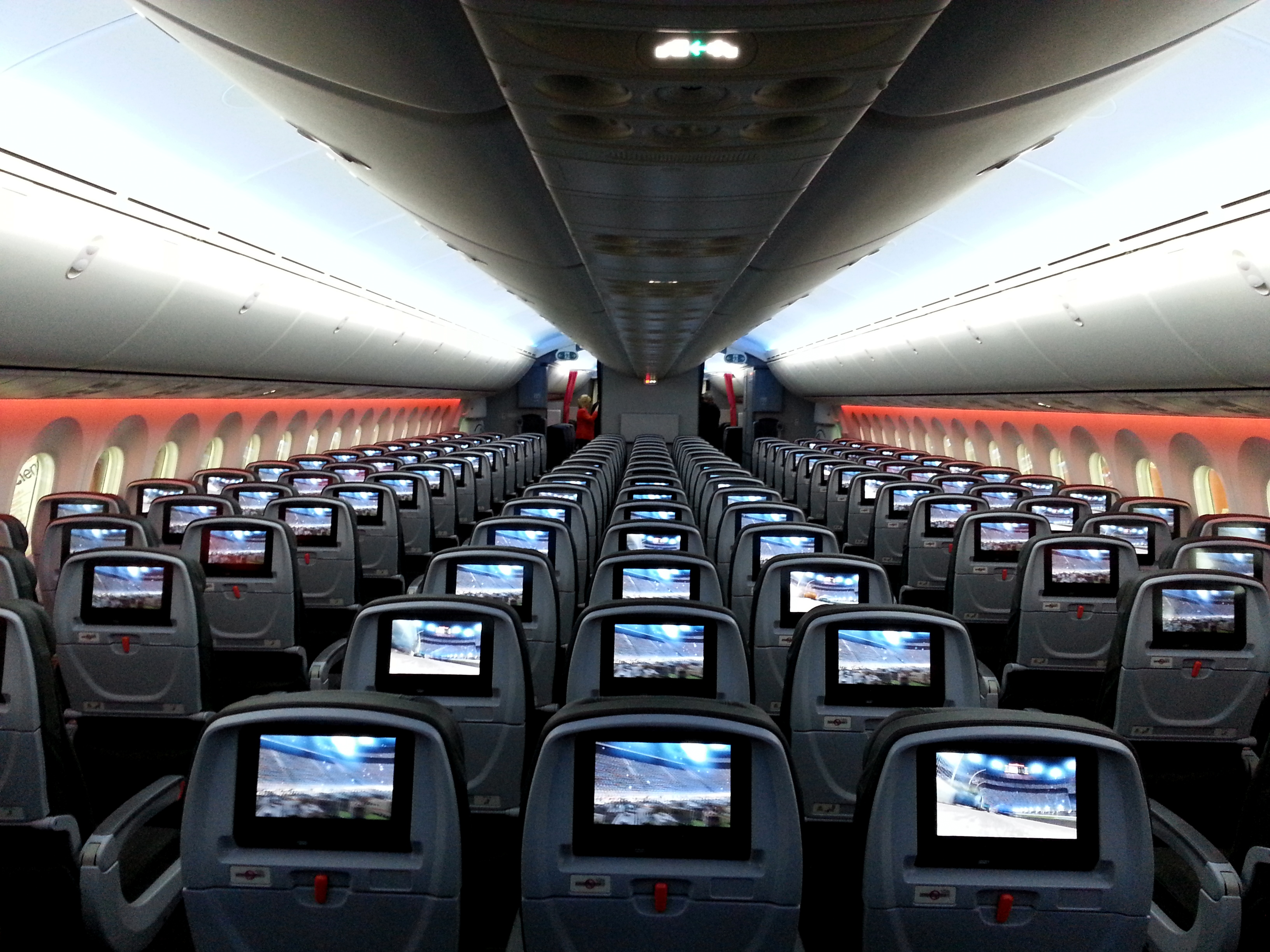
Interior of a Jetstar Boeing 787-8

On all Boeing 787 Dreamliner and Airbus A321XLR international routes, Jetstar offers a two-class service.

=== In-flight entertainment ===
The airline has an eponymously named inflight magazine. In November 2011, Jetstar became the first airline to offer passengers iPads for use as in-flight entertainment devices. Jetstar's Boeing 787 aircraft are fitted with 10-inch seat-back on-demand entertainment screens in business class and 9-inch screens in economy class.

== Jetstar Group ==
In addition to owning 100% of Jetstar Airways in Australia, the Qantas Group owns a stake in other Jetstar-branded airlines in the Asia-Pacific region. The airline represent a strategy to provide better growth for the Qantas Group by accessing the intra-Asia market: exploiting both its faster growth and/or its under-penetration by low-cost airline.

Qantas partners with local investors as both a means to overcome foreign ownership or traffic rights restrictions and to keep the ventures "capital light", i.e. reduce the capital investment required by Qantas and keep assets such as aircraft off the Qantas balance sheet.

From 2008 to 2020, the Group also consisted Jetstar Pacific, a Vietnamese subsidiary which is also co-owned by Vietnam Airlines (nearly 70%). However, since July 2020, this carrier left the Jetstar Group and rebranded to Pacific Airlines.

From 2004 to 2025, the Group operated Jetstar Asia, a subsidiary based in Singapore serving the Asia-Pacific region, with 16 routes ceased at its end of operation.

On 3 February 2026, the Qantas Group announced it would sell its share in Jetstar Japan by June 2027, with the new investors to rebrand the airline.

The Jetstar Group is currently headed by CEO Stephanie Tully. From 2008 to 2012, Bruce Buchanan was the CEO of the Jetstar Group.

The Jetstar Group consists of the following airlines:

Country	Airline	IATA	ICAO	Callsign	Date joined group	Fleet size	Qantas Group ownership	Other owners
Australia	Jetstar Airways	JQ	JST	Jetstar	2003	72	100%	
Japan	Jetstar Japan	GK	JJP	Orange Liner	2011	24	33.3%	Japan Airlines (33.3%); Century Tokyo Leasing Corporation (16.7%); Mitsubishi Corporation (16.7%)
