= Bruce Buchanan (executive) =

Australian business executive

- Born: Sydney, Australia
- Education: Australian Graduate School of Management; UCLA Anderson School of Management
- Occupation: Business executive
- Employer(s): Rokt; Jetstar Airways (former); Qantas (former)
- Known for: Rokt

Bruce Buchanan is an Australian business executive. He previously served as Group Chief Executive Officer of Jetstar Airways, a low-cost airline subsidiary of Qantas, from 2008 to 2012. Buchanan is currently the chief executive officer and co-founder of Rokt, a publicly held technology company headquartered in New York City.

== Early life and education ==
Buchanan was born in Sydney, New South Wales, Australia. He graduated from the University of New South Wales with a Bachelor of Engineering degree in civil engineering. He later obtained a Master of Business Administration from the Australian Graduate School of Management and the UCLA Anderson School of Management.

== Career ==
While at university, Buchanan ran an IT business for five years. Upon completing his MBA, he worked at the Boston Consulting Group. Afterwards, Buchanan joined Jetstar and helped develop the airline's long-haul, low-fare international model.

On 1 October 2008, Buchanan was appointed chief executive officer of the Jetstar Group, succeeding Alan Joyce, who had been named CEO of the Qantas Group. In May 2012, as part of a broader Qantas Group restructure, Buchanan's departure was announced; he remained with the airline for several months to assist with the transition. While Buchanan was the chief executive, Jetstar expanded its low-cost operations across the Asia-Pacific region.

Later in 2012, Buchanan co-founded Rokt in Sydney, Australia. Buchanan has served as its chief executive officer since its founding. In 2025, Buchanan hired 160 entry-level employees for Rokt while other companies similar were laying off employees and hiring few entry-level workers.

== See also ==
- Jetstar Airways
- Qantas
- Rokt
