= Ladyhill Hotel =

Former hotel in Tanglin, Singapore

Coordinates: 1.3104°N 103.8224°E

- Ladyhill Hotel in 1968
- Interactive map of the Ladyhill Hotel area

General information
- Opening: 1968
- Closed: 31 May 1999

Design and construction
- Architect: Wee Chwee Heng

Other information
- Number of rooms: 180

Ladyhill Hotel was a hotel on Lady Hill Road in Tanglin, Singapore. Completed in 1968, it was owned by the Goodwood Group, which was owned by prominent banker and hotelier Tan Sri Khoo Teck Puat. It was closed in 1999 and demolished to make way for a condominium.

== History ==
The six-storey luxury Ladyhill Hotel was opened by the Goodwood Group, which was owned by prominent banker and hotelier Tan Sri Khoo Teck Puat, in 1968. The hotel was designed by Wee Chwee Heng and built with bricks in a "white-and-brown scheme." Each room featured carpets, wall panelling made of teak, curtains made in America, lamps made in Hong Kong and bedspreads made in Thailand, with "de luxe" rooms including refrigerators. A Japanese section of the hotel, which was to include a restaurant and a garden, was then in the planning stages. It was managed by former model Cecilia Seow, making her the "first woman manager of a luxury hotel in Singapore." The hotel then featured an "American-style" coffee shop which had indoor seats for 60 and another 30 seats in an adjoining terrace. The coffee shop was situated next to a pool and its walls were "covered with thousands of multi-coloured ping pong balls suspended by strings." The hotel also featured Le Chalet, a 120-seat Swiss-style restaurant which featured cutlery and silverware that was made in Italy, crockery that was made in Germany and glassware that was made in America, as well as a cocktail lounge with a capacity for 70 customers. Le Chalet received a positive review from Diane Wood of New Nation in February 1971. In February 1972, it received a mixed review from Wendy Hutton, also of the New Nation. Seow resigned from her position as the hotel's manager in September 1970 to spend more time with her family.

From August to November 1980, all of the hotel's 180 rooms, as well as its coffeeshop, the cocktail lounge and a function room, were renovated and refurbished. In July 1982, its entry to the Singapore Tourist Promotion Board skit and drama competition won first place. The Ladyhill Barbecue Ranch opened at the hotel in July 1983. In December of the following year, one of the deluxe rooms was converted into a function room. 28 of the hotel's staff was laid off in November 1985 as a result of a "downturn in business." The general manager of the hotel then was Dieter Loewe, who also served as the general manager of the Boulevard Hotel, also owned by the Goodwood Group, and later as the general manager the Omni Marco Polo Hotel. In June 1988, it was announced that the Far East Organization was set to acquire the hotel, which was then the "smallest hotel in the Goodwood chain", for $38 million. However, the deal fell through and the Goodwood Group began considering other offers for the hotel.

In May 1997, the Goodwood Group announced that it would be putting the hotel, which by then had become "tired and drab", up for sale with an asking price of $185 million, shortly after it had sold off the Boulevard Hotel. In January 1999, the hotel was acquired for $63.5 million by Simon Cheong, the CEO of SC Global, who announced his intention to redevelop it into an "Amanpuri-style" luxury condominium within the next two years. Permission to rezone the site for residential use had been obtained by the local authorities in late 1998. The hotel closed down on 31 May 1999, after which it was demolished to make way for The Ladyhill, a luxury condominium which was completed in 2002.
