= Simon Cheong =

Singaporean businessman

Simon Cheong Sae Peng (simplified Chinese: 钟世平; traditional Chinese: 鍾世平; pinyin: Zhōng Shìpíng; born c. 1957) is a Singaporean businessman, founder of property developer SC Global Developments Company. In 2013, Forbes estimated his fortune at $410 million.

== Career ==
Cheong has a BS degree in Civil Engineering from the University of Washington and a Master of Business Administration from George Washington University. He led Citibank's real estate finance division in Singapore and then Credit Suisse First Boston's Asian real estate division prior to setting up SC Global in 1996. He also owns 41% of Australia's housing developer, AVJennings.

In 1999, Cheong bought MPH Group and took SC Global public via a reverse merger. He sold MPH Group in 2002 to Malaysian businessman Syed Mokhtar Al-Bukhary.

Cheong was elected president of the Real Estate Developers Association of Singapore (REDAS) in 2007, and re-elected for another two-year term in 2009.

In 2017, Cheong was appointed as an independent director of Singapore Airlines. He had served as a board member of Republic Polytechnic and Singapore Turf Club previously.

In 2018, his group SC Global owned 1 million square feet of high-end residential apartments. In August 2022, he opened a Setsu resort hotel in Niseko.
