= MPH Group =

Malaysian bookshop and printing company

MPH Group (M) Sdn Bhd

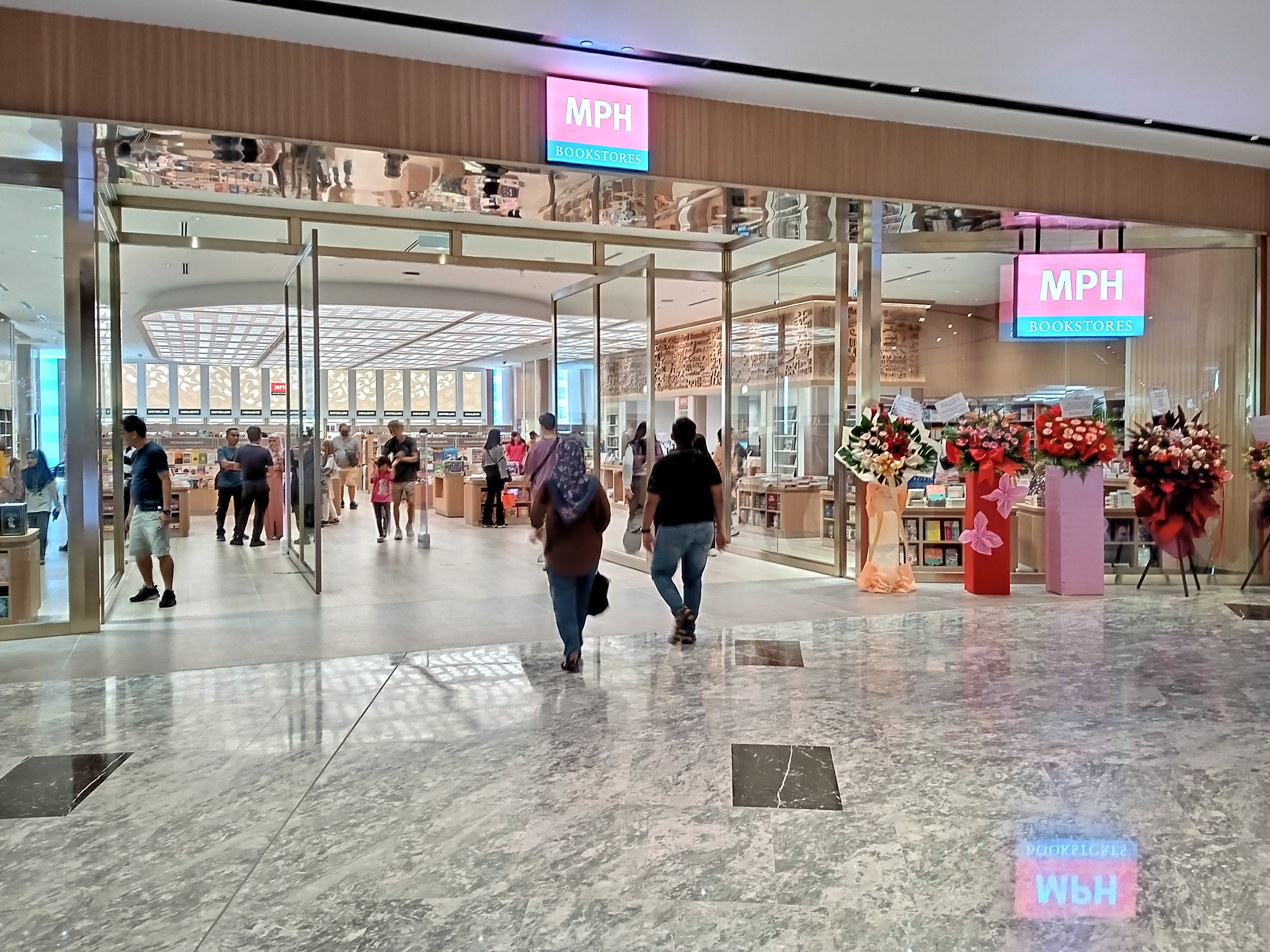
- MPH Bookstores The Exchange TRX branch in Kuala Lumpur, Malaysia
- Type: Private limited company
- Industry: Retail (Specialty)
- Founded: 1890; 136 years ago, as Amelia Bishop Press
- Founder: William G. Shellabear
- Headquarters: Petaling Jaya, Selangor, Malaysia,
- Number of locations: 15
- Products: Books, magazines, stationery, greeting cards
- Subsidiaries: MPH Bookstores Sdn Bhd; MPH Distributors Sdn Bhd; MPH Group Printing; MPH Group Publishing
- Website: http://www.mphonline.com/

MPH Group Malaysia Sdn Bhd is a Malaysian group of companies best known for its book retailing and online retailing services as well as being involved in the printing, publishing and distribution of books and library services in Malaysia and Singapore. Its bookstore chain, MPH Bookstores Sdn Bhd, headquartered in Petaling Jaya, Selangor, has been among the largest in Malaysia after Popular. In 2020 MPH closed many of its bookstores in Malaysia and Singapore and concentrated its efforts on selling books via its online bookstore.

== History ==
The Triglot Vocabulary, Sixth Edition (1913): published by the Methodist Publishing House and originally compiled by its founder William Girdlestone Shellabear with the Rev. B. F. West, not credited in this edition.

Captain W.G. Shellabear is recognized as the founder of MPH. In 1890, he established the Amelia Bishop Press in Singapore, publishing Christian literature. The company eventually began publishing secular works as well, changing its name to the American Mission Press in 1893. In the 1900s, Rev. William T. Cherry expanded the organization's activities to printing, publishing, bookselling, and book distribution. He changed the company's name to Methodist Publishing House in 1906, giving rise to the acronym 'MPH', as the company is known today. Beginning in 1906 the firm published the Malay Literature Series.

The administration and editor's office of the Methodist Publishing House was located in a two storey Edwardian style building at the corner of Stamford Road and Armenian Street in Singapore. Constructed in 1907-08, the building housed a printing press and also served for decades as an MPH bookstore.

MPH changed its name in 1927 to the Malaya Publishing House and in 1963 it was renamed as the Malaysia Publishing House, but throughout the acronym MPH remained. The company also changed ownership multiple times, being acquired by an Indonesian consortium Led By Mr Tjio Wie Thay A.k.a Masagung in 1966, then a Hong Kong group, Jack Chia-MPH, in 1972 and finally by Singaporean entrepreneur Simon Cheong in 1999. In 2002, Jalinan Inspirasi Sdn Bhd, acquired the company. This was the first time MPH became a wholly Malaysian-owned company.

== Bookstores ==
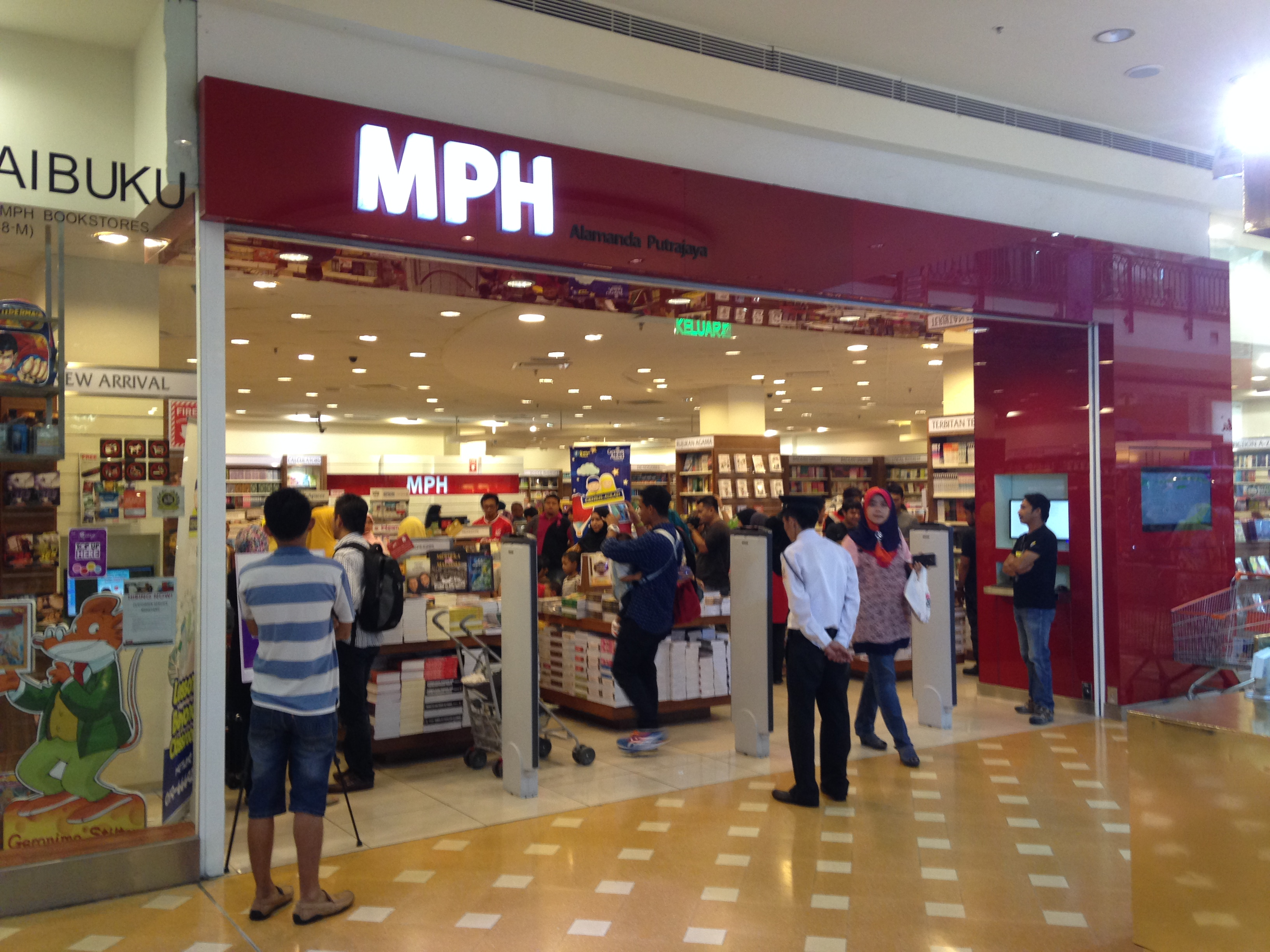
An MPH book store at Alamanda Putrajaya

In early 2019 MPH had 29 bookstores in Malaysia and three in Singapore. It had a heavy presence in the Klang Valley, operating in major shopping outlets including Mid Valley. Its bookstores in Singapore were located at Raffles City, Parkway Parade, and in the SingPost Centre in Paya Lebar.

Following a partial lockdown from the COVID-19 pandemic and several social media posts alleging the closure of nine MPH stores nationwide including four in the Klang Valley, MPH staff members confirmed that their outlet in Subang Parade would be closing on 6 June 2020. Following the online speculation, in June 2020 the MPH Group CEO Donald Kee issued a statement outlining "its strategy as a transition into a more e-commerce-focused retail format, consolidating non-performing stores and pooling resources for a digital-business push", as well as deploying "high-tech vending machines placed in strategic locations", and launching a "social interactive e-learning platform". He added that the firm would "maintain its key physical locations".

== Online bookstore ==
MPH branched out into the online book retailing via its MPHOnline.com website in 2000.
