= Singapore Airlines fleet =

List of Singapore Airlines aircraft

Singapore Airlines has been in operation since 1972, and operates a predominantly widebody fleet, until the second re-introduction of the Boeing 737 in March 2021 following the merger with SilkAir. The airline also operates Boeing 747-400F and Boeing 777F freighters under the Singapore Airlines Cargo marque. As of July 2026, there were 165 aircraft registered in the Singapore Airlines fleet, comprising 153 passenger aircraft and 12 freighters.

On 16 May 2023, Singapore Airlines confirmed that it had cancelled orders for eight Boeing 737 MAX 8 aircraft and swapped an order for three 787-9s to three 787-10s.

== Current fleet ==
As of November 2026, Singapore Airlines operated the following aircraft:

Singapore Airlines fleet
Aircraft	In service	Orders	Passengers							Notes
Aircraft	In service	Orders	R	F	J	P	Y	Total	Refs	Notes
Airbus A350-900	58	—	—	—	42	24	187	253		Largest operator Includes the 10,000th Airbus aircraft ever builtTo be retrofitted with new Business Class seats starting 2H2027
Airbus A350-900	58	—	—	—	42	24	192	258		Largest operator Includes the 10,000th Airbus aircraft ever builtTo be retrofitted with new Business Class seats starting 2H2027
Airbus A350-900	58	—	—	—	40	—	263	303		Largest operator Includes the 10,000th Airbus aircraft ever builtTo be retrofitted with new Business Class seats starting 2H2027
Airbus A350-900ULR	7	—	—	—	67	94	—	161		Launch customer
Airbus A350-900ULR	7	—	—	4	70	58	—	132		To be retrofitted with new First Class and Business Class seats
Airbus A380-800	12	—	6	—	78	44	343	471		Launch customer Older aircraft to be retired and replaced by Boeing 777-9; Includes one aircraft in storage
Boeing 737 MAX 8	26	3	—	—	10	—	144	154		
Boeing 777-300ER	22	—	—	4	48	28	184	264		Older aircraft to be retired and replaced by Boeing 777-9
Boeing 777-9	—	31	—	6	54	36	204	300		Expected deliveries to begin in 2027; Replacing older Airbus A380s and Boeing 777-300ERs
Boeing 787-10	28	3	—	—	36	—	301	337		Launch customer Includes the 1,000th Boeing 787 Dreamliner ever built
Total	153	37								

== Fleet development ==
=== Airbus A350 ===
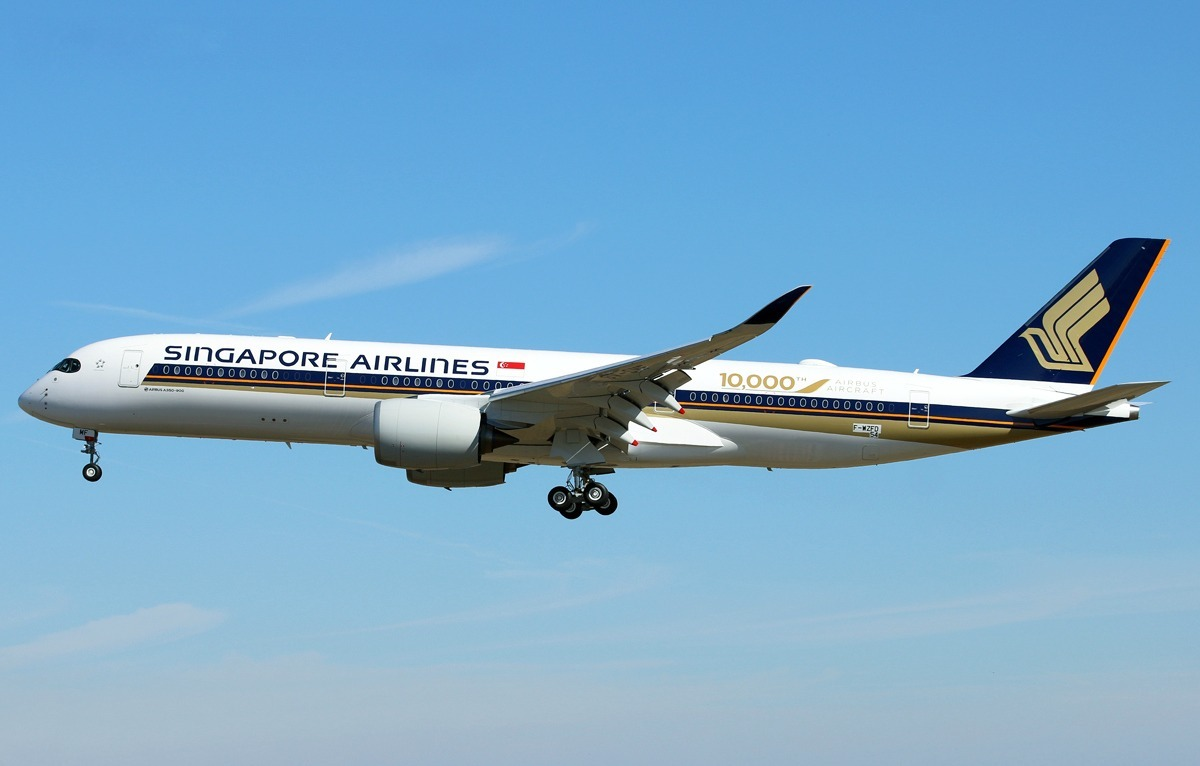
Airbus A350-900 registered as 9V-SMF, the 10,000th aircraft built by Airbus Industries

Singapore Airlines placed an order for thirty Airbus A350-900 aircraft in 2006, with another thirty ordered in 2013. The airline took delivery of the first of the aircraft in February 2016 and flew its delivery flight to Singapore on 2 March, with regular A350 services commencing on 9 May 2016. Adelaide was the inaugural destination for the medium-haul specification of the A350, operating as flight SQ279 from Singapore on 18 December 2018.

On 13 October 2015, Singapore Airlines announced that it had placed orders for seven Airbus A350-900ULR (Ultra-Long Range) aircraft, which will see the return of non-stop flights from Singapore to both New York and Los Angeles. The first A350-900ULR was delivered to Singapore Airlines in the third quarter of 2018, allowing the non-stop flights to New York (Newark Liberty International Airport) to resume on 11 October 2018. This was followed by a resumption of the non-stop flights to Los Angeles from 2 November 2018, with a new non-stop service to Seattle commencing in September 2019.

A letter of intent for 7 A350 Freighters (with 5 options) announced on 15 December 2021, for delivery in Q4 2025.

=== Airbus A380 ===
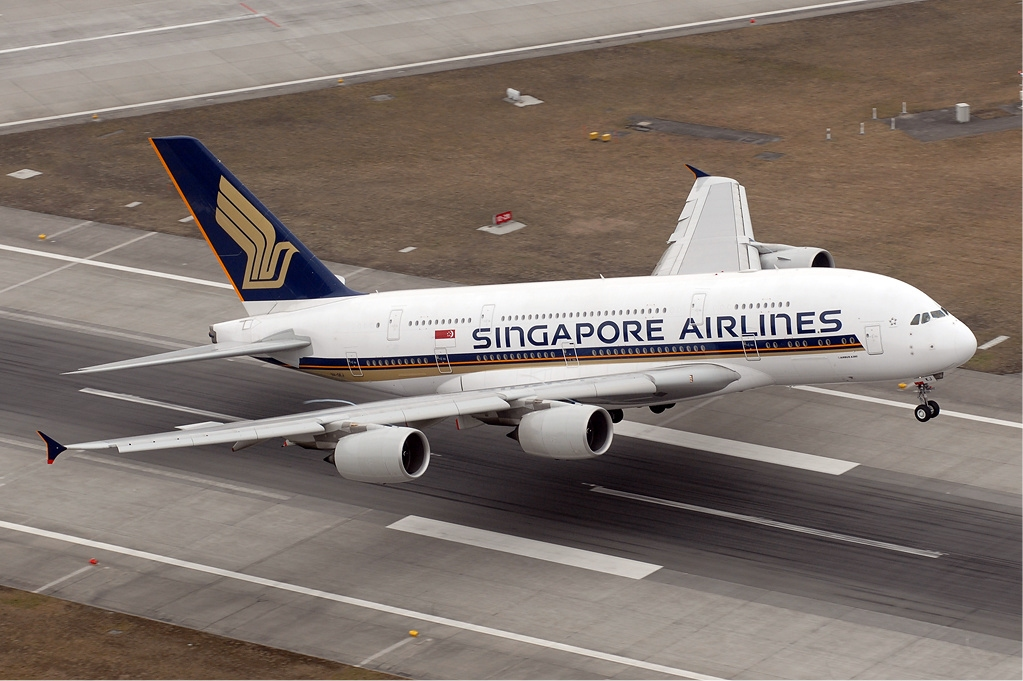
Singapore Airlines was the first airline to operate the Airbus A380-800

Singapore Airlines became the first airline to operate the Airbus A380-800 on 25 October 2007, after a series of delays. The airline placed orders for nineteen A380s with six options. The first flight was a return trip from Singapore to Sydney, with a flight designation of Flight 380 to signify the first commercial flight of the A380. To mark this moment in aviation history, SIA auctioned all the tickets in a special agreement with eBay, beginning on 27 August 2007 for two weeks, and donated all the proceeds to charity. Close to $1.3 million was raised for charity through the auction.

The airline also uses the A380 to serve commemorative or seasonal flights. Singapore Airlines became the first to operate commercial A380 flights into Beijing from 2 to 8 August 2008 to meet higher passenger traffic during the Beijing Summer Olympic Games and operated the A380 seasonally to Osaka in August 2012. On 9 August 2015, a Singapore Airlines A380 took part in the Singapore National Day Parade as part of Singapore's 50th anniversary celebrations. The aircraft was painted with a special livery and operated a special Charity Flight on 29 May 2015.

In 2012, Singapore Airlines agreed to order five more A380s, to be delivered from 2017. They feature new Suites, Business Class and Economy cabins, as well as Premium Economy seats which were already being rolled out on existing A380s. In 2016, the airline confirmed that one A380 would be returned to its leasing company in October 2017 at the end of its ten-year lease, with a decision still to be made regarding retention of four additional A380 aircraft whose leases expire between January and June 2018. The first A380 was taken out of service in August 2017.

In November 2020, the airline announced that it would retire seven additional Airbus A380s due to the impact of the COVID-19 pandemic on aviation, leaving 12 aircraft to operate in its fleet post-pandemic. On 5 October 2021, two retired Airbus A380s were towed to Changi Exhibition Centre to be cut up for scrap.

=== Boeing 737 ===
Boeing 737 MAX 8

In 2021, the existing six 737 MAX 8s that have been in service with SilkAir and the remaining 31 on order were transferred to Singapore Airlines. In all, Singapore Airlines will have 37 737 MAX 8s in the fleet. These planes will receive seat upgrades for economy class and will feature a new business class seat.

=== Boeing 747 ===
Boeing 747-400F

Singapore Airlines Cargo was established as a separate airline in 2001 to operate Singapore Airlines' cargo aircraft. Singapore Airlines Cargo ceased operations in 2018 and its fleet of seven Boeing 747-400F freighters was subsequently transferred to Singapore Airlines.

=== Boeing 777 ===
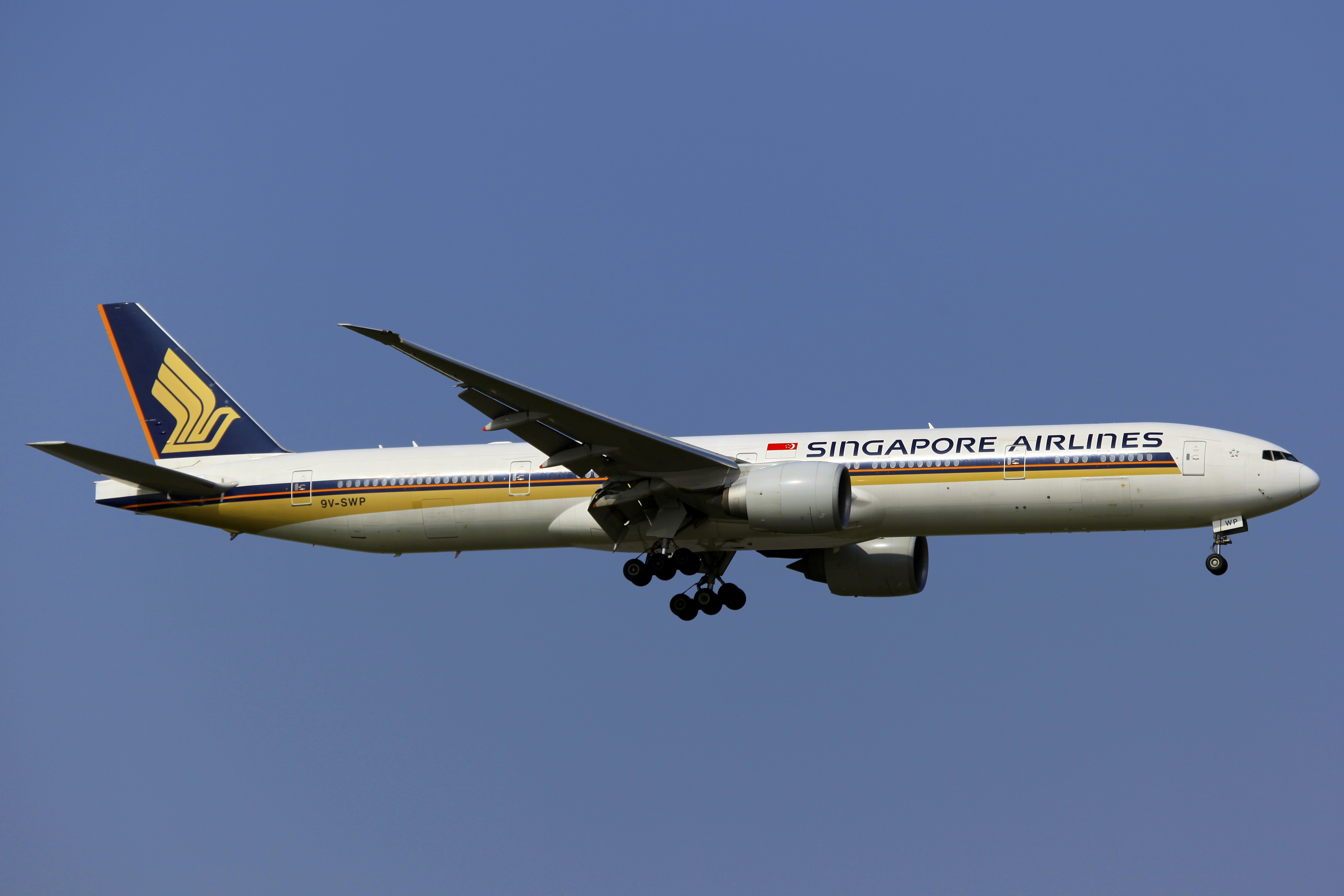
Boeing 777-300ER

Singapore Airlines' 777-200ERs were the first to enter service, with the first delivered on 5 May 1997. While Singapore Airlines lists some of its 777-200ER jets as 777-200 aircraft, all of the supposed -200 series aircraft were built with enhancements usually exclusive to the -200ER, with the single modification being the Trent 892 engines derated to the -884 spec used on the standard -200 aircraft, reducing the MTOW and thus aircraft fees at the airport when categorized by maximum takeoff weight (MTOW).

On 10 December 1998, Singapore Airlines took delivery of its first Boeing 777-300. The airline announced the order of 19 Boeing 777-300ER aircraft in August 2004 with the order signed on 23 December 2004, during which an unused option for the Boeing 777 family was converted into an order for a Boeing 777-300ER. Singapore Airlines became the world's largest operator of the Boeing 777 when it took delivery of its 58th such aircraft, a Boeing 777-300, on 6 May 2005. It has since been surpassed by Emirates, which as of November 2017 has 159 examples in its fleet. The airline's Boeing 777-300ERs entered commercial service on 5 December 2006.

On 9 July 2013, Singapore Airlines, in collaboration with two design firms, James Park Associates and DesignworksUSA, unveiled the next generation of cabin products for First, Business, and Economy class, that entered service in newly delivered Boeing 777-300ERs. The product was later extended to all Boeing 777-300ERs. Singapore Airlines also introduced its new Premium Economy product on 9 August 2015 on the Boeing 777-300ER with the refits completed by the end of March 2019.

On 11 March 2022, it was announced that Singapore Airlines would operate 5 Boeing 777 freighters on behalf of DHL Aviation. As part of the agreement, crew and maintenance will be provided by Singapore Airlines and SIA Engineering Company respectively.

=== Boeing 787 ===
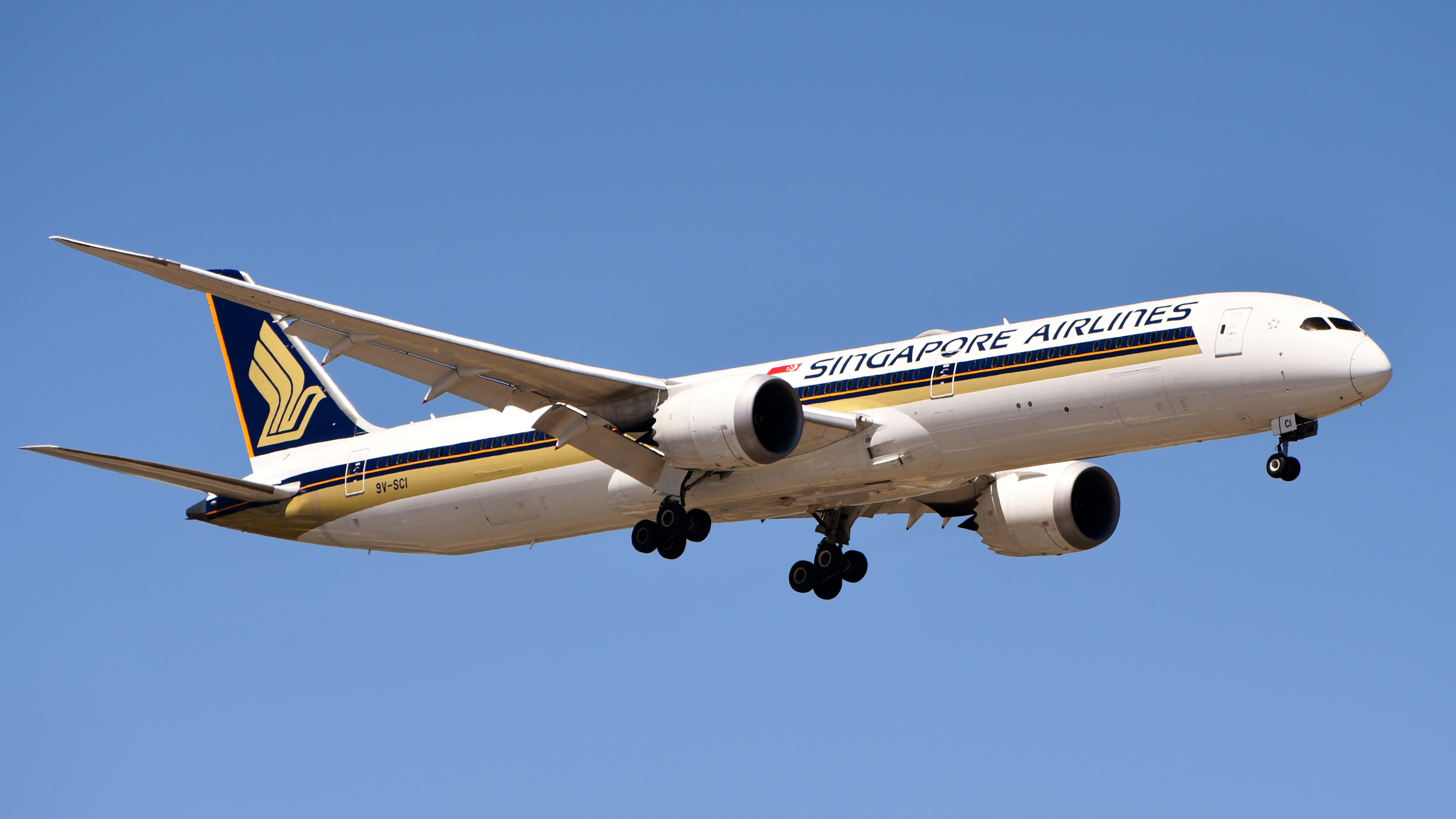
Boeing 787-10

Singapore Airlines placed an order for 20 Boeing 787-9 aircraft in 2006, choosing it over the initial Airbus A350 design. Later in 2012, when Singapore Airlines ordered the Airbus A350, the 787-9 order was transferred to its low-cost subsidiary, Scoot.

In 2013, Singapore Airlines placed a new order for 30 Boeing 787-10 aircraft. On 8 February 2018, Singapore Airlines announced the Boeing 787-10 would initially be used on crew-training flights before commencing regular services in May 2018. On 28 March 2018, the new regional cabin product was unveiled following the delivery of the first Boeing 787-10.

In October 2018, Singapore Airlines converted two of its Boeing 787-10s on order to Boeing 787-8s and allocated the two aircraft to Scoot.

== Future fleet ==
=== Boeing 777X ===
On 9 February 2017, Singapore Airlines signed a letter of intent to purchase 39 aircraft - 20 Boeing 777-9Xs and an additional 19 Boeing 787-10s. The deal also includes options for 12 more aircraft. The proposed order, which is valued at US$13.8 billion based on published list prices, includes flexibility for the Singapore Airlines Group to substitute the 787-10 orders for other variants of the 787 family. On 23 October 2017, the deal was finalised at the White House and was witnessed by the Prime Minister of Singapore Lee Hsien Loong and U.S. President Donald Trump during a state visit. In February 2021, Singapore Airlines adjusted their 777-9 and 787-10 by reducing their 787 order by 14 and ordering an additional 11 777-9. This brings their overall orders for the 777X to 31 and 787-10 to 30. The Boeing 777-9s will be delivered to the airline from 2023 to 2024 financial year.

=== Airbus A350-1000/Boeing 777X ===
In June 2026, It was reported that Singapore Airlines in early negotiation for a potential 50 Airbus A350-1000 or additional Boeing 777X (particularly 777-9).

== Fleet history ==
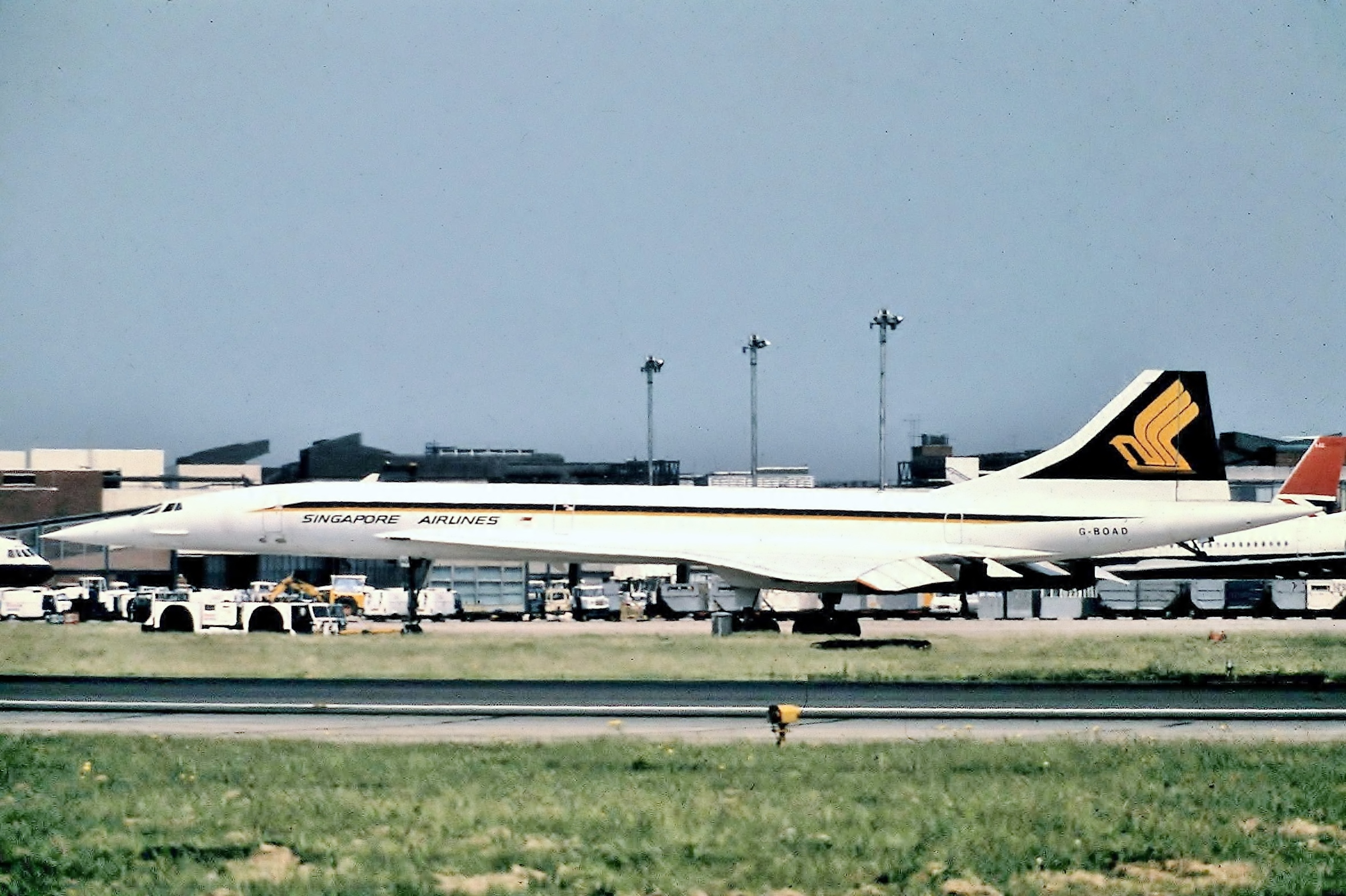
The Singaporean Concorde (G-BOAD) at Heathrow Airport in 1977

Since 1937, the predecessors of Singapore Airlines operated the Airspeed Consul, Boeing 707, Boeing 737, Bristol Britannia, Douglas DC-3, Douglas DC-4, de Havilland Comet 4, Fokker F27 Friendship, Lockheed L-1049 Super Constellation and the Vickers Viscount.

After its incorporation as Singapore Airlines Limited on 28 January 1972 after Malaysia–Singapore Airlines was split to form Malaysia Airlines and Singapore Airlines, the airline acquired seven Boeing 707s and five Boeing 737s from MSA on 30 September 1972. Its first purchase since incorporation was for another second-hand Boeing 707 that was delivered on 1 October 1972.

The first Boeing 747-200 for the airline was delivered soon after on 31 July 1973, which also marked SIA's first direct delivery of a new aircraft. Boeing 727s were delivered from 30 August 1977, Boeing 747-300s from 29 April 1983, and Boeing 757s from 12 November 1984.

Having exclusively purchased Boeing since 1972, in 1977 SIA placed an order for four McDonnell Douglas DC-10s.

In 1979, the airline ordered A300B4s, its first aircraft from Airbus, which joined the fleet the following year. Other Airbus models flown include the Airbus A310 from 1984 and the Airbus A340-300 from 26 October 1996.

In 1977, and from 1979 to 1980, British Airways operated a Concorde (G-BOAD) which was dual-liveried with Singapore Airlines' livery on the port side and British Airways' livery on the starboard side. It was used on the London to Singapore via Bahrain service. The service was withdrawn for financial reasons and complaints about noise from the Malaysian government.

The airline ordered five McDonnell Douglas MD-11s on 16 January 1990, to operate long-haul routes with demand deemed too thin for the Boeing 747. When it was revealed that the MD-11's performance was below expectations in terms of range and fuel burn, the order was cancelled in favour of the Airbus A340-300. The cancellation was seen as particularly damaging to McDonnell Douglas due to the company's reputation. Several years later Airbus, in turn, suffered a setback, however, when rival Boeing successfully negotiated to take SIA's existing A340-300 fleet as well as any still on order in exchange for ten orders for the Boeing 777 in 1999, with Airbus calling the move an "act of desperation" on Boeing's part.

In September 2009, the Airbus A380 marked a milestone with the airline when, with the tenth aircraft delivered, its fleet of A380s exceeded that of the Boeing 747-400 for the first time.

=== Airbus A330 ===
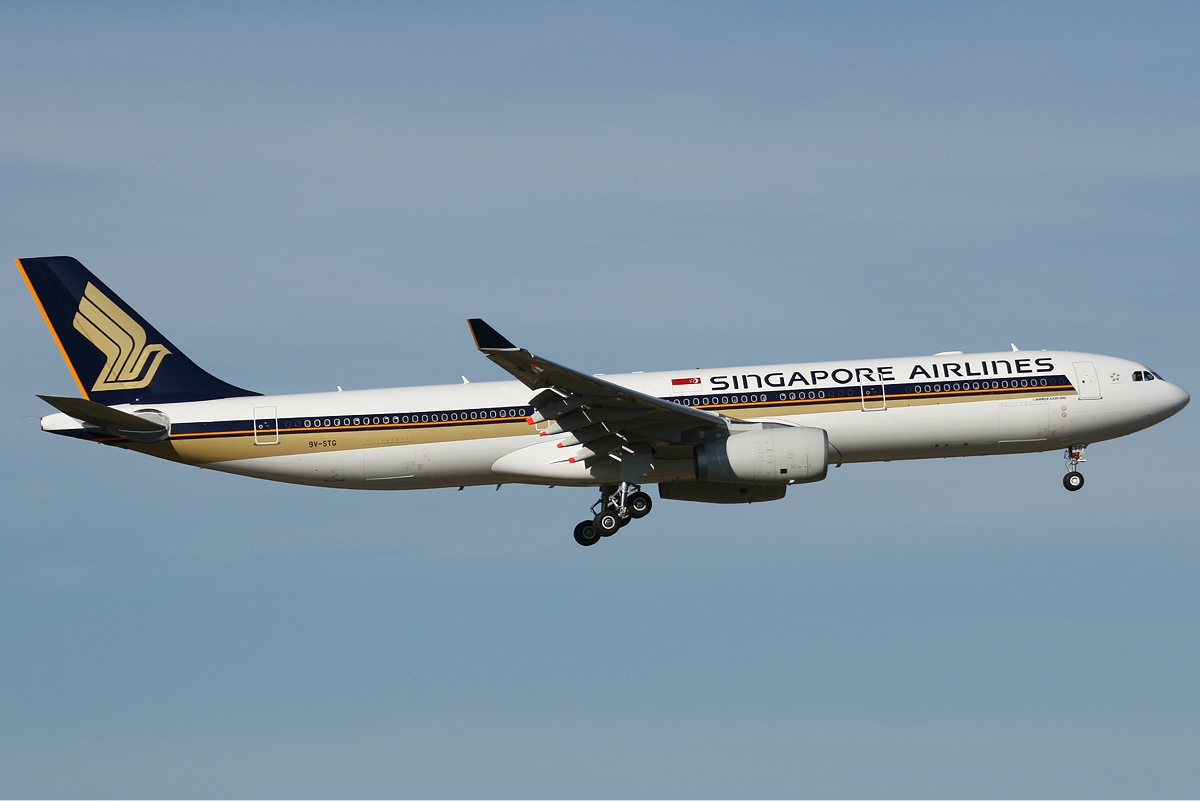
Airbus A330-300

In January 2009, Singapore Airlines received the first of an initial batch of 19 leased Airbus A330. The aircraft were fitted with airline's then-latest cabin offerings in a two-class layout, with 30 seats in Business Class and 255 in Economy Class. It was intended for the A330s to support the carrier's capacity needs until its orders for the Airbus A350 and Boeing 787 were delivered whilst replacing its older Boeing 777s. Used primarily on regional and medium-haul routes, Brisbane was the inaugural destination for the A330 on 30 March 2009. In 2011, the airline committed to leasing an additional 15 aircraft.

In January 2016, the airline confirmed its intention to eventually replace all A330s with A350s in a medium-range configuration. On 15 May 2020, it was announced the remaining A330s would be fully retired earlier by 2021 due to the COVID-19 pandemic.

=== Airbus A340-500 ===
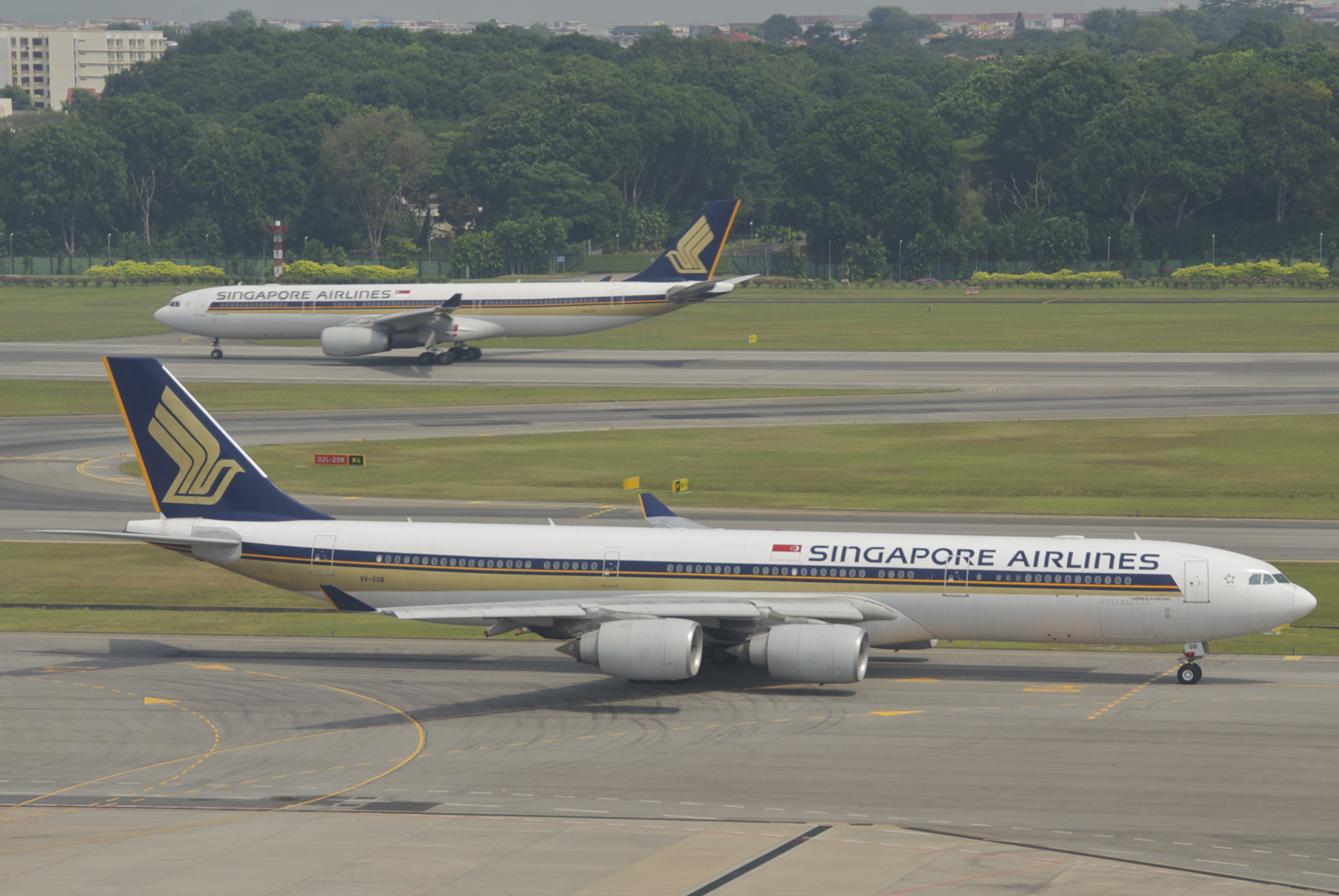
Airbus A340-500

In 1999, SIA made an order for five A340-500 with an option for five additional aircraft. The first aircraft was delivered on 15 October 2003. In 2008, the airline re-configured its A340-500s from 64 business class (Note: Previously known as Raffles Class) and 117 premium economy (Note: Previously known as Executive Economy) seats to an all-business configuration with 100 seats. The aircraft was used to launch non-stop flights from Singapore to both Los Angeles and Newark in 2004. On 24 October 2012, it was announced that the A340-500s would be acquired by Airbus and would see the cessation of such non-stop flights in 2013.

=== Historical fleet ===
Singapore Airlines historical fleet
Aircraft	Total	Introduced	Retired	Replacement	Notes/references
Aérospatiale–BAC Concorde	1	1977	1980	None	Operated solely with British Airways flight crews. Co-operated with Singapore Airlines and British Airways cabin crews, and dually marketed by both airlines. Painted in Singapore Airlines' colours on the left side but never registered under a Singaporean operational certificate.
Airbus A300B4-200	8	1980	1985	Airbus A310	One leased to Philippine Airlines.
Airbus A310-200	6	1984	2000	Boeing 777-200ER	
Airbus A310-300	17	1987	2005	Boeing 777-200ER	
Airbus A330-300	34	2009	2021	Airbus A350-900; Boeing 787-10	
Airbus A340-300	17	1996	2003	Boeing 777-200ER	Two aircraft never entered service. Sold to Boeing.
Airbus A340-500	5	2003	2013	Airbus A350-900ULR	Operated the world's longest flight from 2004 until retirement in 2013.
Boeing 707-320B	4	1972	1980	Airbus A300B4-200	Transferred from former Malaysia–Singapore Airlines.
Boeing 707-320C	6	1972	1982	Airbus A300B4-200	Transferred from former Malaysia–Singapore Airlines.
Boeing 727-200	6	1977	1985	Airbus A310	
Boeing 737-100	5	1972	1980	Airbus A310	Transferred from former Malaysia–Singapore Airlines.
Boeing 737-300QC	1	1992	1996	None	Converted freighter bearing the Singapore Airlines Cargo branding.
Boeing 737-800	13	2021	2025	Boeing 737 MAX 8	Transferred from former SilkAir.
Boeing 747-200B	19	1973	1994	Boeing 747-400	
Boeing 747-200C/M	1	1991	1992	None	
Boeing 747-200F	3	1992	1995	Boeing 747-400F	
Boeing 747-300	11	1983	2001	Boeing 747-400; Boeing 777-300	
Boeing 747-300M	3	1986	2001	Boeing 747-400; Boeing 777-300	Largest operator of its type along with KLM and Swissair.
Boeing 747-400	43	1989	2012	Airbus A380-800; Boeing 777-300ER	One, registered as 9V-SPK, crashed as Flight 006.
Boeing 757-200	4	1984	1990	Airbus A310-300	
Boeing 777-200ER	46	1997	2021	Airbus A350-900; Boeing 787-10	
Boeing 777-300	12	1998	2021	Airbus A350-900; Boeing 787-10	
McDonnell Douglas DC-10-30	7	1978	1983	Boeing 747-300	
McDonnell Douglas DC-10-30CF	1	1979	1979	None	Leased from Martinair.
