= Boulevard Hotel =

Former hotel in Orchard, Singapore

- Boulevard Hotel in the mid to late 1980s
- Interactive map of the Boulevard Hotel area
- Former names: Cuscaden House Hotel (1968–1974)

General information
- Location: 28 Cuscaden Road, Singapore 249723
- Coordinates: 1.3048°N 103.8264°E
- Opening: 1968; 58 years ago (as Cuscaden House)
- Closed: 30 April 2000; 26 years ago

Other information
- Number of rooms: 210

Boulevard Hotel was a hotel on Orchard Boulevard in the Orchard Planning Area in Singapore. Opened on Cuscaden Road in 1968 as the Cuscaden House Hotel, it closed down in 1974 before being acquired by Hotel Malaysia Limited, who reopened it as the Hotel Malaysia in 1976. In 1983, the hotel received an extension, after which its main entrance was shifted to Orchard Boulevard. It was also renamed the Boulevard Hotel. The hotel closed down in 2000 before being demolished to make way for a condominium complex.

== History ==
The Cuscaden House Hotel, owned by the Singapore Land Group, was opened on Cuscaden Road in early 1968. In November of that year, it was reported that the hotel had "so far produced some encouraging results", despite having only been in operation for nine months. The hotel's discotheque, The Eye, closed on 31 August 1972. It was the second hotel discotheque to have been closed in the past three months. The hotel was closed on 31 May 1974. In August, it was acquired by Hotel Malaysia Limited, a subsidiary of the Goodwood Group, for $14 million. The company announced there were plans were made to renovate the building for $5 million to $6 million, after which it would be reopened in February of the next year as the Connaught Hotel. The renovations would increase the number of rooms to a total of 300. However, it was announced in June 1975 that the renovations had been "temporarily shelved" as a result of "problems in planning."

In February 1976, Hotel Malaysia Limited announced that the hotel would reopen in the next few months under the name Hotel Malaysia after minor renovations at the hotel were completed. It reopened in April as a "tourist class" hotel. At its reopening, it featured 210 rooms, a 24-hour coffee house, a "restaurant-cocktail lounge-bar", a conference room and a swimming pool. The hotel's La Ronde restaurant received a lightly positive review from Violet Oon of the New Nation in January 1977, who wrote: "As for the food, it is high quality but just misses hitting the top class mark through attention to detail. In fact, this can be said of the restaurant too." Margaret Chan of The Straits Times wrote a positive review of the restaurant in November 1982, giving it a rating of 9/10. She wrote: "For the non-expense wage-earner like me, La Ronde spells an evening of grand eating at affordable prices."

In February 1980, Hotel Malaysia Limited received the approval of the local authorities for a $63 million extension hotel. The 16-storey tall extension, which was to be completed by July 1984, would add an additional 371 rooms to the hotel, making it the largest hotel to be owned by the Goodwood Group. As the extension was to be built behind the existing hotel, its main entrance would be shifted from Cuscaden Road to Orchard Boulevard, making it the only hotel to face that street. Local company Building and Engineering Enterprises was awarded the contract for the project. The extension was to include a five-storey car park, a 160-seat coffee house, a 140-seat restaurant and a cocktail lounge with a capacity for 90 people. Furninshing of the extension was to cost $20 million while renovations on the original buildings were to cost $10 million. The extension was to feature an interior designed by Israeli designer Dora Gad, who produced over 500 individual pieces of sculpted aluminium, including the tallest cast aluminium sculpture in Singapore. Placed in the atrium, it was 15-storeys tall and measured 1 sqm. The project was Gad's first in Southeast Asia.

The La Ronde restaurant, as well as the Cocktail Lounge and Residents' Club Bar were to make way for a specialty restaurant. It was estimated that the extension would result in the total number of staff at the hotel to increase from 300 to 700. Each of the rooms in the new extension were to include a kitchenette, a first in Singapore, as well as facilities for making tea and coffee. It was also to feature a health centre, two swimming pools and 10 food and beverage outlets. The newly renovated hotel was to be a four-star hotel. It was renamed the Boulevard Hotel Singapore on 15 October 1983, prior to the extension's completion as the previous name was "not an established one." The extension was opened in August 1984, featuring a coffee house, a cocktail lounge, a shopping gallery, function and conference rooms, a centre for businessmen, an exclusive lounge and a fitness centre. In March 1985, the hotel spent over $500,000 on the installation of a computer system for its front and back office operations.

The Goodwood Group put the hotel up for sale in February 1997, with an asking price of $550-600 million, claiming that the hotel "generates a gross operating profit of about $16 million a year." The Straits Times noted that several developers interested in the property "balked" at the "steep" price. In March, the asking price was lowered to $450 million. The site was acquired for $410 million in the following month by the Hong Leong Group, who announced that they intended to redevelopment the building into "prestigious condominiums or a hotel or a combination of the two." In September 1998, the company announced that while it had received approval from the local authorities to rezone the site for "permanent residential use", the hotel would remain open for the next two years at least. The hotel closed down at the end of April 2000, after which it was demolished to make way for the condominium complex Cuscaden Residences.
