= All Nippon Airways =

Airline of Japan

All Nippon Airways Co., Ltd. 全日本空輸株式会社 Zen Nippon Kūyu Kabushiki-gaisha

- An All Nippon Airways Boeing 787-9
IATA	ICAO	Call sign
NH	ANA	ALL NIPPON
- Founded: 27 December 1952; 73 years ago (as Japan Helicopter and Aeroplane)
- Commenced operations: February 1953; 73 years ago (as Japan Helicopter and Aeroplane); December 1957; 68 years ago (as All Nippon Airways)
- Hubs: Tokyo–Haneda; Tokyo–Narita
- Secondary hubs: Osaka–Itami; Osaka–Kansai
- Focus cities: Fukuoka; Nagoya–Centrair; Naha; Sapporo–Chitose
- Frequent-flyer program: ANA Mileage Club
- Alliance: Star Alliance
- Subsidiaries: ANA Wings; Air Japan; Nippon Cargo Airlines; Peach Aviation
- Fleet size: 259
- Destinations: 92
- Parent company: ANA Holdings Inc.
- Traded as: ANA Holdings Inc.: TYO: 9202; LSE: ANAA; Nikkei 225 component (9202); TOPIX Large70 component (9202)
- Headquarters: Shiodome City Center, Minato, Tokyo, Japan
- Key people: Shinya Katanozaka (chairman, ANA Holdings); Koji Shibata (ANA chairman & ANA Holdings president & CEO); Shinichi Inoue (ANA president & CEO)
- Revenue: ▲¥1.020 trillion (2022)
- Operating income: ▲¥−29.090 billion (2022)
- Net income: ▲¥−142.239 billion (2022)
- Total assets: ▲¥3.218 trillion (2022)
- Total equity: ▼¥803.415 billion (2022)
- Employees: ▼42,196 (2022)
- Website: ana.co.jp

All Nippon Airways (ANA) is a Japanese airline headquartered in Minato, Tokyo. ANA operates services to over 100 both domestic and international destinations with its main hub at Haneda and Narita, both airports located in Tokyo. It is Japan's largest airline, ahead of its main rival Japan Airlines. As of March 2024, the airline has approximately 12,800 employees. The airline joined as a Star Alliance member in October 1999.

In addition to its mainline operations, ANA controls several subsidiary passenger carriers, such as its regional airline ANA Wings, Air Nippon, Air Do (a low-cost carrier operating scheduled service between Tokyo and cities in Hokkaido), Air Japan and Allex Cargo (ANA Cargo – the freighter division operated by Air Japan). Peach Aviation, a low-cost carrier based in Japan, is fully owned by ANA.

== History ==
=== Formation ===
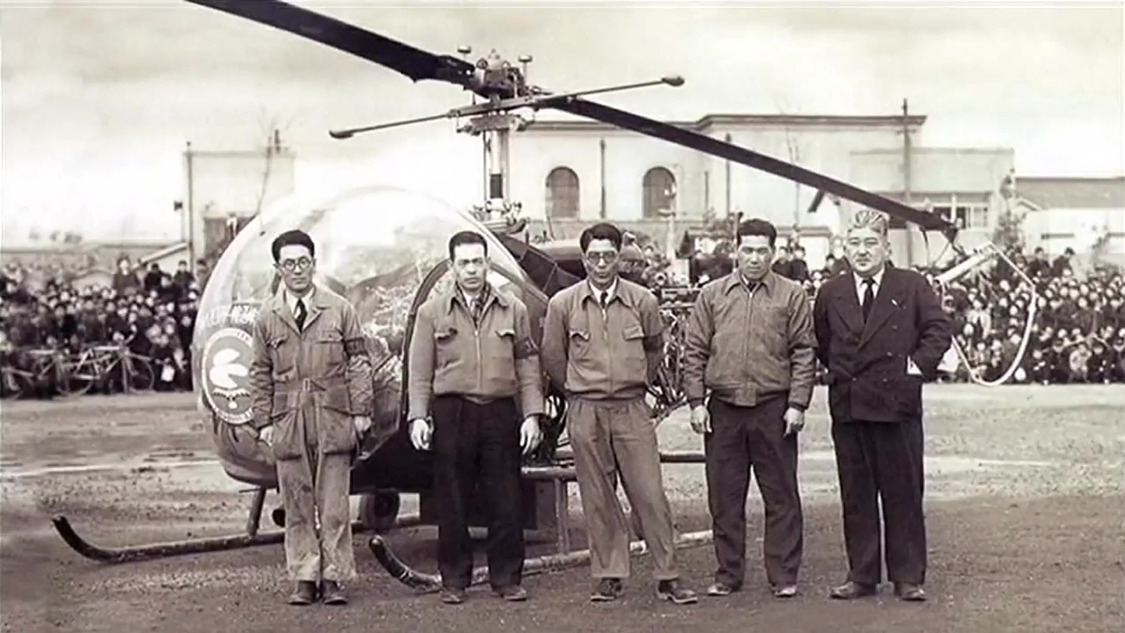
Founders of Japan Helicopter and Aeroplane Transports and a Bell 47D-1

ANA's earliest ancestor was Japan Helicopter and Aeroplane Transports Company (日本ヘリコプター輸送, Nippon Herikoputā Yusō) (also known as Nippon Helicopter and Aeroplane), an airline company founded on 27 December 1952. Nippon Helicopter was the source of what would later be ANA's International Air Transport Association (IATA) airline code, NH.

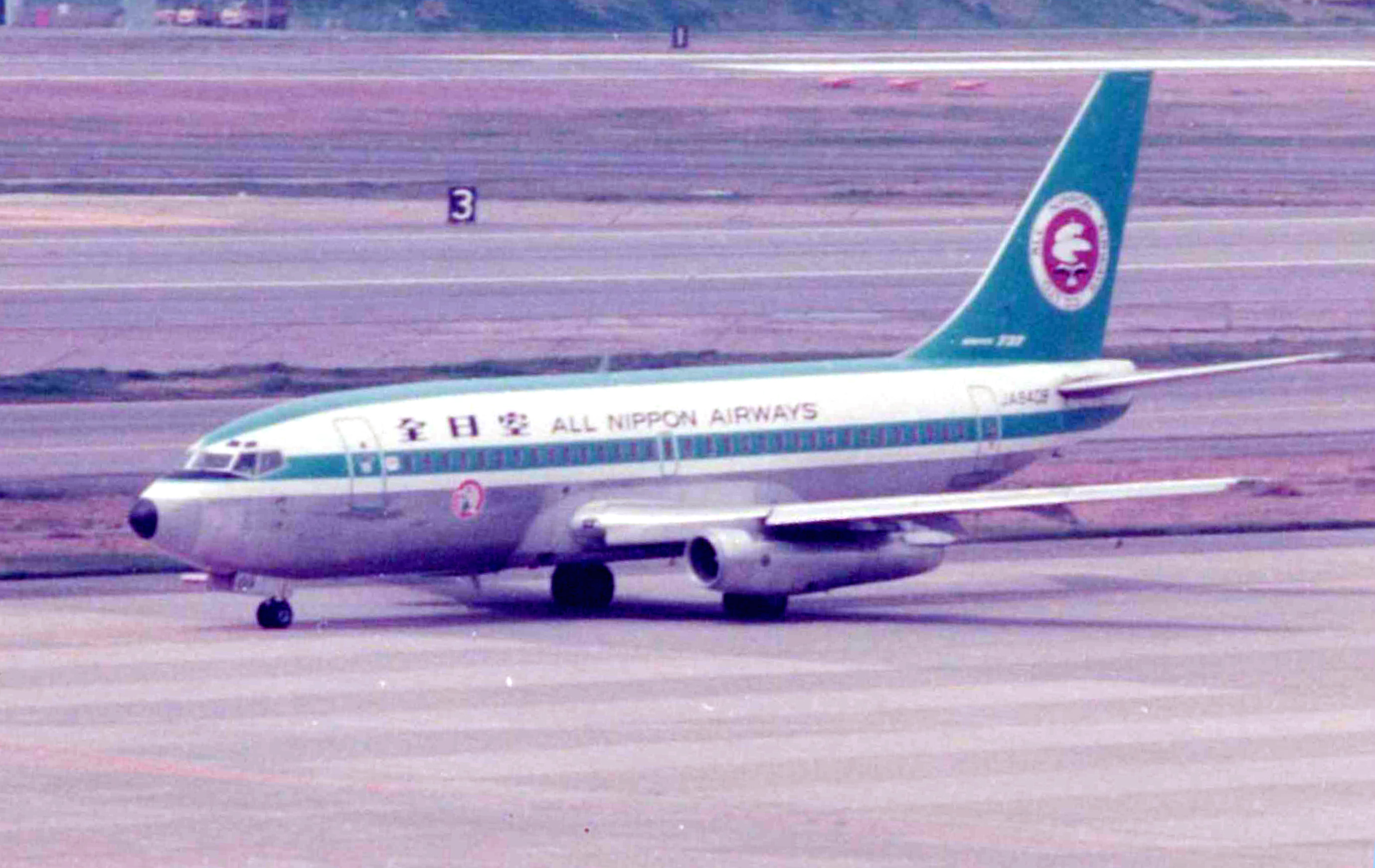
Boeing 737-200 in ANA's 1969–1983 "Mohican Livery"

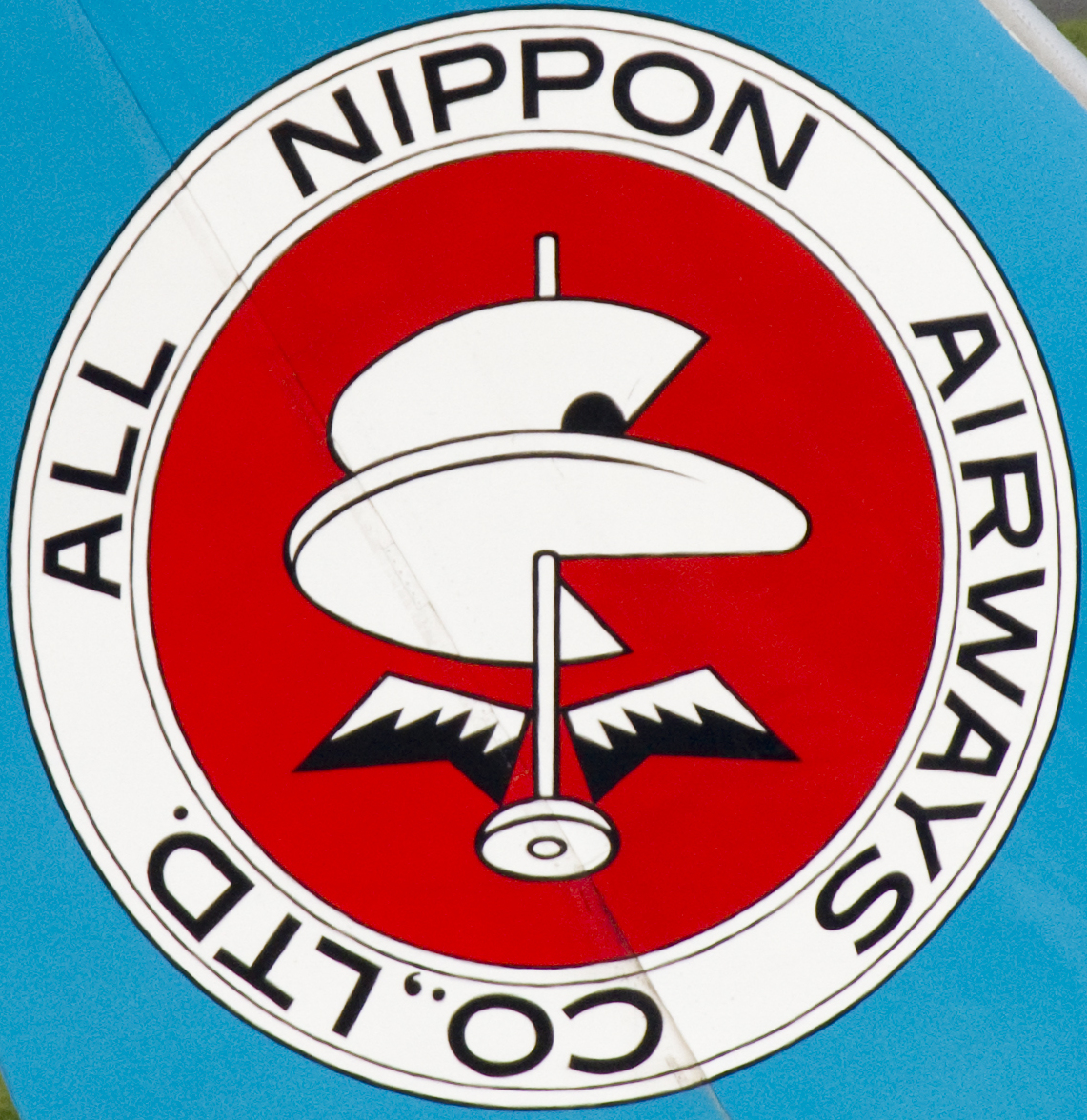
The first NH and ANA logo was inspired by Leonardo da Vinci's aerial screw and was replaced with the current logo in 1982 as a livery logo and in 2012 as a corporate logo

NH began helicopter services in February 1953. On 15 December 1953, it operated its first cargo flight between Osaka and Tokyo using a de Havilland Dove, JA5008. This was the first scheduled flight flown by a Japanese pilot in postwar Japan. Passenger service on the same route began on 1 February 1954, and was upgraded to a de Havilland Heron in March. In 1955, Douglas DC-3s began flying for NH as well, by which time the airline's route network extended from northern Kyūshū to Sapporo. In December 1957 Nippon Helicopter changed its name to All Nippon Airways Company.

ANA's other ancestor was Far East Airlines (極東航空, Kyokutō Kōkū). Although it was founded on 26 December 1952, one day before Nippon Helicopter, it did not begin operations until 20 January 1954, when it began night cargo runs between Osaka and Tokyo, also using a de Havilland Dove. It adopted the DC-3 in early 1957, by which point its route network extended through southern Japan from Tokyo to Kagoshima.

Far East Airlines merged with the newly named All Nippon Airways in March 1958. The combined companies had a total market capitalization of 600 million yen, and became Japan's largest private airline as Japan Airlines was government-owned. The merged airline received a new Japanese name (全日本空輸; Zen Nippon Kūyu; All Japan Air Transport). The new united airline ran a route network that was amalgamated from its two predecessors, and the company logo of the larger NH was chosen to serve as its logo.

=== Domestic era ===
Revenue Passenger-Miles/Kilometers, in millions
Year	Traffic
1964	693 RPMs
1968	1327 RPMs
1970	2727 RPMs
1972	3794 RPMs
1973	8421 RPKs
1975	10513 RPKs
1979	17073 RPKs
1985	18997 RPKs
1990	33007 RPKs
1995	42722 RPKs

ANA grew through the 1960s, adding the Vickers Viscount to the fleet in 1960 and the Fokker F27 in 1961. October 1961 marked ANA's debut on the Tokyo Stock Exchange as well as the Osaka Securities Exchange. 1963 saw another merger, with Fujita Airlines, raising the company's capital to 4.65 billion yen. In 1965 ANA introduced its first jet, the Boeing 727 trijet, on the Tokyo-Sapporo route. Prior to this, the Japan Civil Aviation Bureau denied an import license for ANA's 727s unless Japan Airlines (JAL) acquired their own fleet of 727s. ANA also introduced Japan's first homegrown turboprop airliner, the NAMC YS-11 in 1965, replacing Convair 440s on local routes. In 1969, ANA introduced Boeing 737 services.

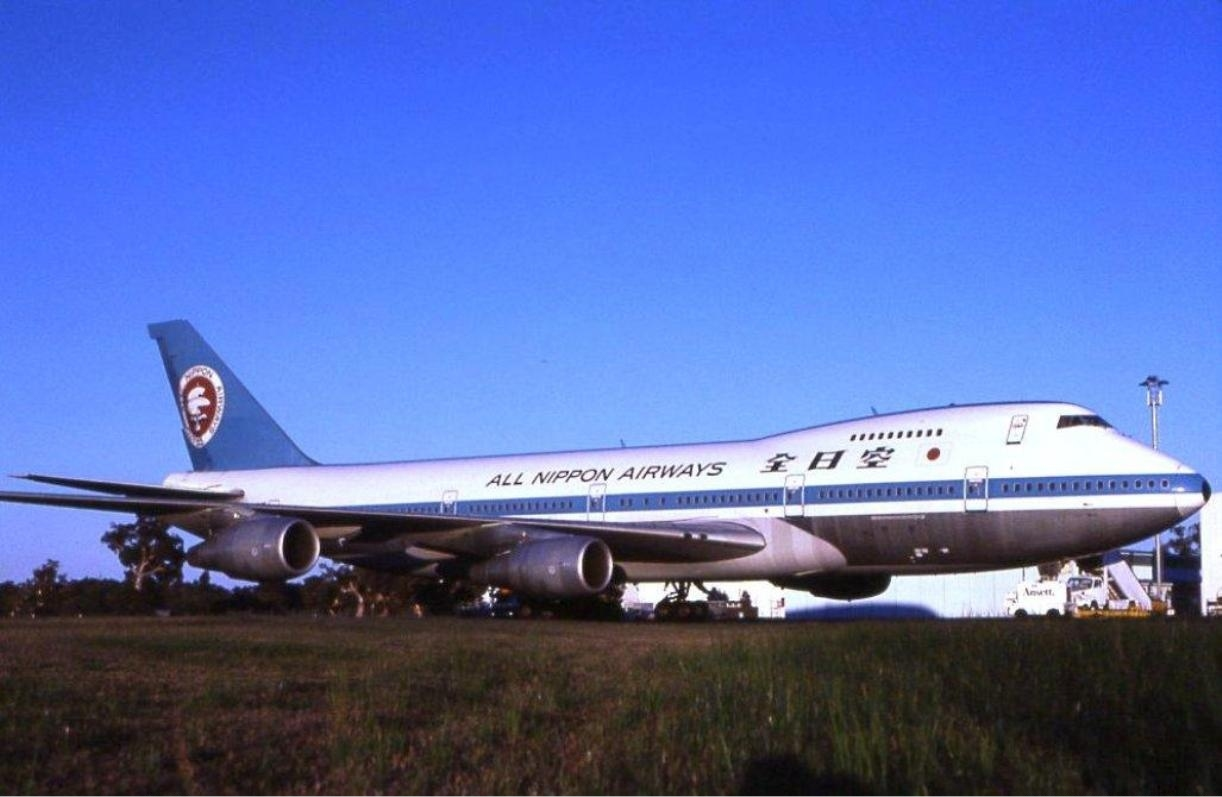
ANA Boeing 747SR-81 at Perth Airport (mid 1980s)

As ANA grew, it started to contract travel companies across Japan to handle ground services in each region. Many of these companies received shares in ANA as part of their deals. Some of these relationships continue today in different forms: for instance, Nagoya Railroad, which handled ANA's operations in the Chūbu region along with other partnerships, maintains a permanent seat on ANA's board of directors. By 1974, ANA had Japan's largest domestic airline network.

While ANA's domestic operations grew, the Ministry of Transport had granted government-owned JAL a monopoly on international scheduled flights that lasted until 1986. ANA was allowed to operate international charter flights: its first was a Boeing 727 charter from Tokyo to Hong Kong on 21 February 1971.

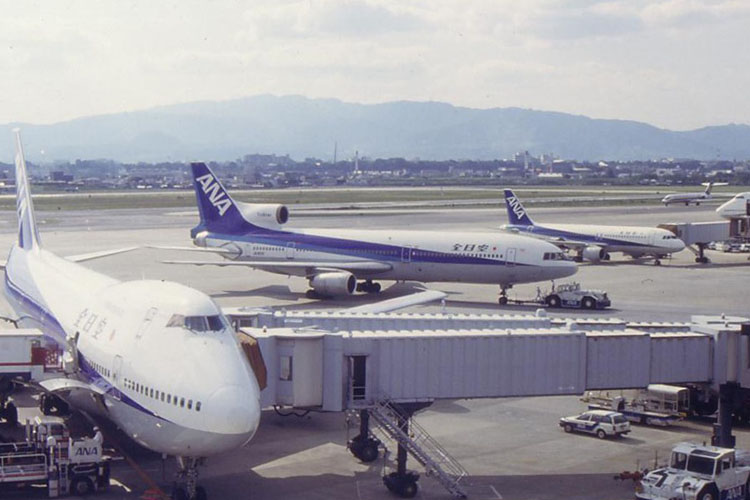
Key ANA fleet types in the early 1990s: Boeing 747SR, Lockheed L-1011-1 TriStar and Airbus A320-200

ANA bought its first widebody aircraft, six Lockheed L-1011s, in November 1971, following a lengthy sales effort by Lockheed which had involved negotiations between US president Richard Nixon, Japanese prime minister Kakuei Tanaka and UK prime minister Edward Heath (lobbying in favor of engine maker Rolls-Royce). Tanaka also pressed Japanese regulators to permit ANA to operate on Asia routes as part of the package. The aircraft entered service on the Tokyo-Okinawa route in 1974. The carrier had ordered McDonnell Douglas DC-10s but cancelled the order at the last minute and switched to Lockheed. It was later revealed that Lockheed had indirectly bribed Prime Minister Kakuei Tanaka to force this switch: the scandal led to the arrest of Tanaka and several managers from ANA and Lockheed sales agent Marubeni for corruption.

Boeing 747s were introduced on the Tokyo-Sapporo and Tokyo-Fukuoka routes in 1976 and Boeing 767s in 1983 on Shikoku routes. The carrier's first 747s were the short-range SR variant, designed for Japanese domestic routes.

=== International era ===
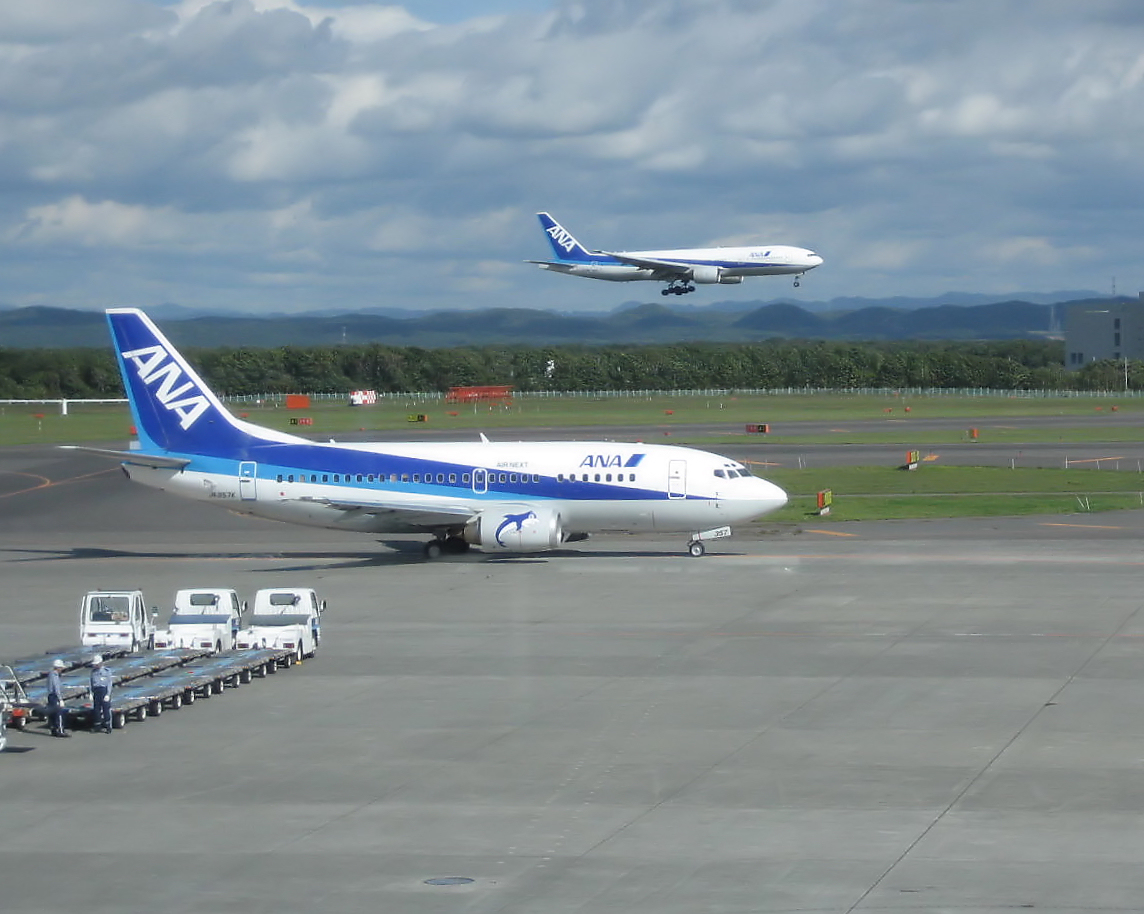
ANA Boeing 737-500 at New Chitose Airport (Chitose). An ANA Boeing 777-200 can be seen on final approach in the background.

In 1986, ANA began to expand beyond Japan's key domestic carrier to become a competitive international carrier as well, breaking Japan Airlines' monopoly as the sole Japanese flag carrier like many other countries in Asia. On 3 March 1986, ANA started scheduled international flights with a passenger service from Tokyo to Guam. Flights to Los Angeles and Washington, D.C., followed by year's end, and ANA also entered a service agreement with American Airlines to feed the US carrier's new flights to Narita.

ANA expanded its international services gradually: to Beijing, Dalian, Hong Kong and Sydney in 1987; to Seoul in 1988; to London and Saipan in 1989; to Paris in 1990 and to New York and Singapore in 1991. Airbus equipment such as the A320 and A321 was added to the fleet in the early 1990s, as was the Boeing 747-400 jet. ANA joined the Star Alliance in October 1999.

In February 2001, to promote the opening of Universal Studios Japan, ANA unveiled the Woody Woodpecker-themed Woody Jet, using the Boeing 767-300, for its domestic flights.

2004 saw ANA's profits exceed JAL's for the first time. That year, facing a surplus of slots due to the construction of new airports and the ongoing expansion of Tokyo International Airport, ANA announced a fleet renewal plan that would replace some of its large aircraft with a greater number of smaller aircraft.

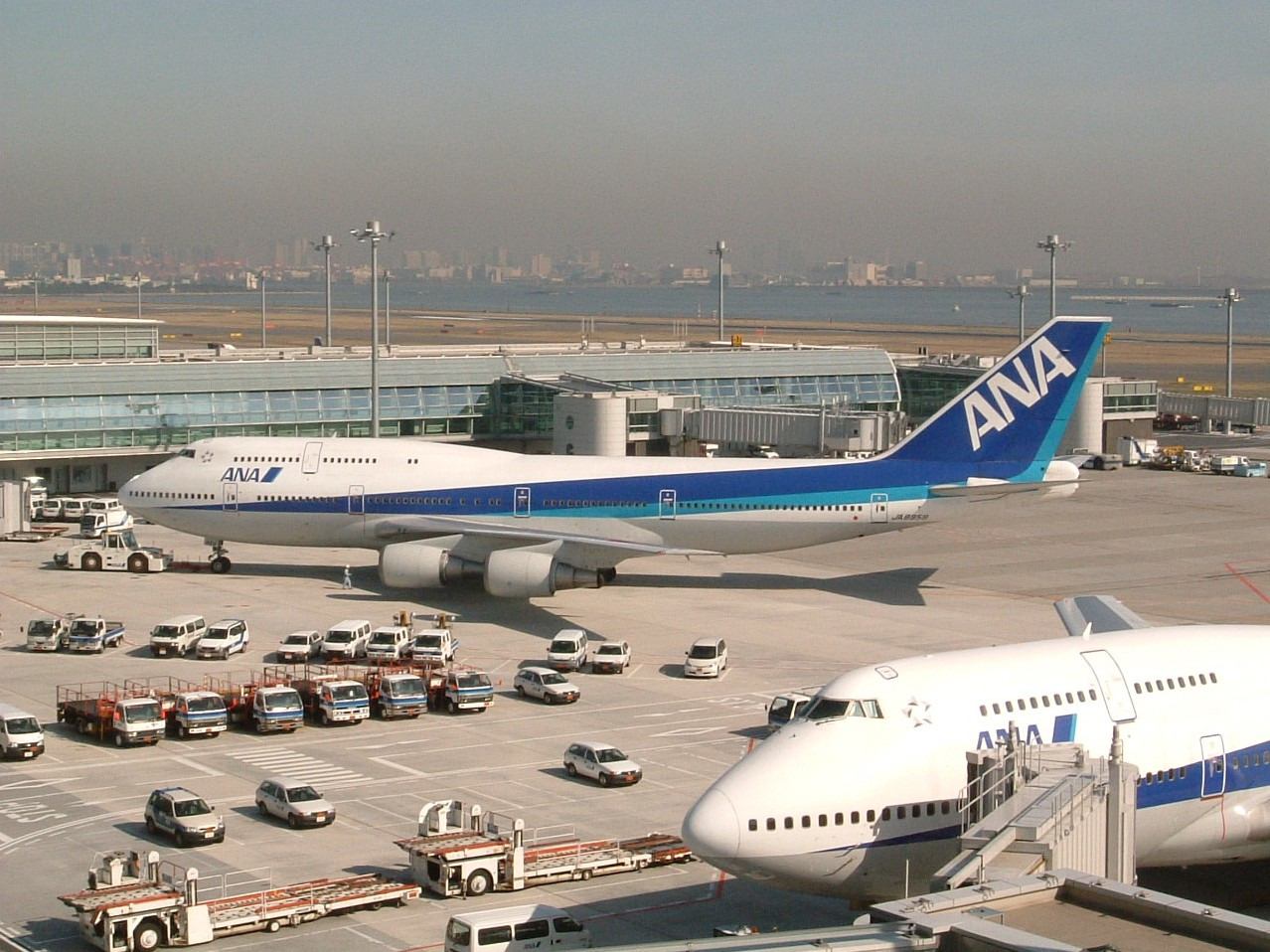
Two ANA Boeing 747-400Ds at Tokyo International Airport (Haneda Airport)

Also in 2004, ANA set up low-cost subsidiary Air Next to operate flights from Fukuoka Airport starting in 2005, and became the majority shareholder in Nakanihon Airline Service (NAL). In 2005, ANA renamed NAL to Air Central, and relocated its headquarters to Nigoya Airport. On 12 July 2005, ANA reached a deal with NYK to sell its 27.6% share in Nippon Cargo Airlines, a joint venture formed between the two companies in 1987. The sale allowed ANA to focus on developing its own cargo division. In 2006, ANA, Japan Post, Nippon Express, and Mitsui O.S.K. Lines founded ANA & JP Express (AJV), which would operate freighters. ANA is the top shareholder of AJV. It absorbed Air Japan's freighter operations.

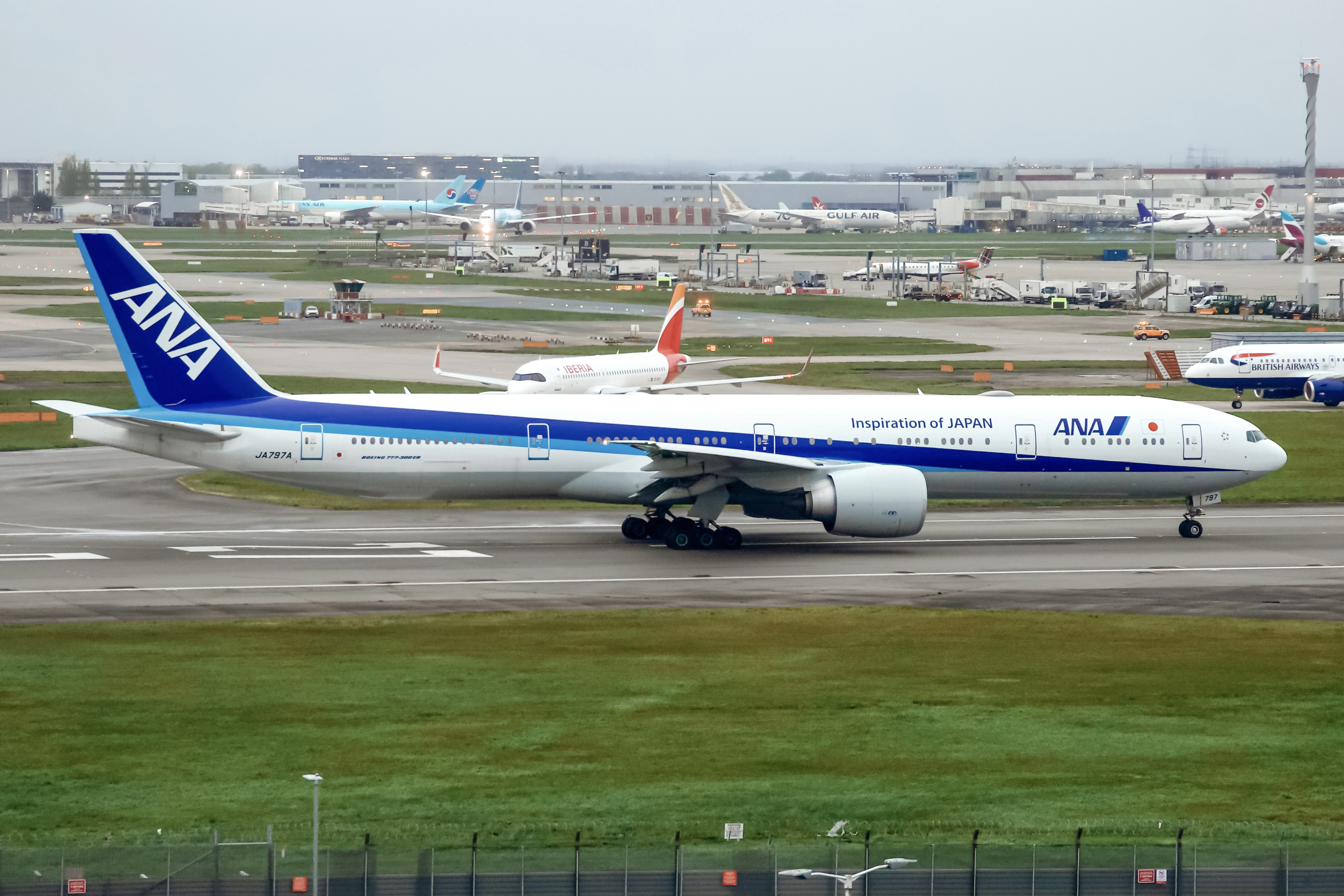
ANA Boeing 777-300ER at London Heathrow Airport with "Inspiration of JAPAN" tagline in 2024

Air Transport World named ANA its 2007 "Airline of the Year". In 2006, the airline was recognized by FlightOnTime.info as the most punctual scheduled airline between London and Tokyo for the last four consecutive years, based on official British statistics. Japan Airlines took over the title in 2007. In 2009, ANA announced plans to test an idea as part of the airline's "e-flight" campaign, encouraging passengers on select flights to visit the airport restroom before they board. On 10 November of the same year, ANA also announced "Inspiration of JAPAN", ANA's newest international flight concept, with redesigned cabins initially launched on its 777-300ER aircraft.

In July 2011, All Nippon Airways and AirAsia agreed to form a low-cost carrier, called AirAsia Japan, based at Tokyo's Narita International Airport. ANA held 51 percent shares and AirAsia held 33 percent voting shares and 16 percent non-voting shares through its wholly owned subsidiary, AA International. The carrier lasted until October 2013, when AirAsia withdrew from the joint venture; the carrier was subsequently rebranded as Vanilla Air.

In March 2018, All Nippon Airways announced the integration of its two low-cost carrier subsidiaries Peach Aviation and Vanilla Air into one entity retaining the Peach name; the integration was completed in October 2019.

On 29 January 2019, ANA Holdings purchased a 9.5% stake in PAL Holdings, Philippine Airlines' parent company, for US$95 million. Following PAL's bankruptcy and restructuring in 2021, ANA's stake was reduced to 4.11 percent by May 2023.

== Parent company ==
ANA Holdings Inc. was created in April 2013 due to the "changing landscape of the airline industry", with competition against low cost carriers cited as one of the reasons. The new holding company would have over 70 companies under it, most notably All Nippon Airways, but also low cost subsidiaries such as Peach Aviation, and other catering and ground operations companies. The holding company is led by a separate chairman and CEO.

=== Senior leadership ===
- Chairman: Shinya Katanozaka (since April 2022)
- President and Chief Executive: Koji Shibata (since April 2022)

==== List of former chairmen ====
1. Yoji Ohashi (2013–2015)
2. Shinichiro Ito (2015–2022)

==== List of former presidents and chief executives ====
1. Shinichiro Ito (2013–2015)
2. Shinya Katanozaka (2015–2022)

== Corporate affairs and identity ==
=== President and chief executive officer ===
All Nippon Airways has been led by only a president and CEO since April 2013, when a new parent company was formed. The chairman of All Nippon Airways became the chairman of the holding company, and All Nippon Airways ceased to have its own chairman. The following is a list of presidents and CEOs, along with the year of their appointment:

1. Masuichi Midoro – 1952
2. Kaheita Okazaki – 1961
3. Isamu Morimura – 1967
4. Tetsuo Oba – 1969
5. Tokuji Wakasa – 1970
6. Masamichi Anzai – 1976
7. Taizo Nakamura – 1983
8. Akio Kondo – 1987
9. Seiji Fukatsu – 1993
10. Kichisaburo Nomura – 1997
11. Yoji Ohashi – 2001
12. Mineo Yamamoto – 2005
13. Shinichiro Ito – 2009
14. Osamu Shinobe – 2013
15. Yuji Hirako – 2017
16. Shinichi Inoue – 2022 (current)

=== Headquarters ===
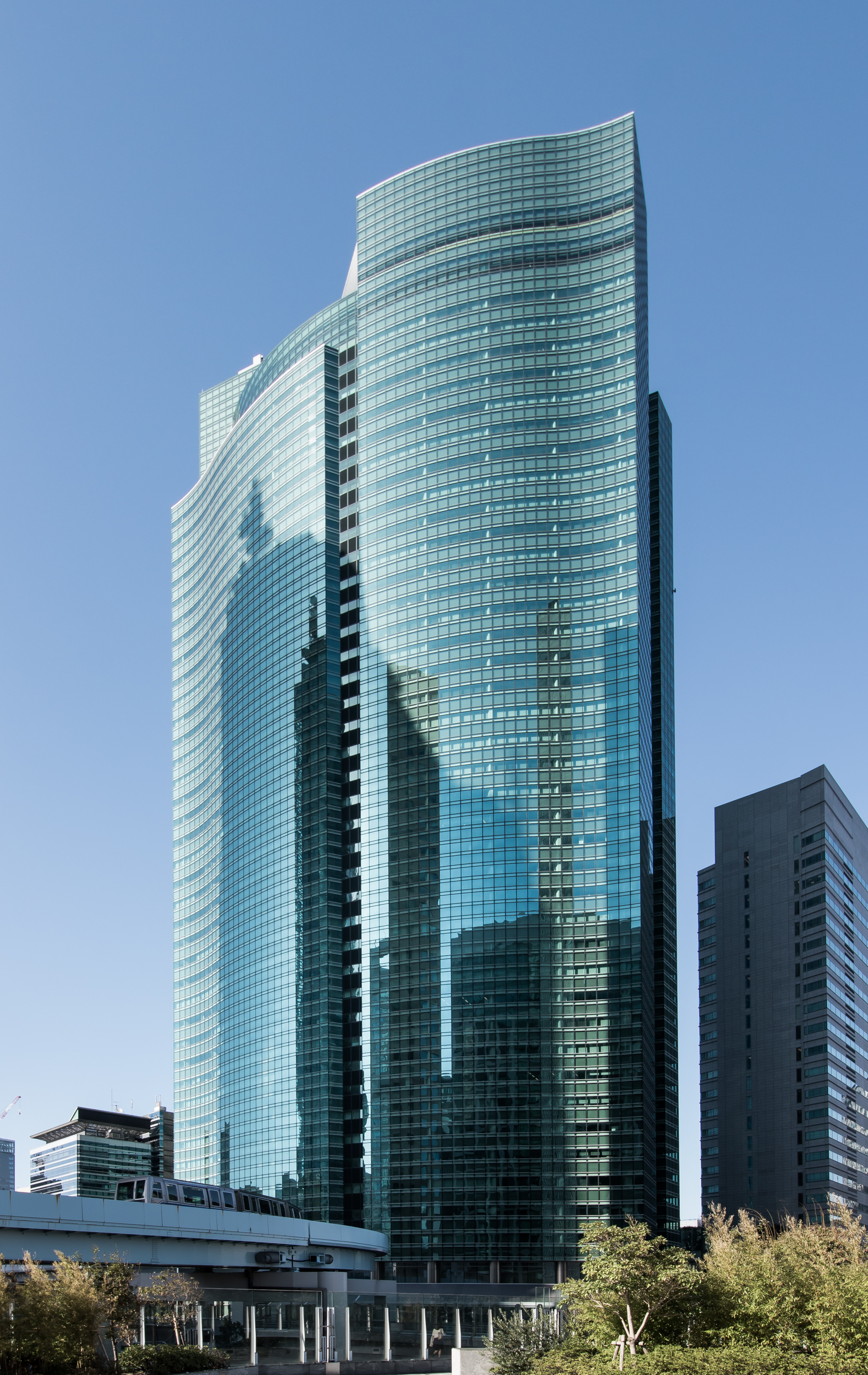
Shiodome City Center in Minato, Tokyo, headquarters of ANA Holdings

All Nippon Airways is headquartered in the Shiodome City Center, located in the Shiodome area of Minato, Tokyo.

In the late 1960s, the airline was based in the Hikokan Building in Shinbashi, Minato. From the 1970s to the late 1990s, ANA's headquarters were in the Kasumigaseki Building in Chiyoda, Tokyo. Prior to relocating to its current site, the company was headquartered on the grounds of Tokyo International Airport in Ōta, Tokyo. In 2002, ANA announced plans to occupy up to ten floors in the under-construction Shiodome City Center and to relocate some subsidiaries there. The building opened in 2003, becoming ANA's new headquarters.

=== Subsidiaries ===
ANA Group Companies and the companies a part of whose stocks are held by ANA Holdings

ANA Group is a group of companies which are wholly or primarily owned by ANA. It comprises the following:

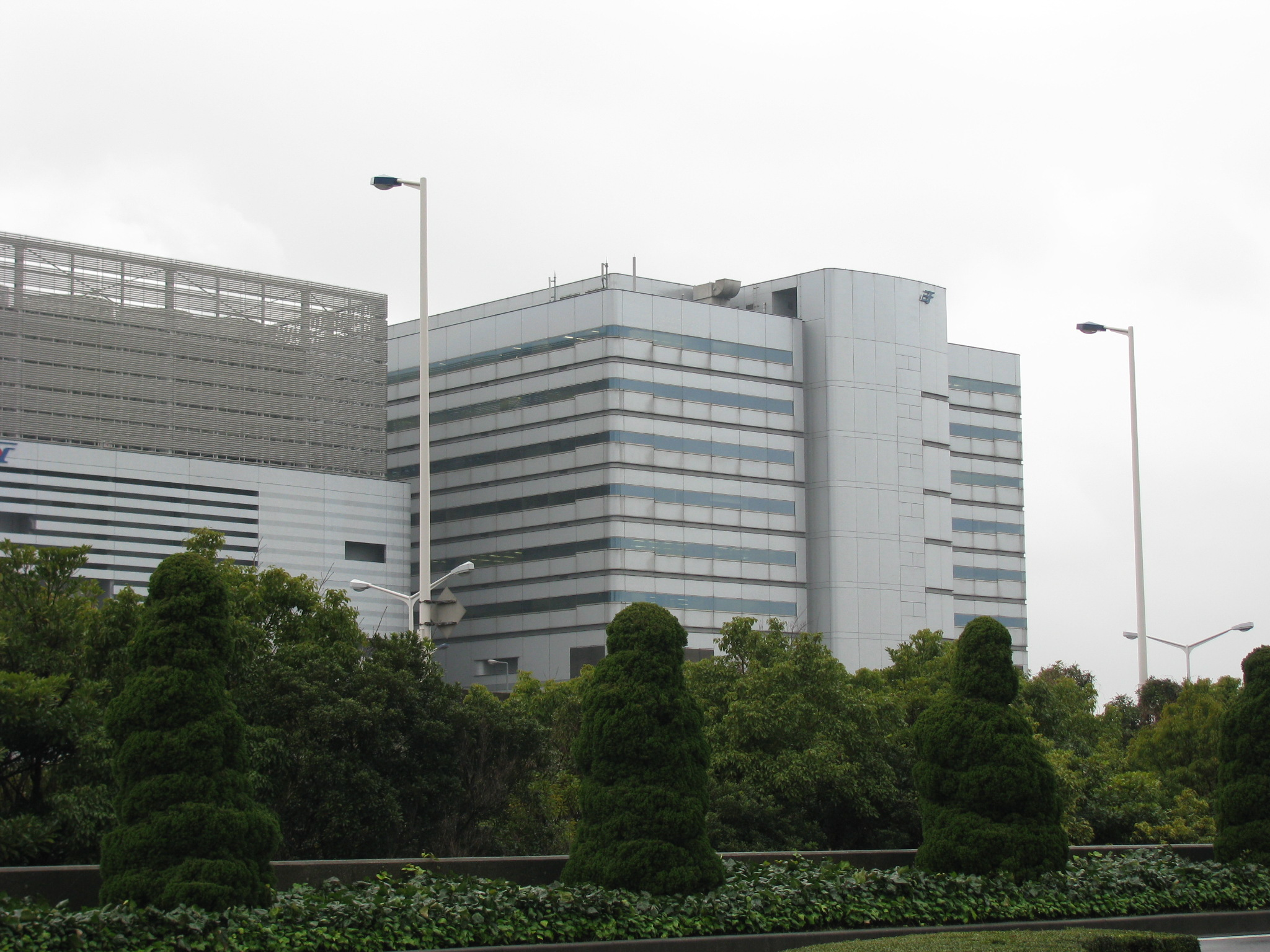
The Utility Center building, the former headquarters of ANA at Tokyo International Airport

Commercial aviation

- Air Japan
- ANA Wings
- Air Do (major shareholder)
- Nippon Cargo Airlines
- Peach (wholly-owned)
- Philippine Airlines (4% shareholder)
- Vietnam Airlines (5.62% shareholder)
- IFTA (Flight Training Academy training pilots for ANA Group airlines and other worldwide airlines by contract)
- Pan Am Flight Academy

General aviation

- All Nippon Helicopter (dedicated for the public broadcaster NHK)

Hotels

- IHG ANA Hotels Group Japan (minority stake)

Discontinued

- AirAsia Japan (folded into Peach Aviation)
- Air Hokkaido (80% shareholding, ceased operations on 31 March 2006)
- Allex Cargo (merged into Air Japan)
- Vanilla Air (merged into Peach Aviation)

The following airlines merged into ANA Wings on 1 October 2010.

- Air Nippon
- Air Nippon Network
- Air Next
- Air Central

=== Cargo services ===
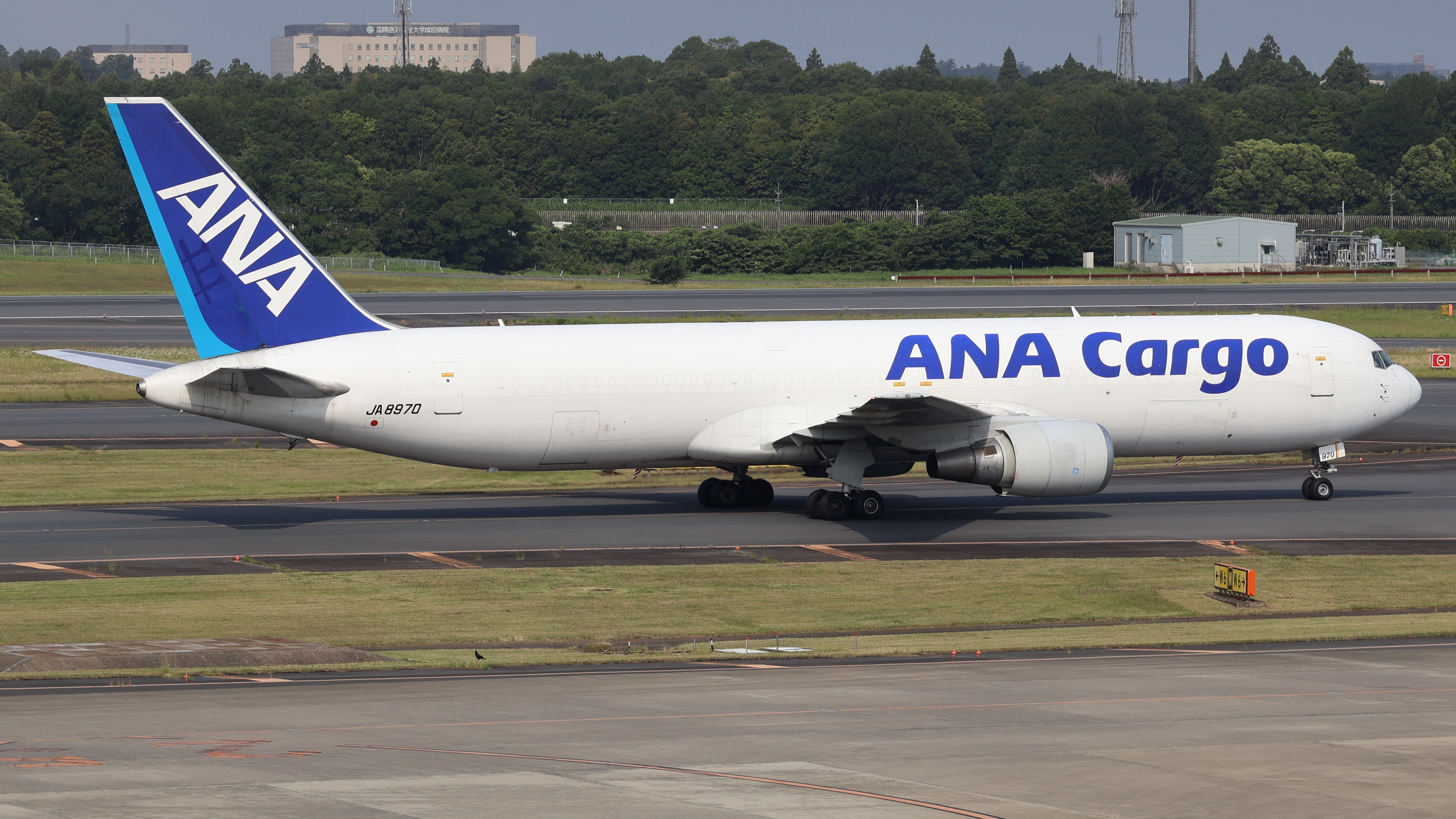
An ANA Cargo Boeing 767-300BCF taxiing at Narita International Airport

As of July 2025, ANA operated a fleet of eight freighter aircraft, including two Boeing 767-300(BCF), four Boeing 767-300F and two Boeing 777F aircraft. ANA's freighters operate on 18 international routes and 6 domestic routes. ANA operates an overnight cargo hub at Naha Airport in Okinawa, which receives inbound freighter flights from key destinations in Japan, China and Southeast Asia between 1 and 4 a.m., followed by return flights between 4 and 6 a.m., allowing overnight service between these regional hubs as well as onward connections to other ANA and partner carrier flights. The 767 freighters also operate daytime flights from Narita and Kansai to various destinations in East and Southeast Asia. ANA also operates a 767 freighter on an overnight Kansai-Haneda-Saga-Kansai route on weeknights, which is used by overnight delivery services to send parcels to and from destinations in Kyushu.

ANA established a 767 freighter operation in 2006 through a JV with Japan Post, Nippon Express and Mitsui, called ANA & JP Express. ANA announced a second freighter joint venture called Allex in 2008, with Kintetsu World Express, Nippon Express, MOL Logistics and Yusen Air & Sea as JV partners. Allex merged with ANA subsidiary Overseas Courier Services (OCS), an overseas periodical distribution company, in 2009, and ANA & JP Express was folded into ANA in 2010.

ANA Cargo and the United States–based United Parcel Service have a cargo alliance and a code-share agreement, similar to an airline alliance, to transport member cargo on UPS Airlines aircraft.

ANA also has a long historical relationship with Nippon Cargo Airlines, a Narita-based operator of Boeing 747 freighters. ANA co-founded NCA with shipping company Nippon Yusen in 1978, and at one time held 27.5% of NCA's stock. ANA sold its stake to NYK in 2005, but retained a technical partnership with NCA. ANA announced in July 2013 that it would charter NCA's 747 freighter aircraft for an overnight cargo run between Narita and Okinawa, doubling capacity between ANA's key cargo hubs and freeing up 767 aircraft to operate new routes from Okinawa to Nagoya and Qingdao.

On 7 March 2023, Nippon Yusen and ANA Holdings announced that ANA would acquire all shares of NCA from Nippon Yusen by 1 October 2023, or a date to be agreed by the two companies. ANA is also considering a future merger of ANA Cargo and NCA. Finally, ANA Cargo is integrating to NCA in 1 April 2027.

== Destinations ==
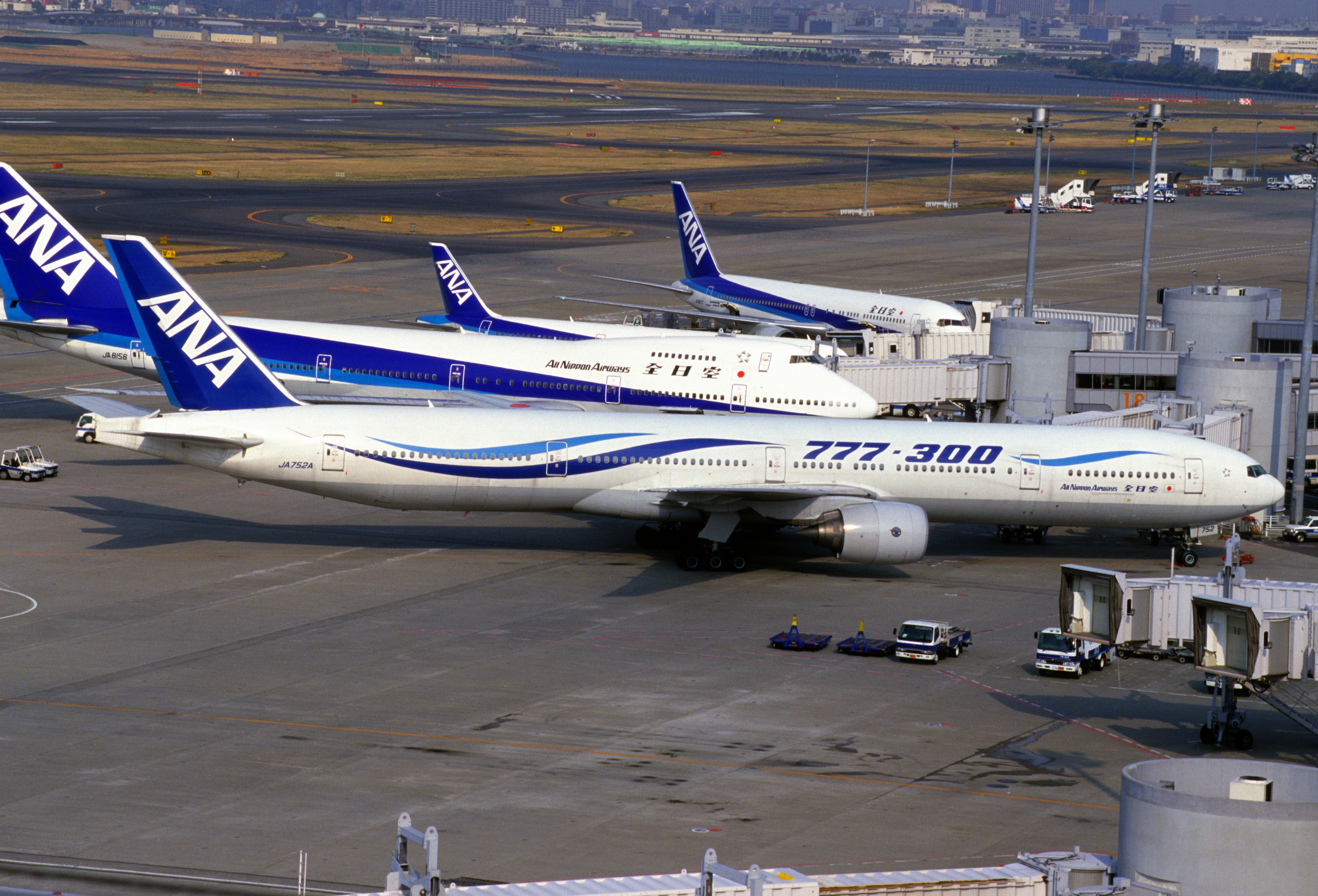
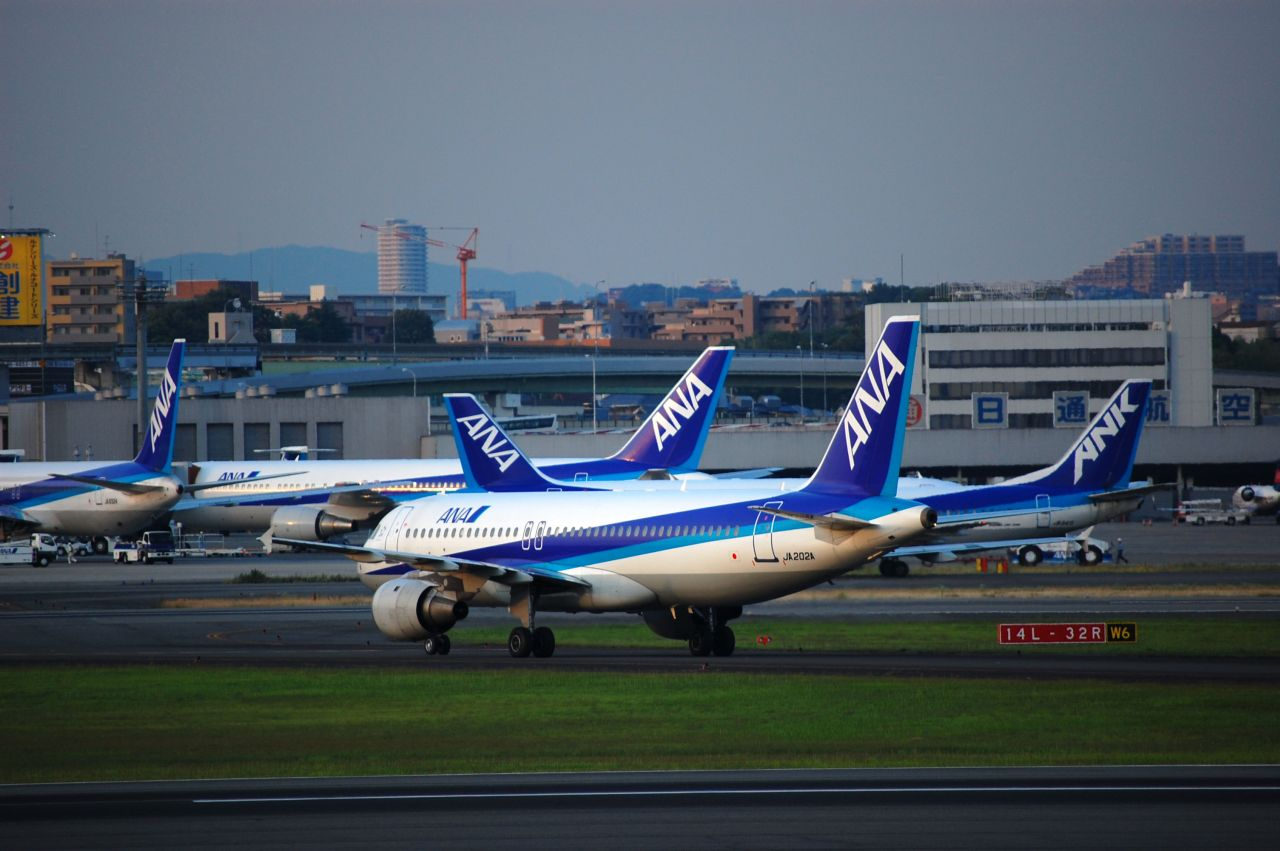
ANA operations at its destinations, Haneda Airport (left) and Itami Airport (right)

ANA has an extensive domestic route network that covers the entirety of Japan, from Hokkaido in the north to Okinawa in the south. ANA's international route network extends through China, Korea, India, Southeast Asia, Canada, United States, Mexico, Australia, and Western Europe. Its key international hub is Narita International Airport, where it shares the South Wing of Terminal 1 with its Star Alliance partners, though Haneda Airport is becoming a major international hub due to its close proximity with downtown Tokyo and the mass expansions occurring there.

ANA's international network currently focuses on business destinations; its only remaining "resort" routes are its routes from Haneda and Narita to Honolulu; past resort routes such as Narita-Guam, Kansai-Honolulu and Nagoya-Honolulu have been cancelled, although ANA plans to expand resort service in the future through its low-cost subsidiary Peach Aviation.

=== Interline agreements ===
All Nippon Airways have interline agreements with the following airline partners:

- Air Astana
- Batik Air Malaysia
- Emirates
- Lao Airlines
- MIAT Mongolian Airlines
- Royal Brunei Airlines
- Southwest Airlines
- Uzbekistan Airways

=== Codeshare agreements ===
All Nippon Airways have codeshare agreements with the following airline partners:

- Aegean Airlines
- Air Canada
- Air China
- Air Do
- Air Dolomiti
- Air India
- Air Macau
- Air New Zealand
- Amakusa Airlines
- Asiana Airlines
- Austrian Airlines
- Avianca
- Brussels Airlines
- Copa Airlines
- Etihad Airways
- Ethiopian Airlines
- Eurowings
- EVA Air
- Ibex Airlines
- ITA Airways
- Japan Air Commuter
- Juneyao Air
- LOT Polish Airlines
- Lufthansa
- Nippon Cargo Airlines (subsidiary)
- Oriental Air Bridge
- Peach (subsidiary)
- Philippine Airlines
- Shandong Airlines
- Shenzhen Airlines
- Singapore Airlines
- Solaseed Air
- South African Airways
- StarFlyer
- Swiss International Air Lines
- TAP Air Portugal
- Thai Airways International
- Turkish Airlines
- United Airlines
- Vietnam Airlines
- Virgin Australia

=== Joint ventures ===
All Nippon Airways have entered into joint ventures with the following airline partners:

- Lufthansa
- Singapore Airlines
- United Airlines

== Fleet ==
=== Current fleet ===
As of July 2026, All Nippon Airways operates the following aircraft:

All Nippon Airways passenger fleet
Aircraft	In service	Orders	Passengers					Notes
Aircraft	In service	Orders	F	J	W	Y	Total	Notes
Airbus A320neo	11	—	—	8	—	138	146	
Airbus A321-200	4	—	—	8	—	186	194	
Airbus A321neo	22	14	—	8	—	186	194	
Airbus A380-800	3	—	8	56	73	383	520	
Boeing 737-800	38	—	—	8	—	158	166	To be replaced by Boeing 737 MAX 8.
Boeing 737-800	38	—	—	8	—	159	167	To be replaced by Boeing 737 MAX 8.
Boeing 737 MAX 8	—	38	TBA					Replacing Boeing 737-800. Deliveries begin 2026.
Boeing 767-300ER	15	—	—	35	—	167	202	International configuration
Boeing 767-300ER	15	—	—	10	—	260	270	Domestic configuration
Boeing 777-200	2	—	—	21	—	384	405	To be replaced by Boeing 787-9.
Boeing 777-200ER	8	—	—	28	—	364	392	
Boeing 777-300	3	—	—	21	—	493	514	To be replaced by Boeing 787-10.
Boeing 777-300ER	13	—	8	68	24	112	212	Older aircraft to be retired and replaced by Boeing 777-9.
Boeing 777-300ER	13	—	8	64	24	116	212	Older aircraft to be retired and replaced by Boeing 777-9.
Boeing 777-9	—	18	TBA					Replacing older Boeing 777-300ER. Two orders converted to Boeing 777-8F.
Boeing 787-8	34	—	—	32	14	138	184	Launch customer. International configuration.
Boeing 787-8	34	—	—	42	—	198	240	Launch customer. International configuration.
Boeing 787-8	34	—	—	12	—	323	335	Domestic configuration
Boeing 787-9	44	27	—	48	21	137	206	International configuration. 206 seat layout introducing from 2026.
Boeing 787-9	44	27	—	48	21	146	215	International configuration. 206 seat layout introducing from 2026.
Boeing 787-9	44	27	—	40	14	192	246	International configuration. 206 seat layout introducing from 2026.
Boeing 787-9	44	27	—	18	—	377	395	Domestic configuration. Replacing Boeing 777-200.
Boeing 787-9	44	27	—	28	—	347	375	Domestic configuration. Replacing Boeing 777-200.
Boeing 787-10	8	6	—	38	21	235	294	International configuration
Boeing 787-10	8	6	—	28	—	401	429	Domestic configuration. Replacing Boeing 777-300.
Embraer 190-E2	—	23	TBA					Deliveries begin 2028.
ANA Cargo fleet
Boeing 767-300BCF	2	—	Cargo					
Boeing 767-300F	4	—	Cargo					
Boeing 777F	2	—	Cargo					
Boeing 777-8F	—	2	Cargo					Converted from Boeing 777-9 orders. Deliveries begin 2028.
Total	259	128						

=== Gallery ===
All Nippon Airways current fleet

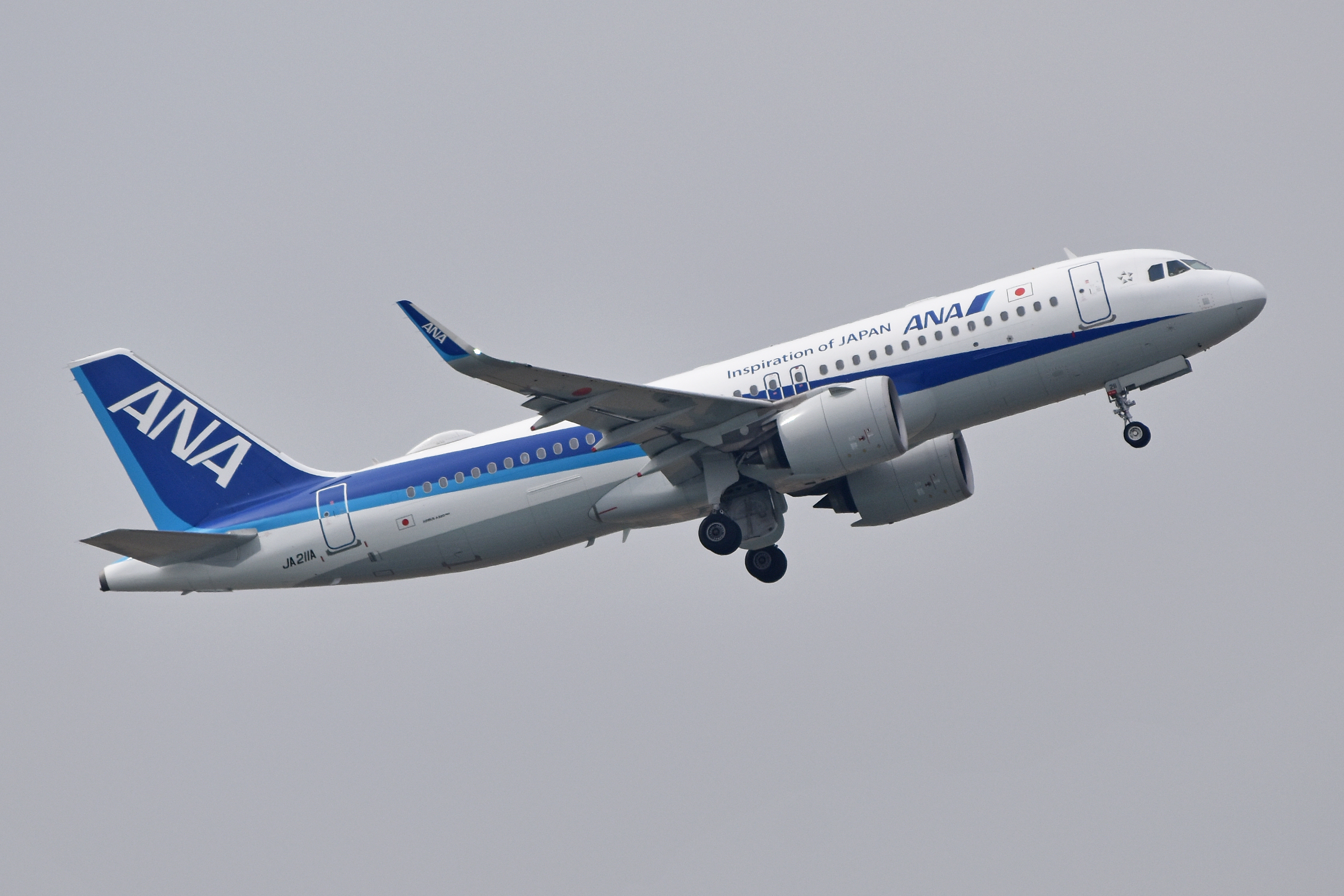
Airbus A320neo

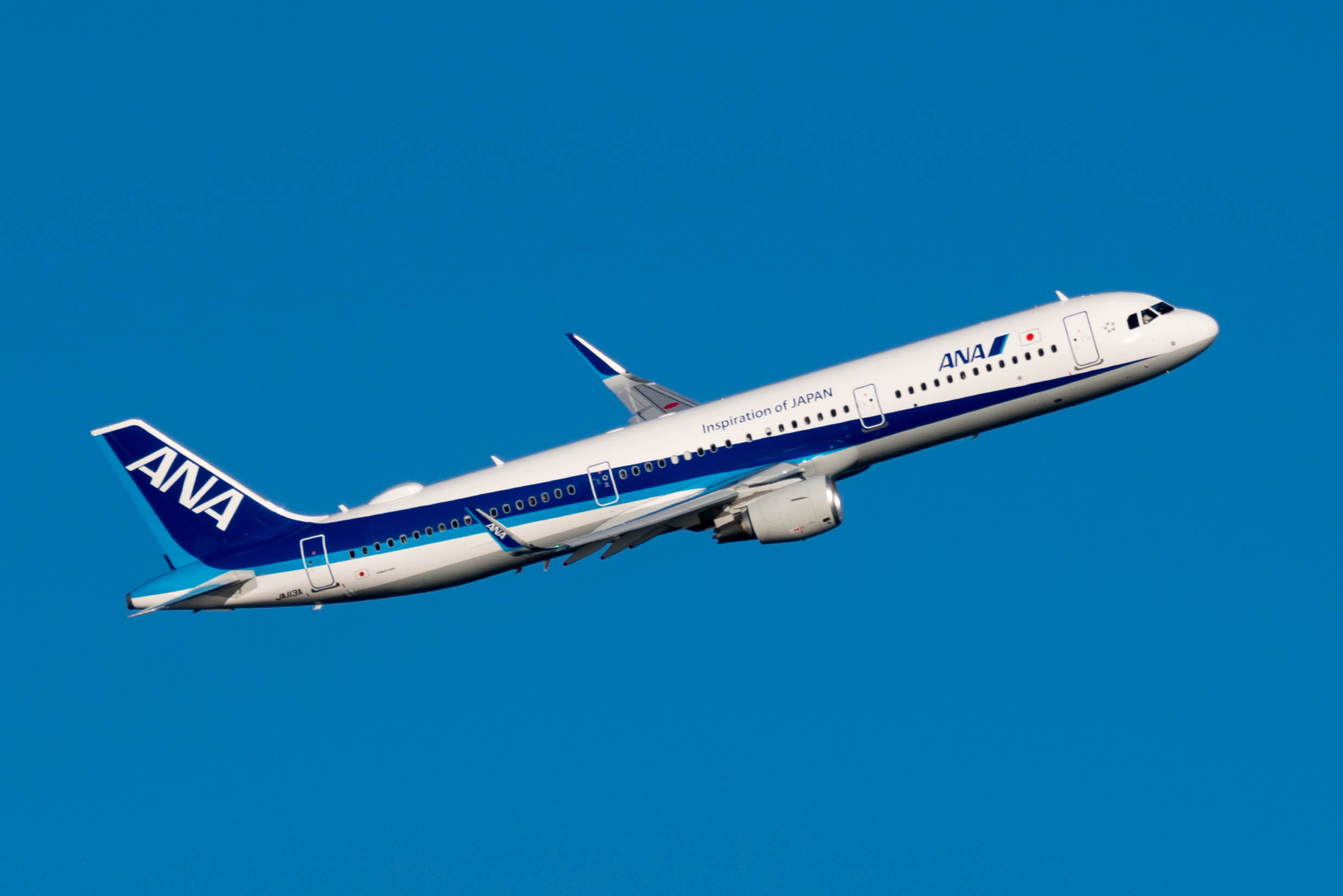
Airbus A321-200

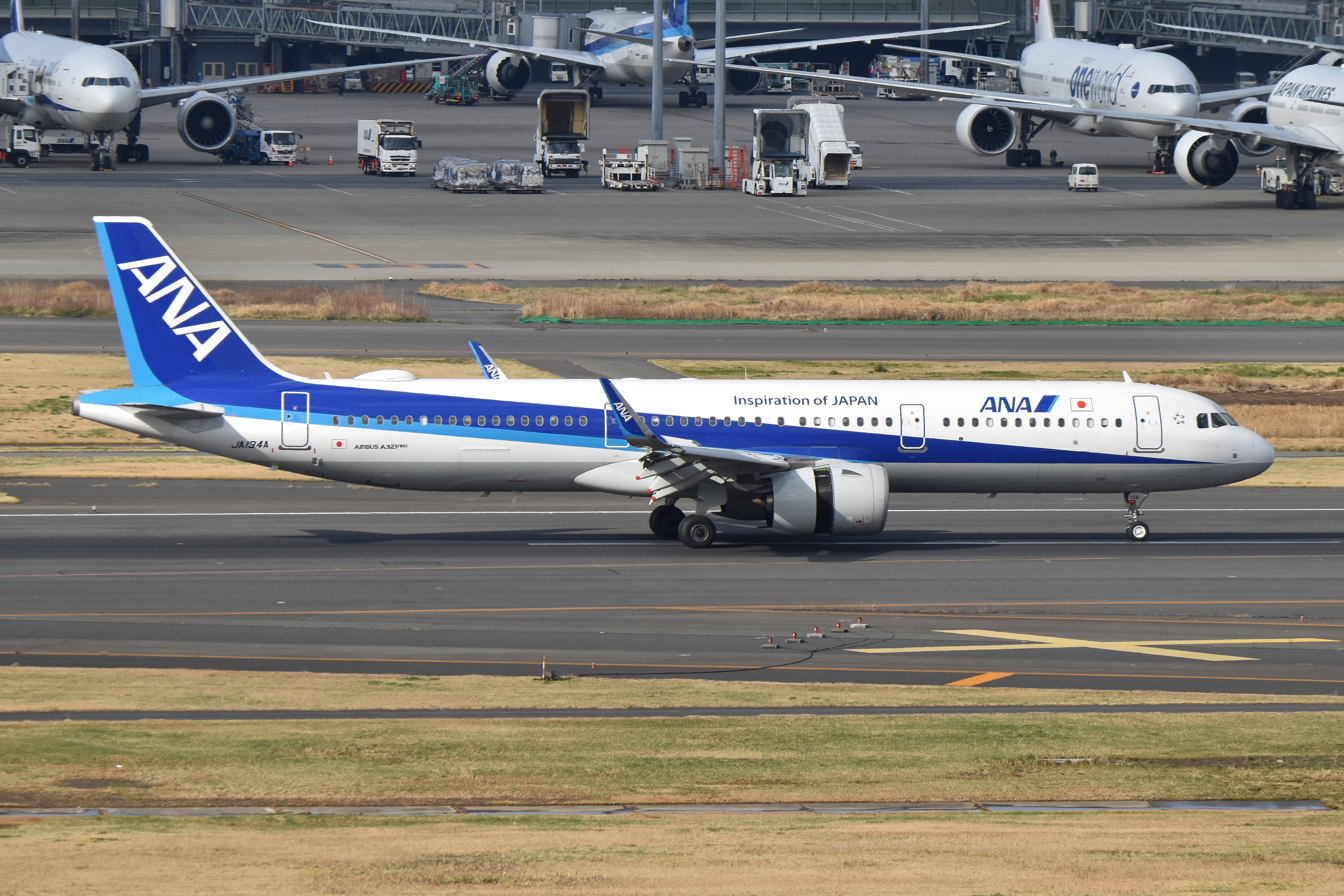
Airbus A321neo

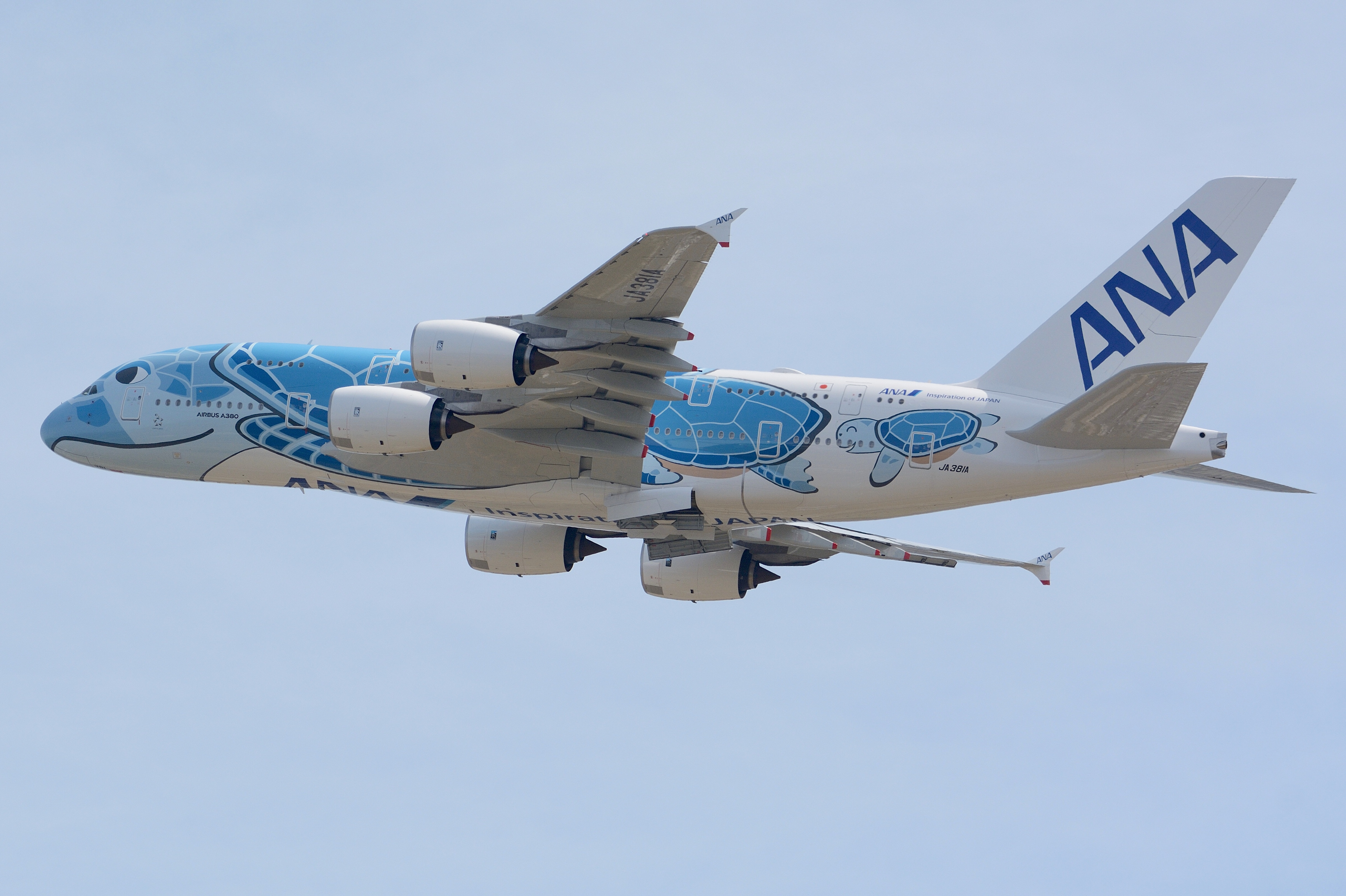
Airbus A380-800

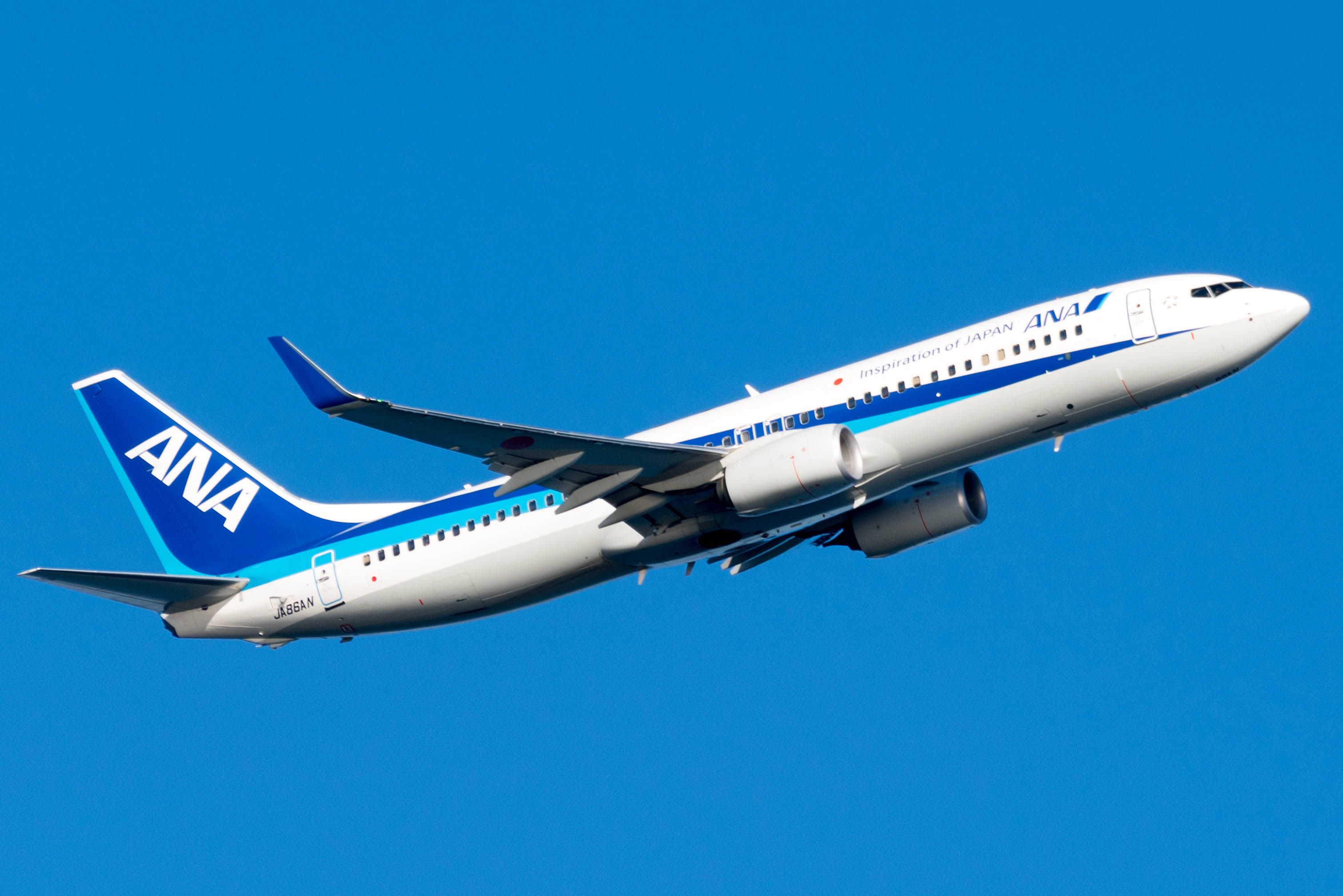
Boeing 737-800

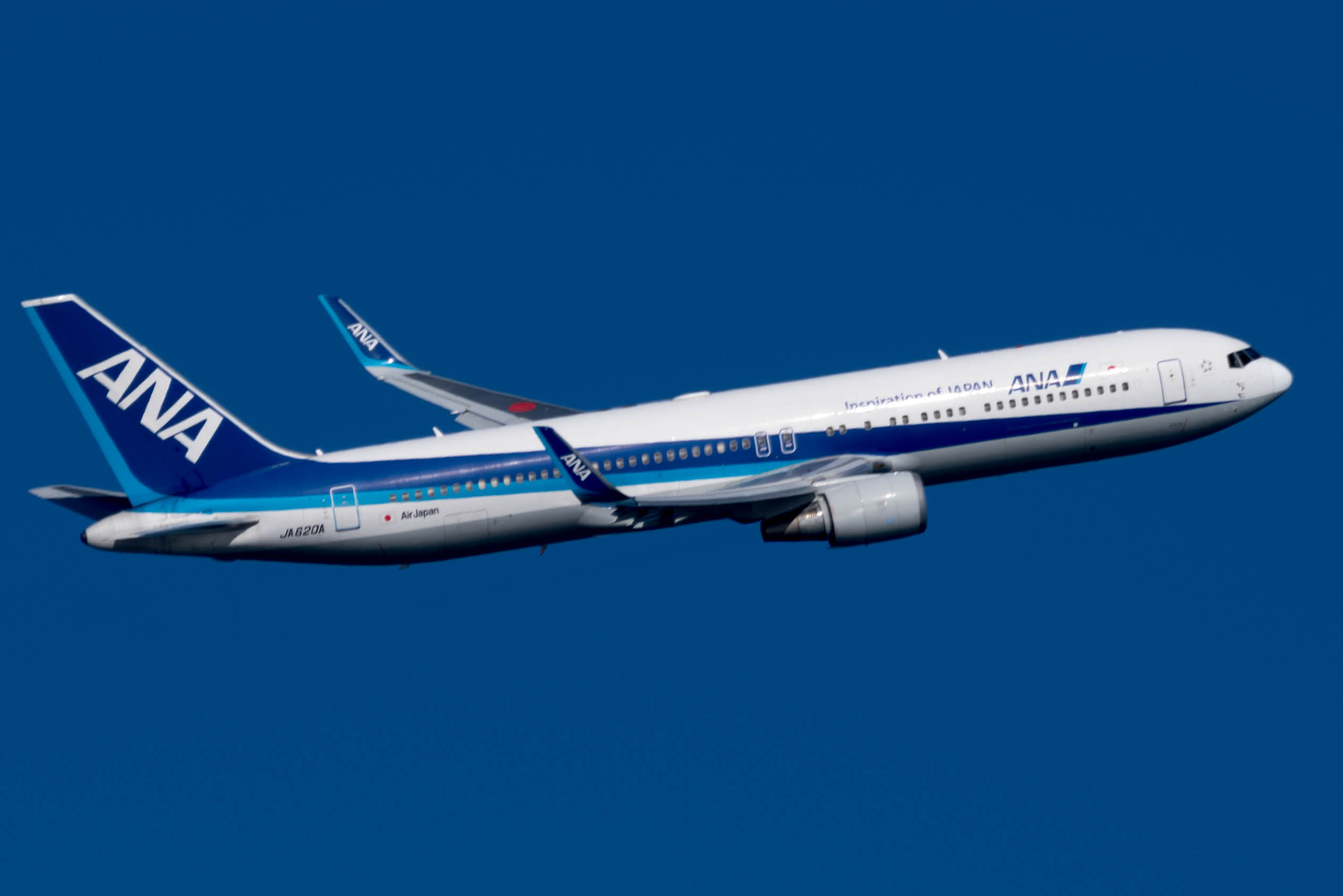
Boeing 767-300ER

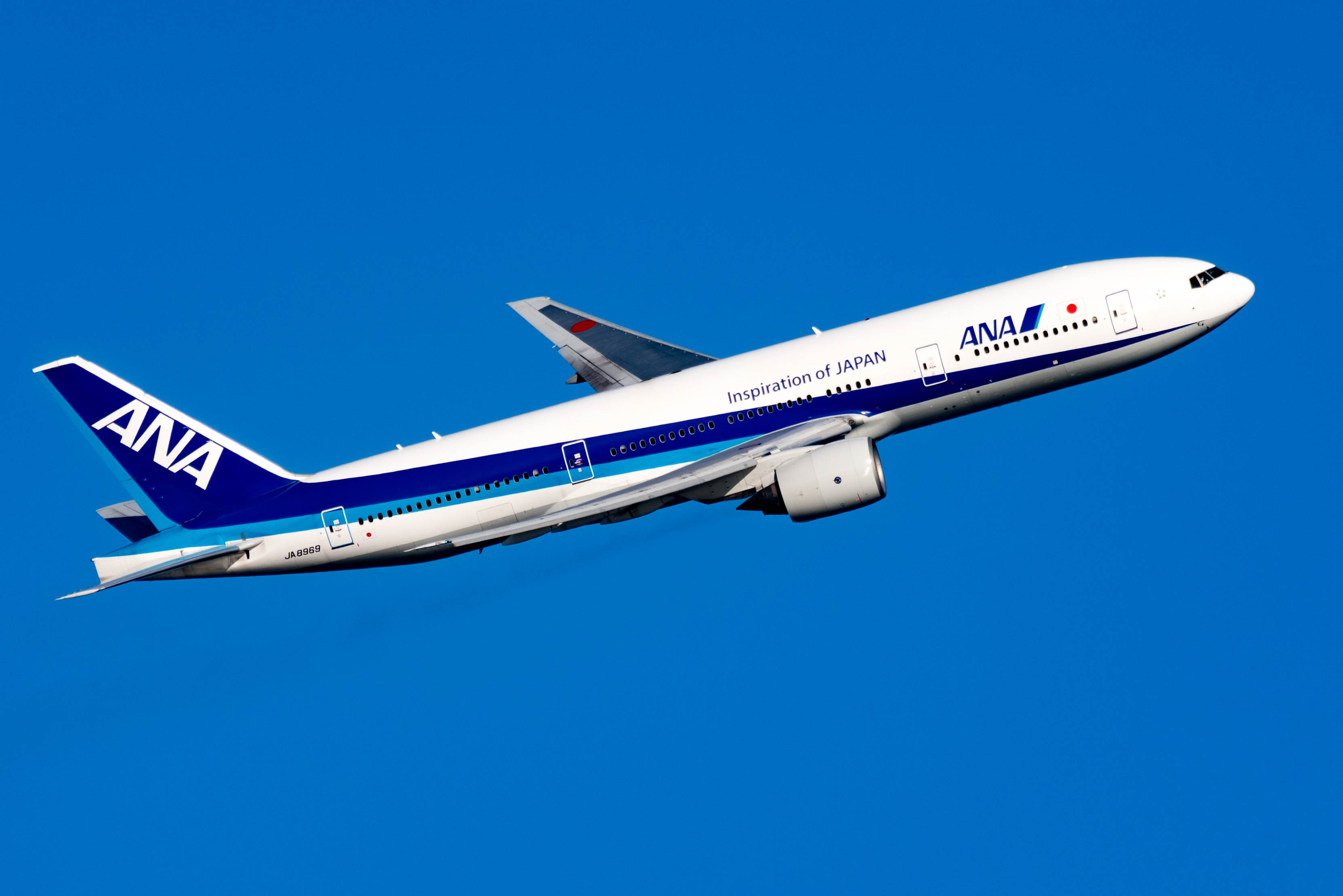
Boeing 777-200

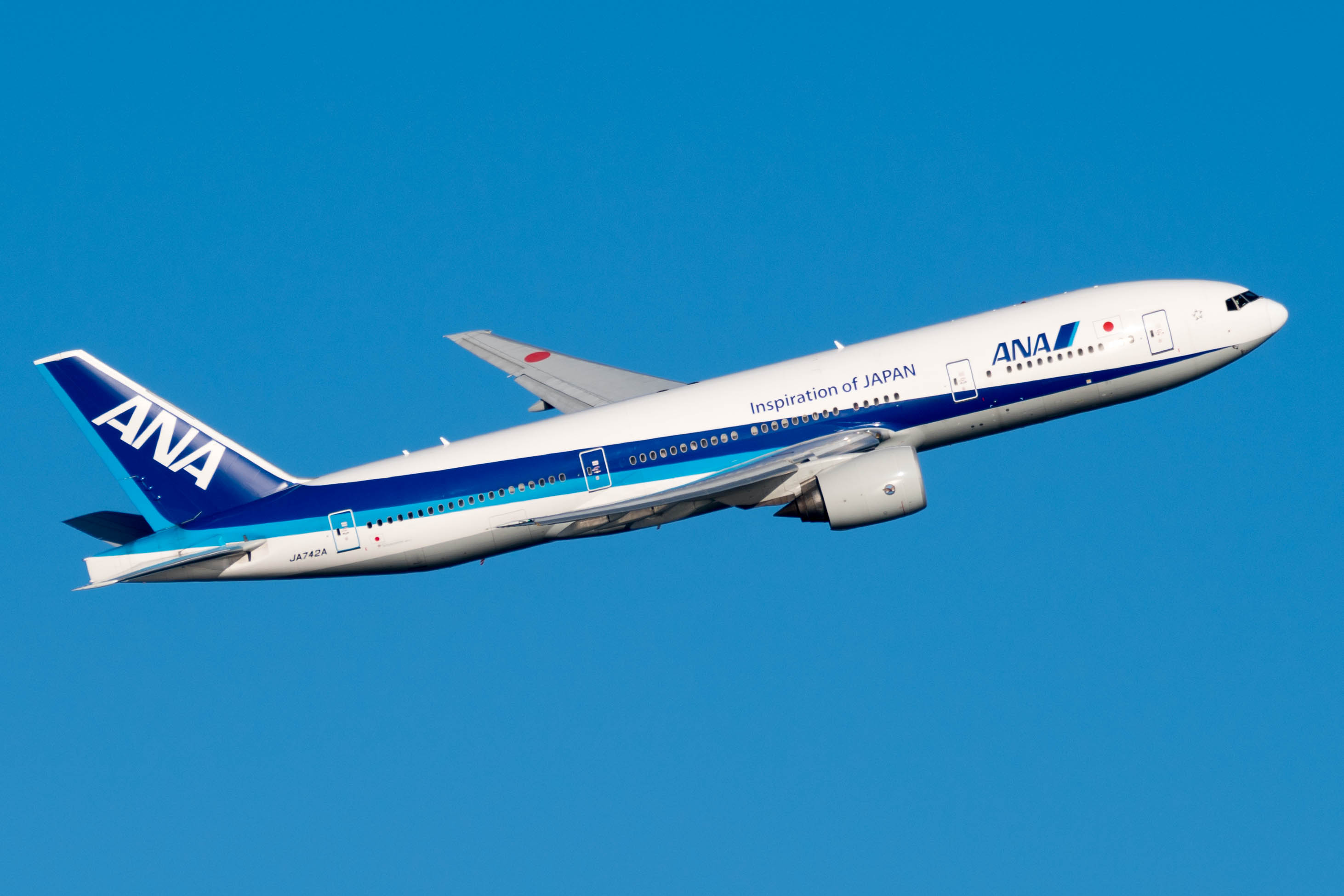
Boeing 777-200ER

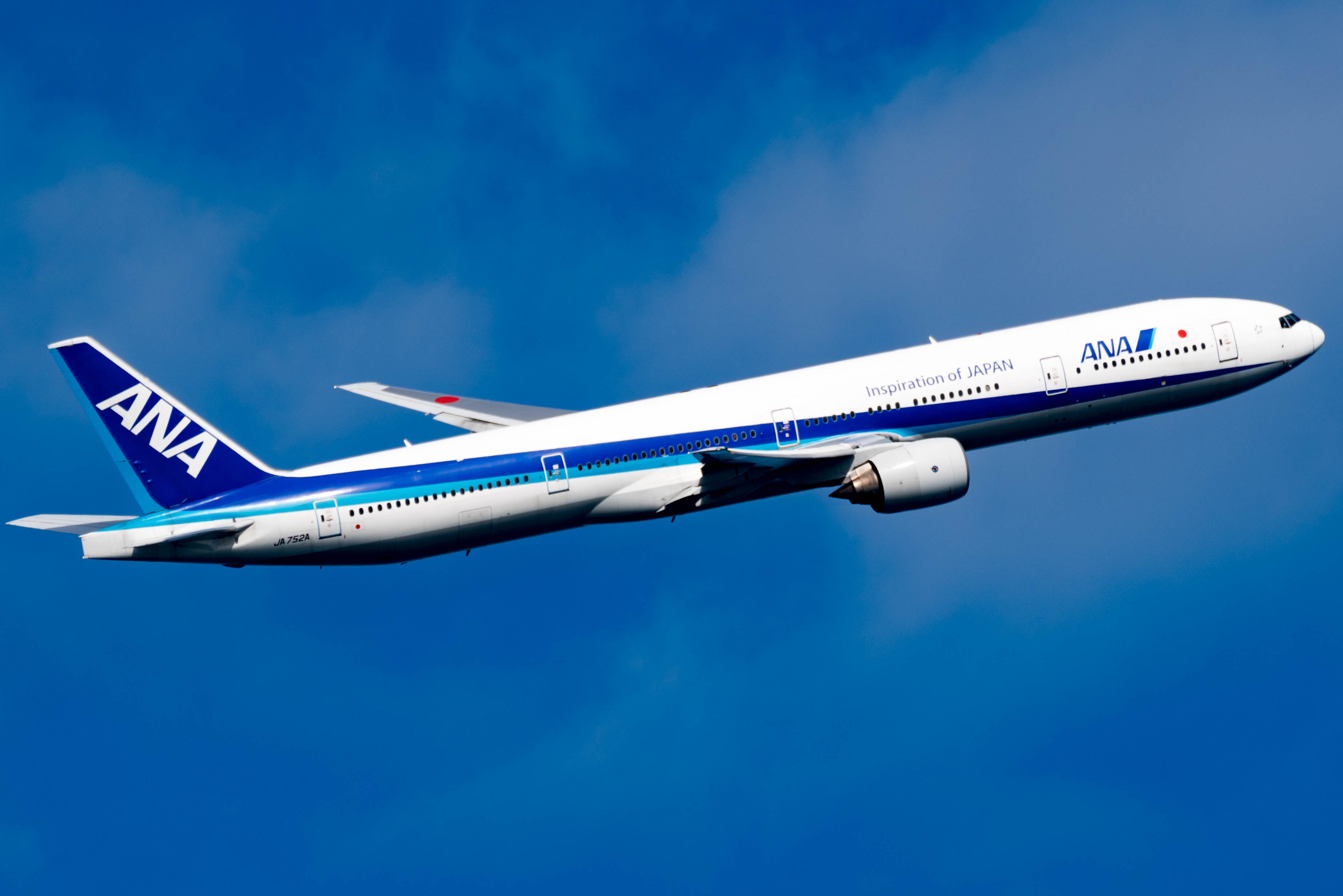
Boeing 777-300

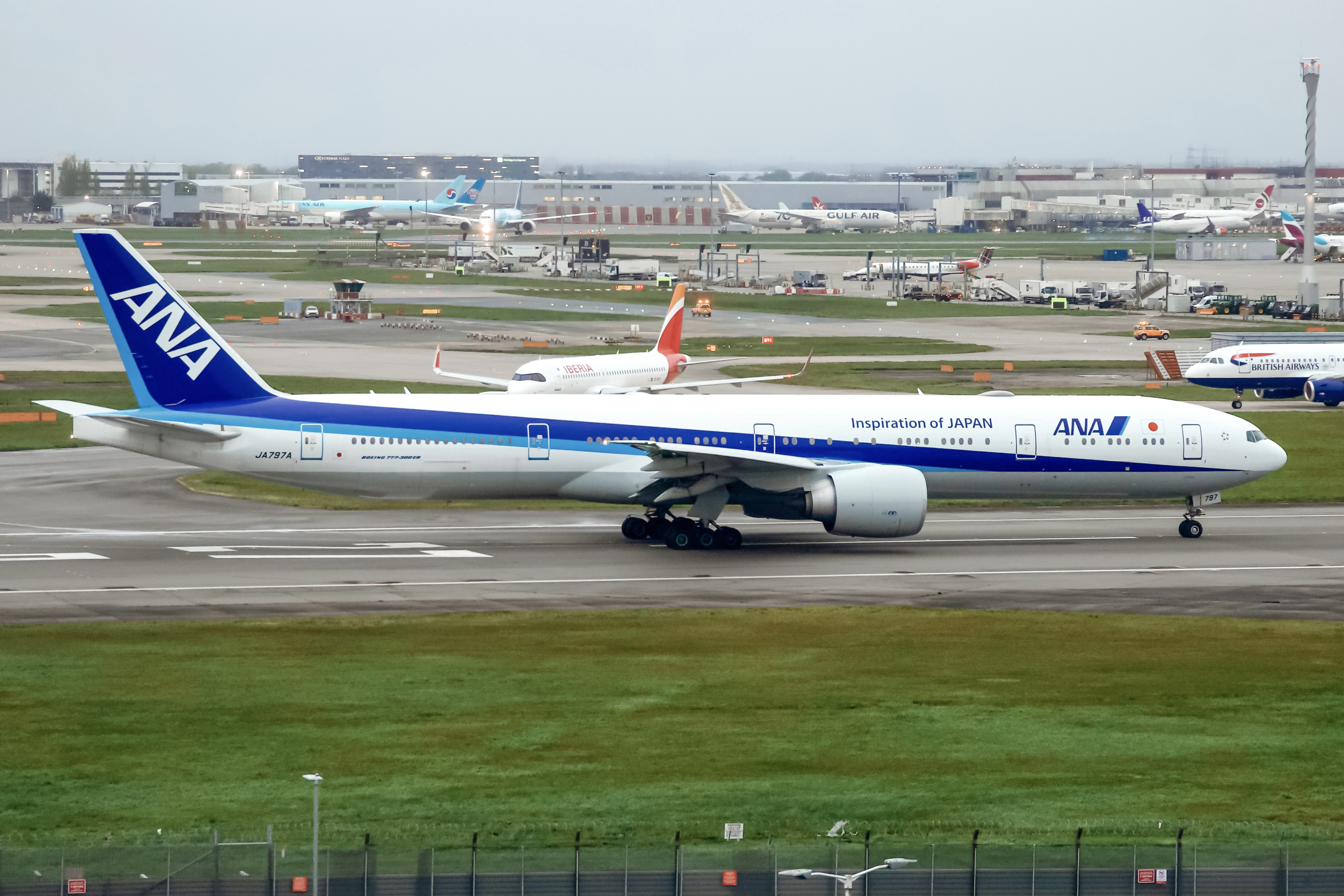
Boeing 777-300ER

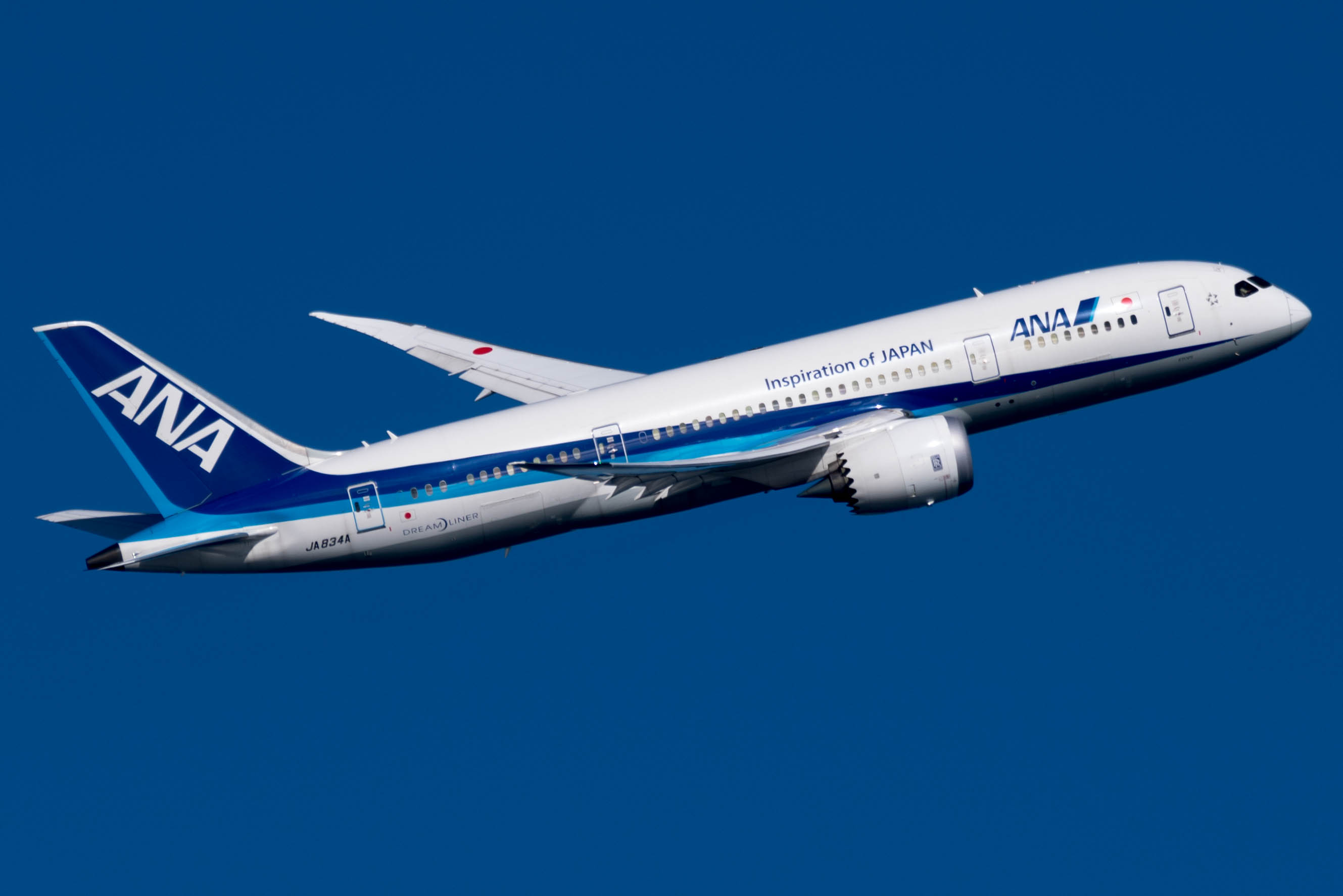
Boeing 787-8

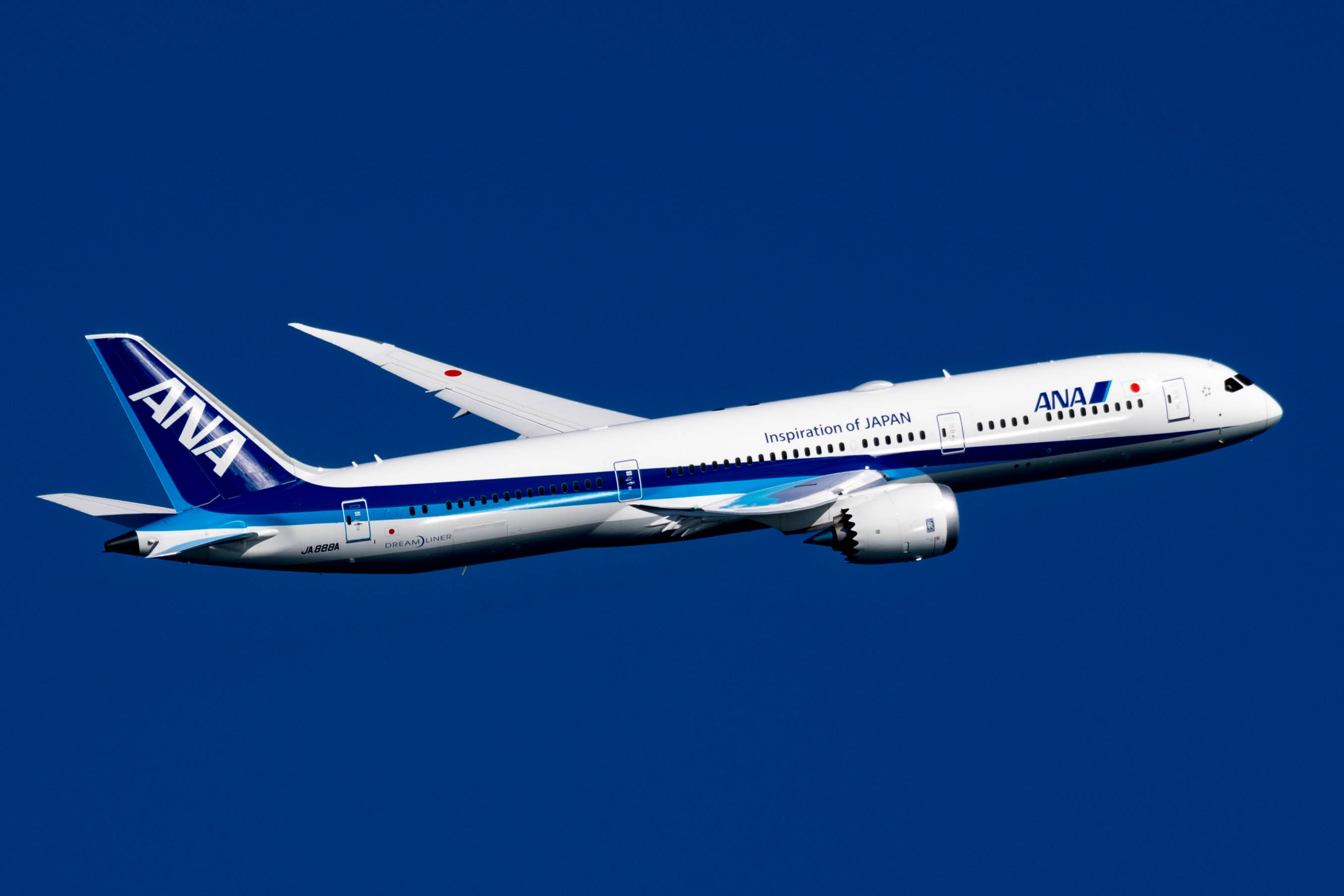
Boeing 787-9

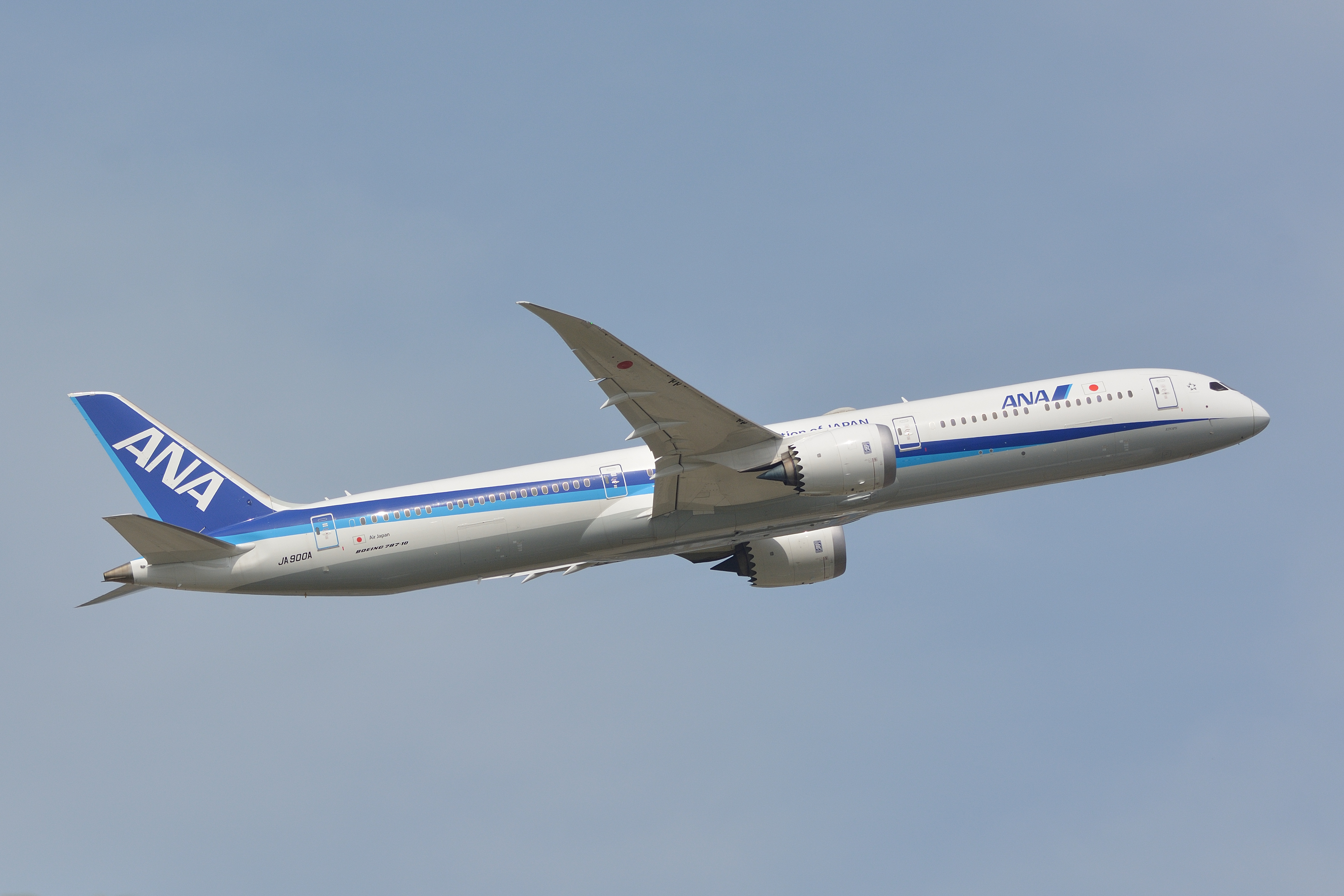
Boeing 787-10
ANA Cargo current fleet

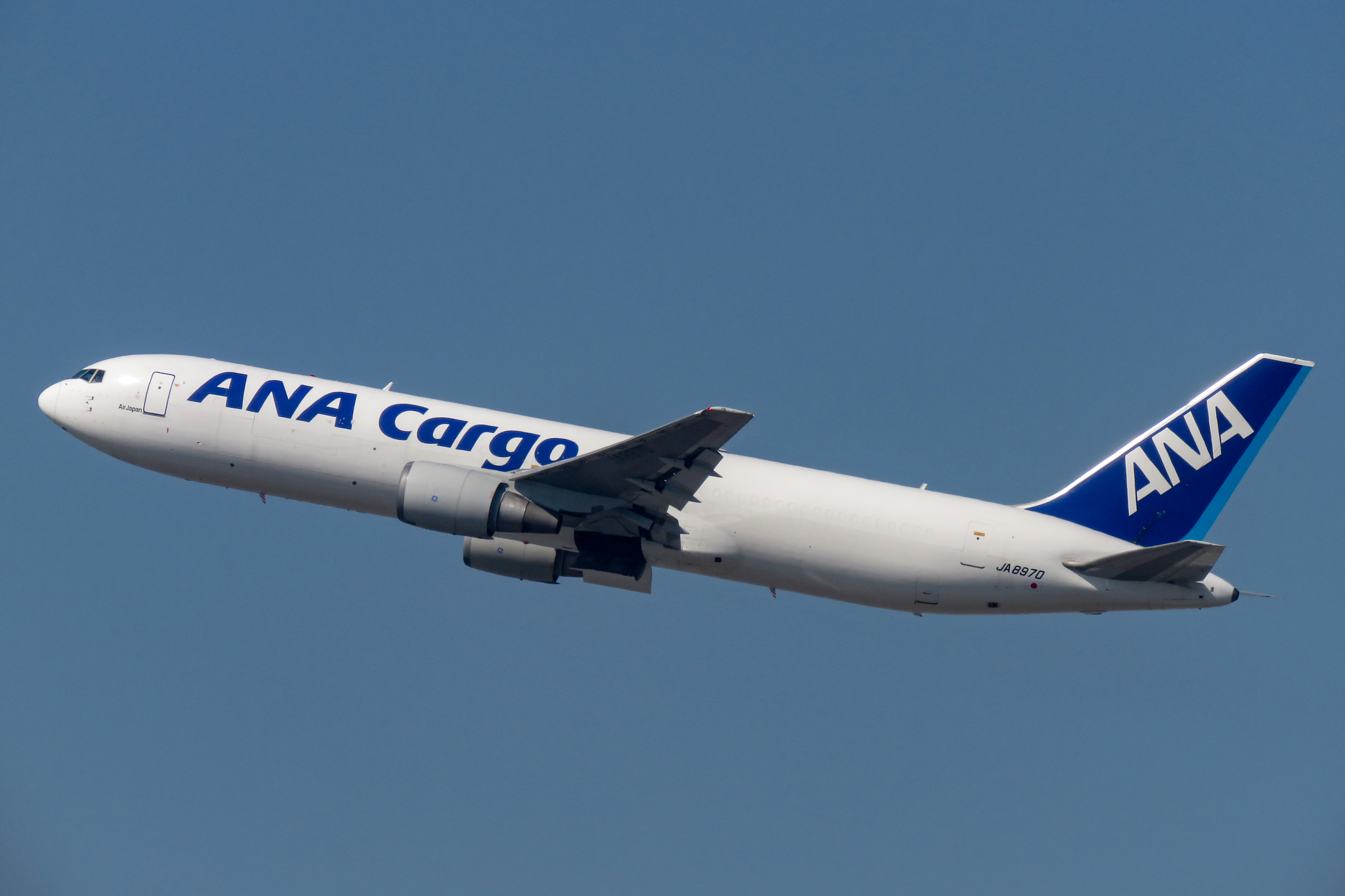
Boeing 767-300BCF

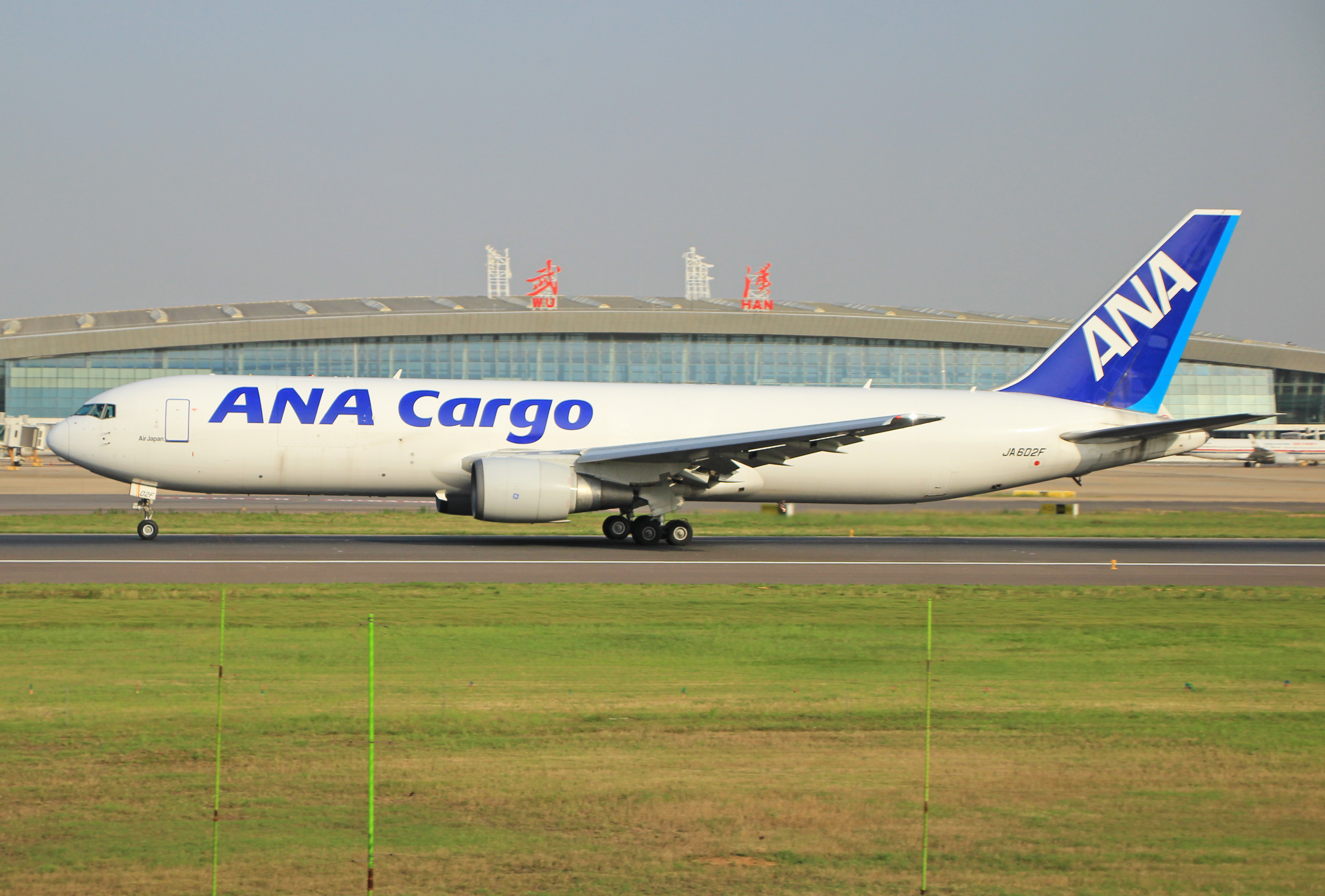
Boeing 767-300F

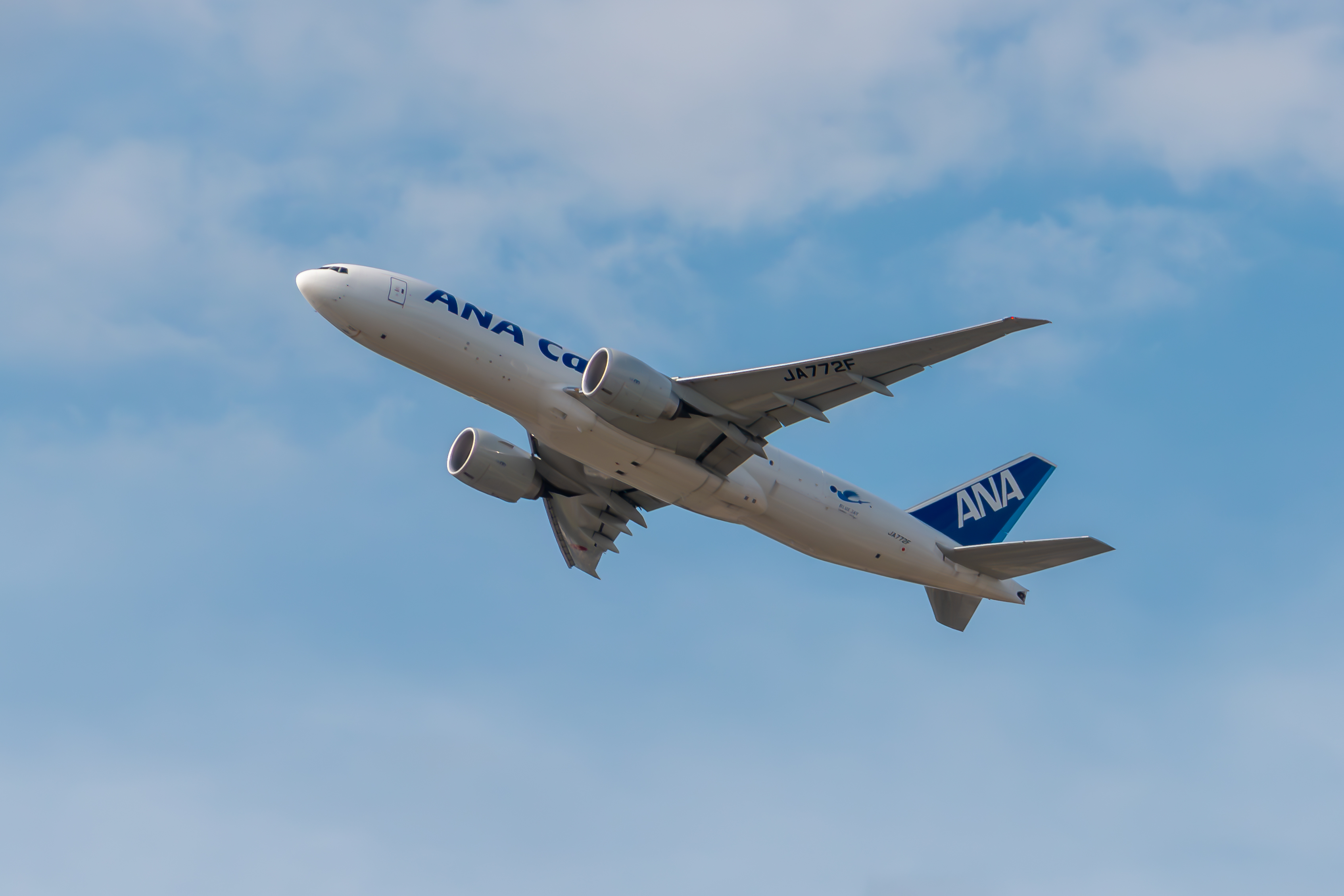
Boeing 777F

=== Fleet development ===
On 31 July 2014, ANA firmed up orders for 7 Airbus A320neos, 23 Airbus A321neos, 20 Boeing 777-9s, 14 Boeing 787-9s and 6 Boeing 777-300ERs, to be used for its short and long-haul fleet renewal. Boeing valued ANA's order at approximately $13 billion at list prices.

On 2 February 2015, ANA placed orders with Airbus and Boeing worth $2.2bn for three Boeing 787-10s, five Boeing 737-800s and seven Airbus A321s. In late July 2015, ANA entered into a secret agreement with Airbus to make additional orders in the future (number and model(s) of aircraft unidentified) in exchange for Airbus support of ANA plans to invest in bankrupt Skymark Airlines.

Also in 2015, ANA placed orders for the since cancelled 15 Mitsubishi Regional Jets for regional flights, which were to be operated by ANA Wings.

On 29 January 2016, ANA signed a purchase agreement with Airbus, covering firm orders for three Airbus A380s, for delivery from fiscal 2018 to operate on the Tokyo (Narita) to Honolulu route.

On 11 July 2022, ANA converted two of its 777-9 orders into the freighter variant 777-8F.

=== Boeing 787 ===
ANA was the launch customer for the new Boeing widebody, the Boeing 787 Dreamliner, ordering 50 examples with an option for 50 more in April 2004. ANA split the order between 30 of the short-range 787-3 and 20 of the long-haul 787-8. However, ANA later converted its −3 orders to the −8 variant.

Deliveries finally began in late 2011 when ANA received its first Boeing 787 on 21 September, the first-ever Dreamliner to be delivered in the world. ANA flew its first Boeing 787 passenger flight on 26 October 2011, which operated as a charter flight from Tokyo Narita to Hong Kong. ANA also became the second airline to receive the Boeing 787-9 on 28 July 2014. Despite being second, the airline preceded launch customer Air New Zealand for the first commercial flight on the 787-9, a special sightseeing charter for Japanese and American school children on 4 August.

=== Historic fleet ===
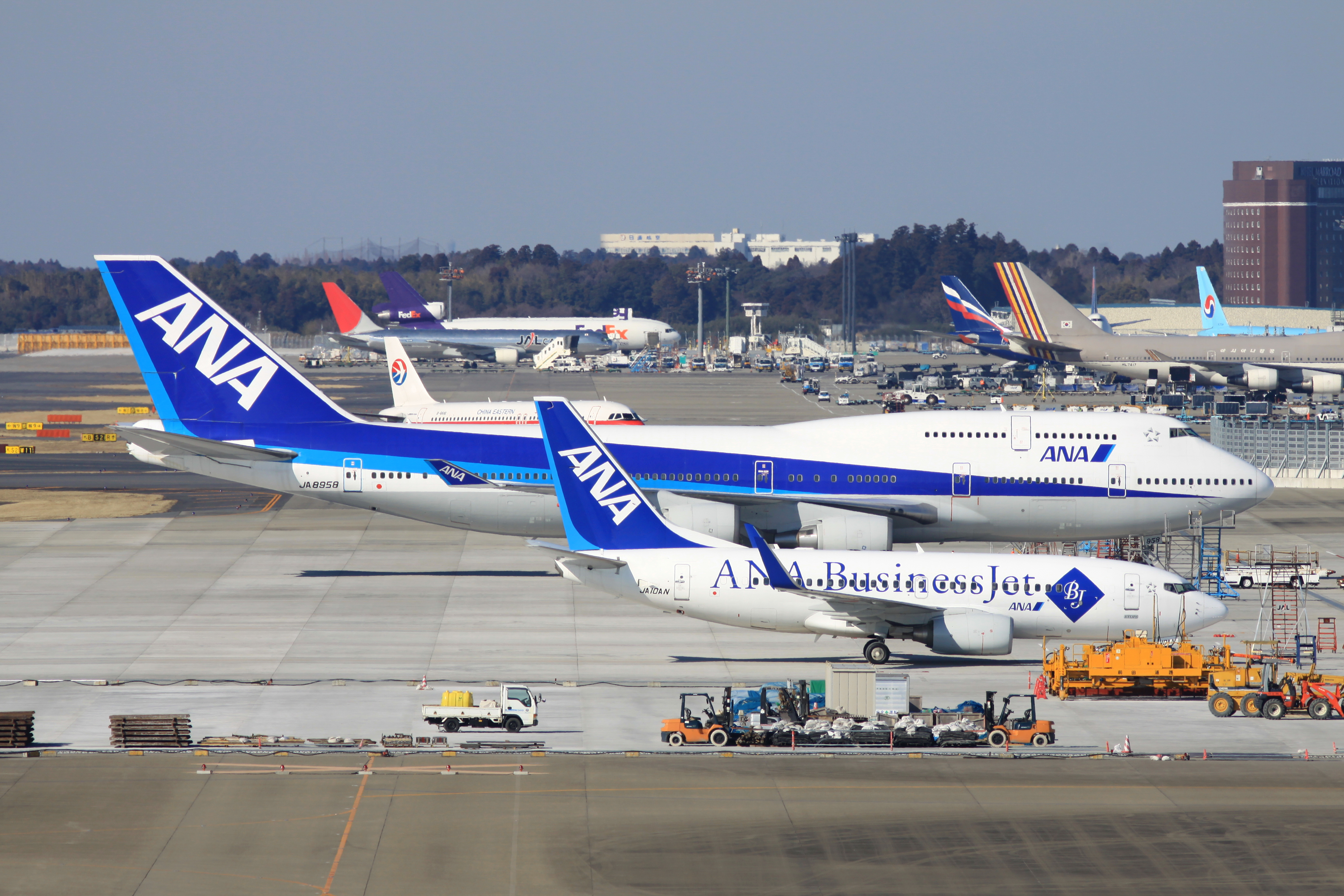
An All Nippon Airways Boeing 747-400 and a Boeing 737-700ER at Narita Airport in 2010. Both types have since been retired.

The NAMC YS-11 was an important aircraft for All Nippon Airways, although most of them were used under the name of ANK, or Air Nippon, a subsidiary of All Nippon Airways. The final YS-11 in operation was retired in 2006. Some YS-11s are in museums, or otherwise scrapped or taken apart. After a final retirement process through September 2006, all YS-11s were grounded, and obligated to retire, unless privately owned and were privately restored. The YS-11 was a big part of All Nippon Airways from the 1970s to the early 1990s when it was used on domestic operations.

ANA flew its last flight of an Airbus A321-100 on 29 February 2008. This marked the end of almost ten years of operation of the Airbus A321-100, of which ANA was the only Japanese operator.

All Nippon Airways had historically operated the following aircraft:

Aircraft	Year introduced	Year retired	Replacement	Notes/refs
Airbus A320-200	1991	2021	Airbus A321neo	Including taken over from Peach Aviation fleet.
Airbus A321-100	1998	2008	Boeing 737-800	
Boeing 727-100	1964	1974	Boeing 727-200	One aircraft crashed as All Nippon Airways Flight 60.
Boeing 727-200	1969	1990	Boeing 767-300	One crashed as All Nippon Airways Flight 58.
Boeing 737-200	1969	1992	Airbus A320-200	
Boeing 737-500	2003	2020	Airbus A320neo family Boeing 737-800	
Boeing 737-700	2005	2021	Airbus A320neo family	
Boeing 737-700ER	2007	2016	None	
Boeing 747-200B	1986	2005	Boeing 747-400	
Boeing 747SR-100	1974	2006	Boeing 747-400D	One aircraft was hijacked as All Nippon Airways Flight 857.
Boeing 747-400	1990	2011	Boeing 777-300ER	
Boeing 747-400D	1992	2014	Boeing 767-300ER; Boeing 777-300	One aircraft was hijacked as All Nippon Airways Flight 61.
Boeing 767-200	1983	2004	Boeing 767-300; Boeing 767-300ER	
Boeing 767-300	1988	2020	Boeing 767-300ER; Boeing 787 Dreamliner	
Convair 440	1959	1964	Unknown	
de Havilland Dove	1953	1962	Unknown	In service with Nippon Helicopter and Aeroplane and Far East Airlines.
de Havilland Heron	1954	1961	Unknown	In service with Nippon Helicopter and Aeroplane.
Douglas DC-3	1955	1964	Unknown	In service with Far East Airlines prior to merger.
Fokker F27 Friendship	1961	1973	Unknown	
Fokker 50	2005	2009	Unknown	Operated by Air Central.
Handley Page Marathon	1954	1960	Unknown	In service with Far East Airlines prior to merger.
Lockheed L-1011 Tristar	1974	1995	Boeing 767	Purchased due to bribery by Lockheed.
NAMC YS-11	1965	1991	Unknown	One aircraft crashed as All Nippon Airways Flight 533.
Vickers Viscount	1961	1969	Unknown	

=== Gallery ===
All Nippon Airways former fleet

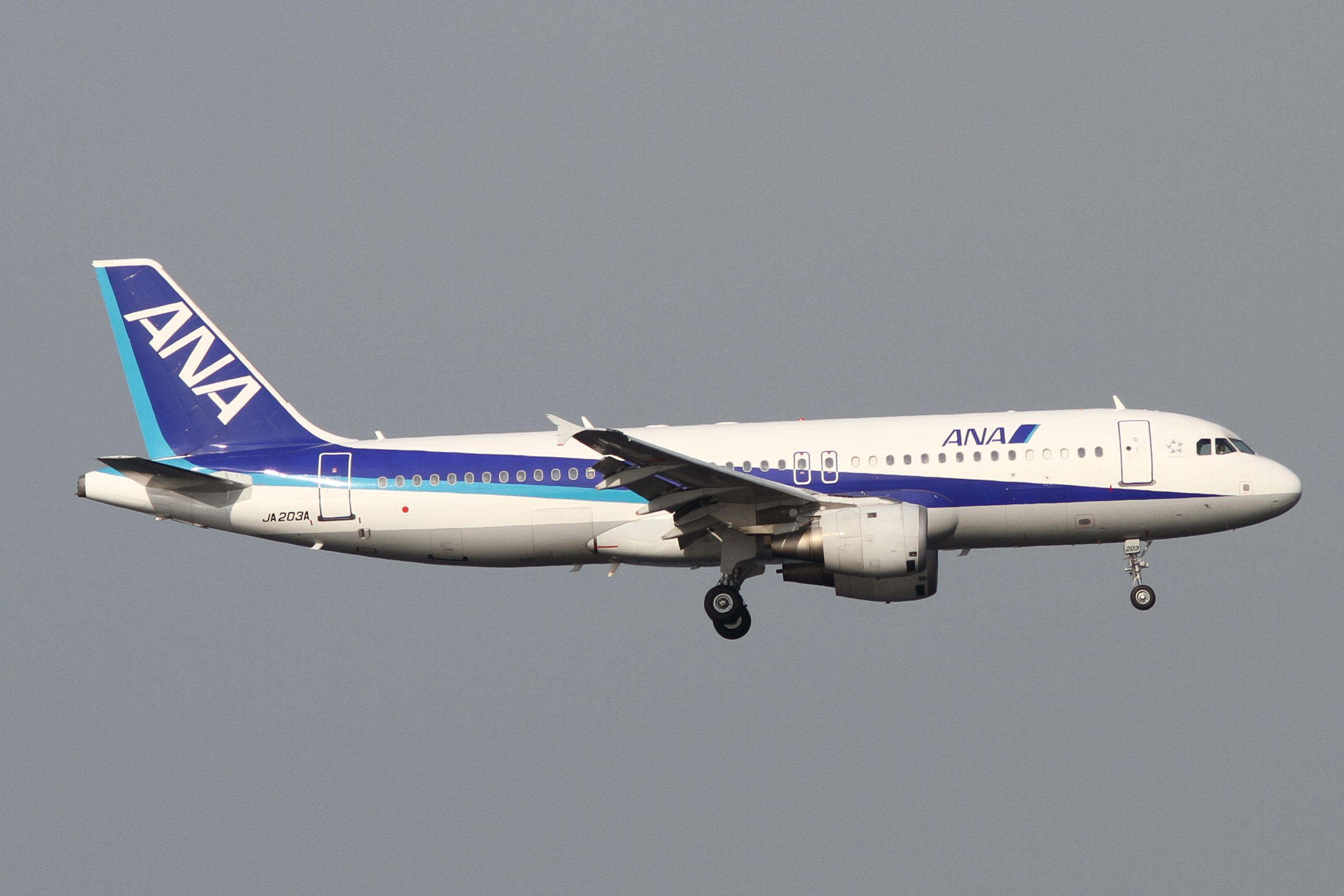
Airbus A320-200

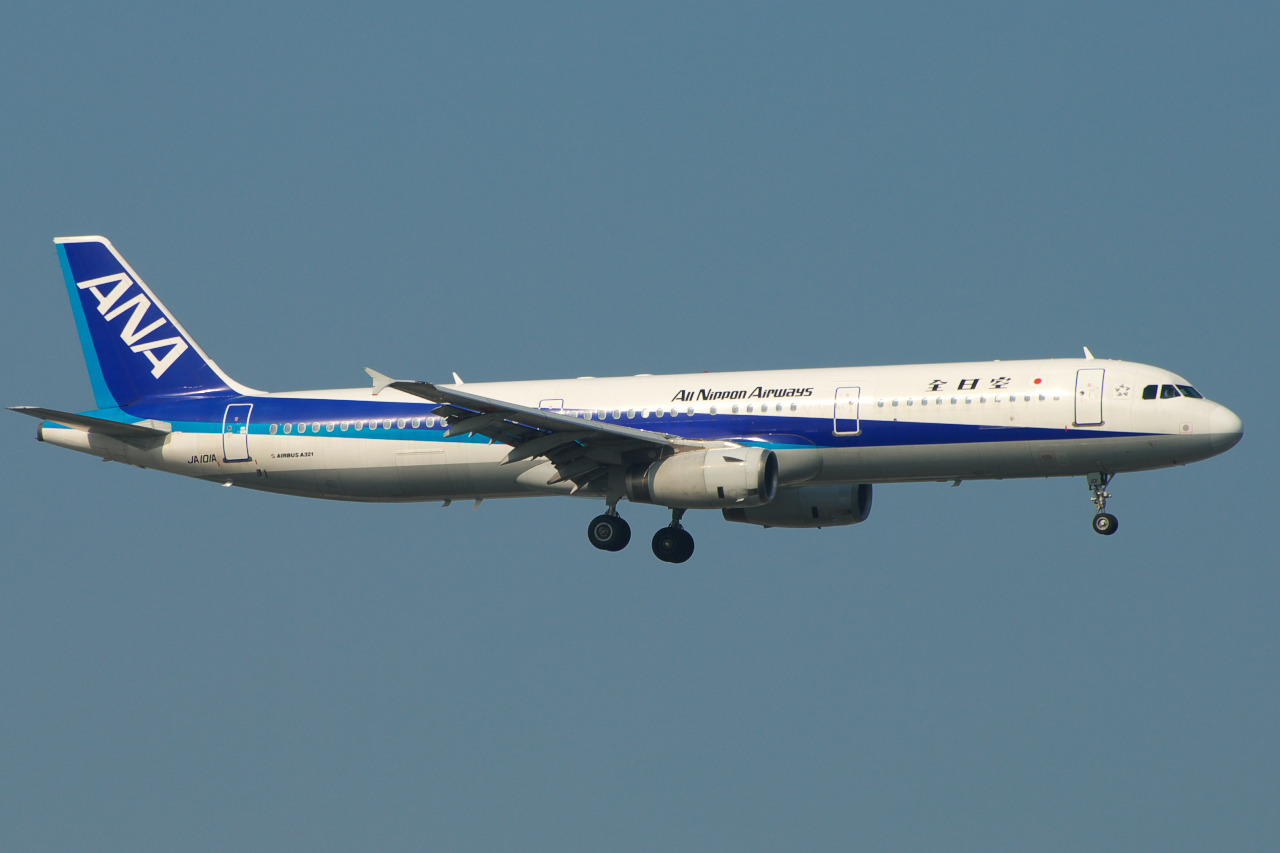
Airbus A321-100

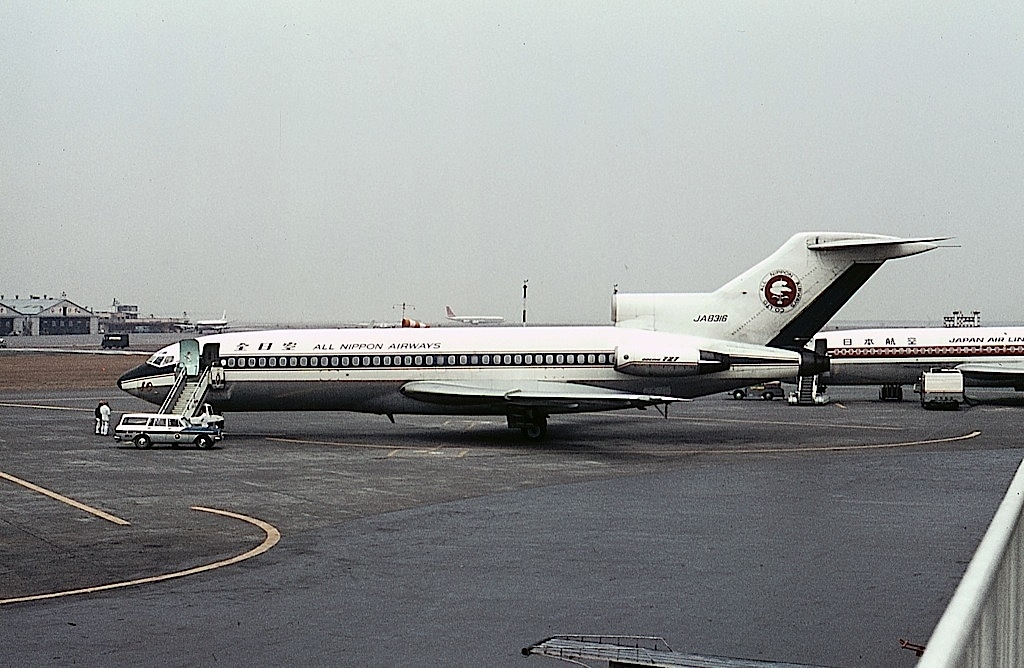
Boeing 727-100

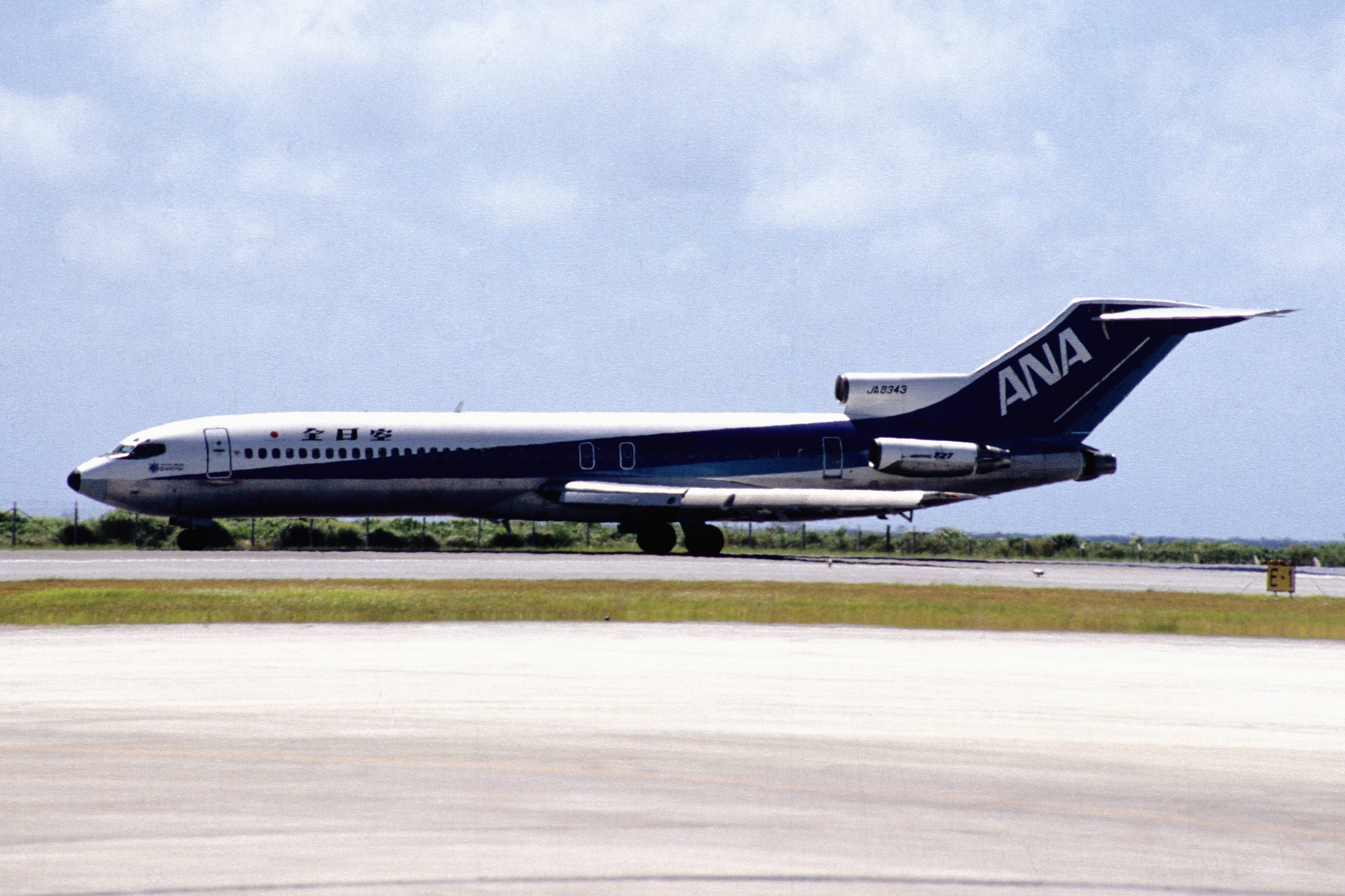
Boeing 727-200

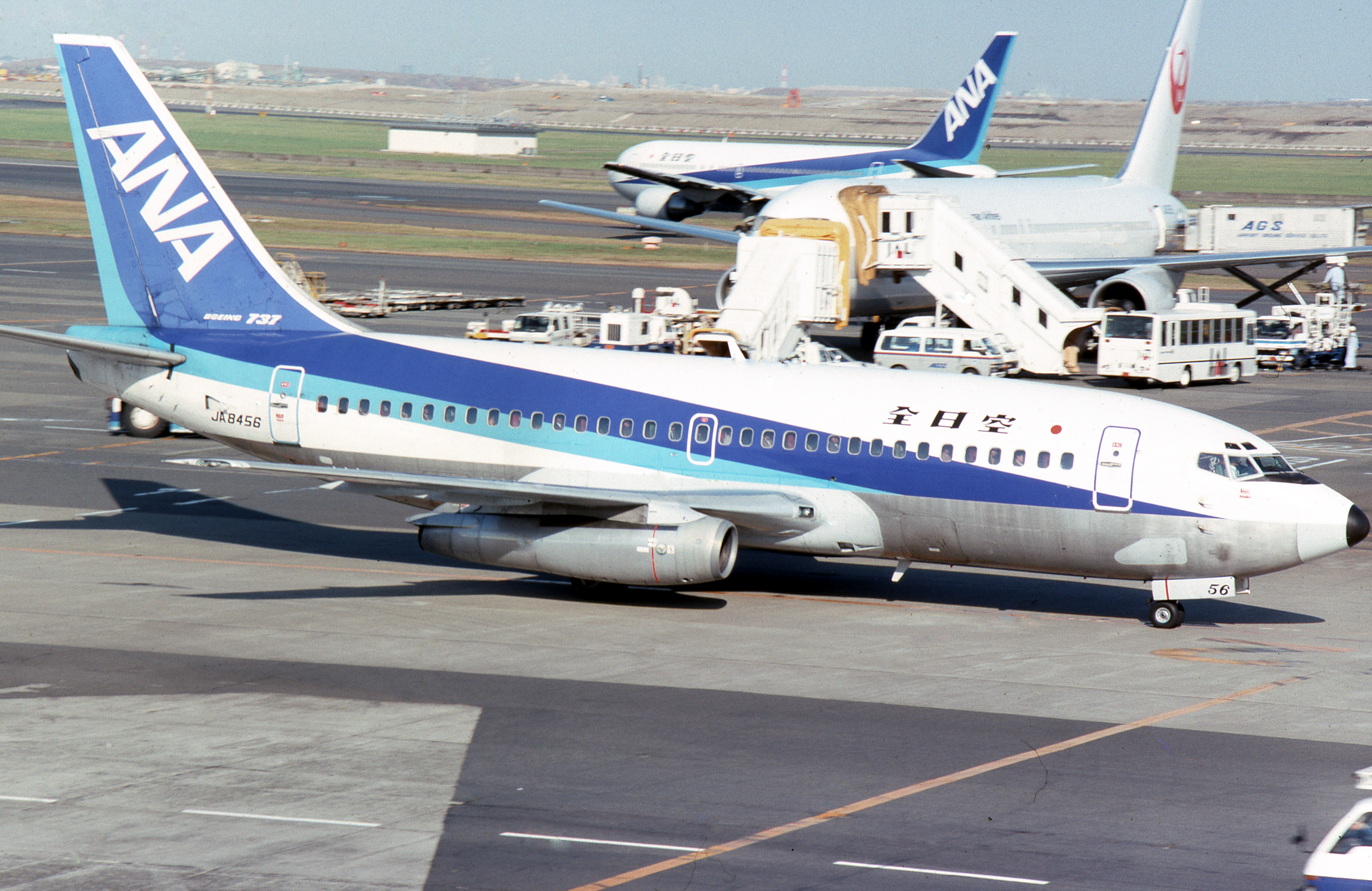
Boeing 737-200

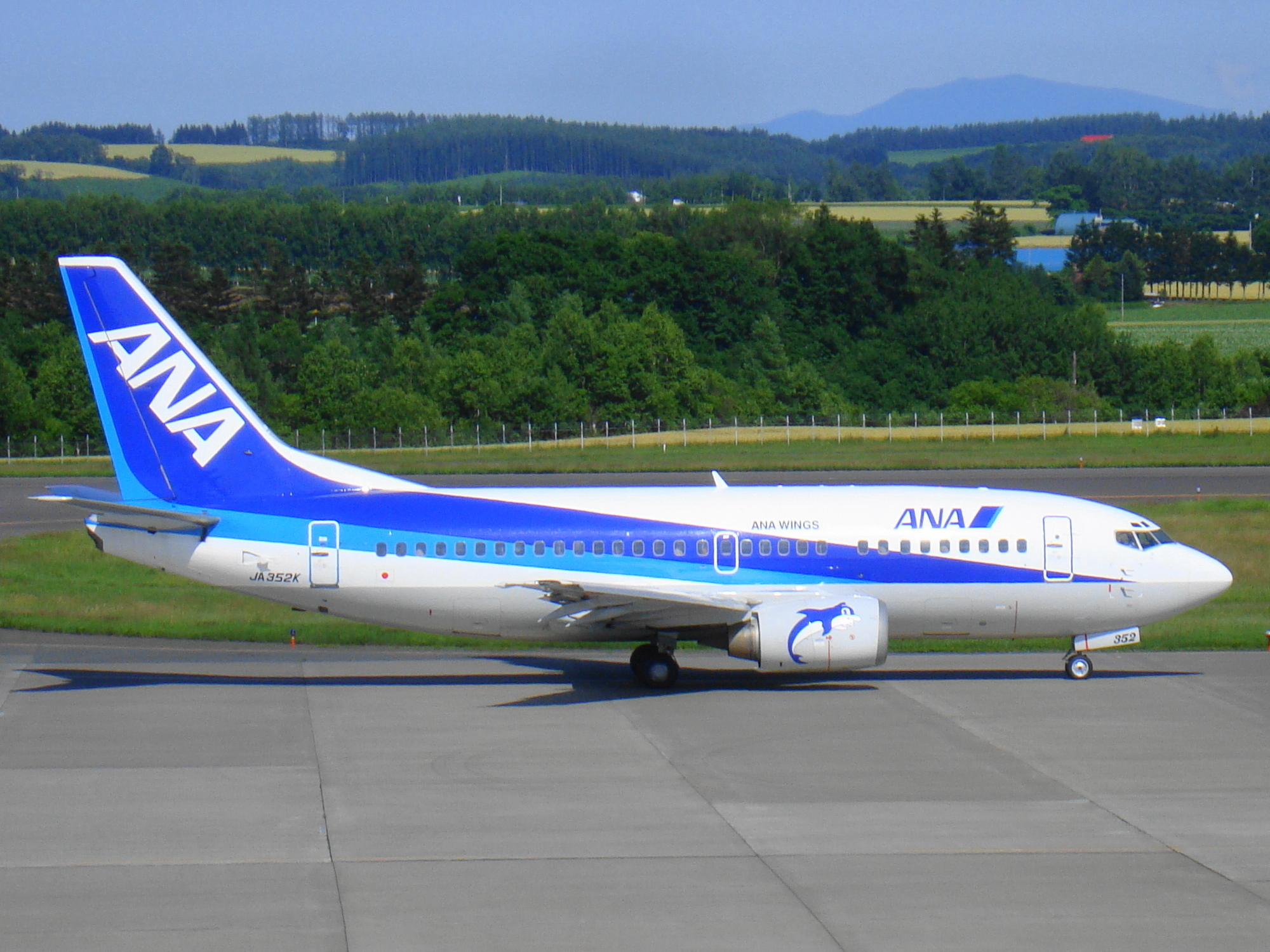
Boeing 737-500

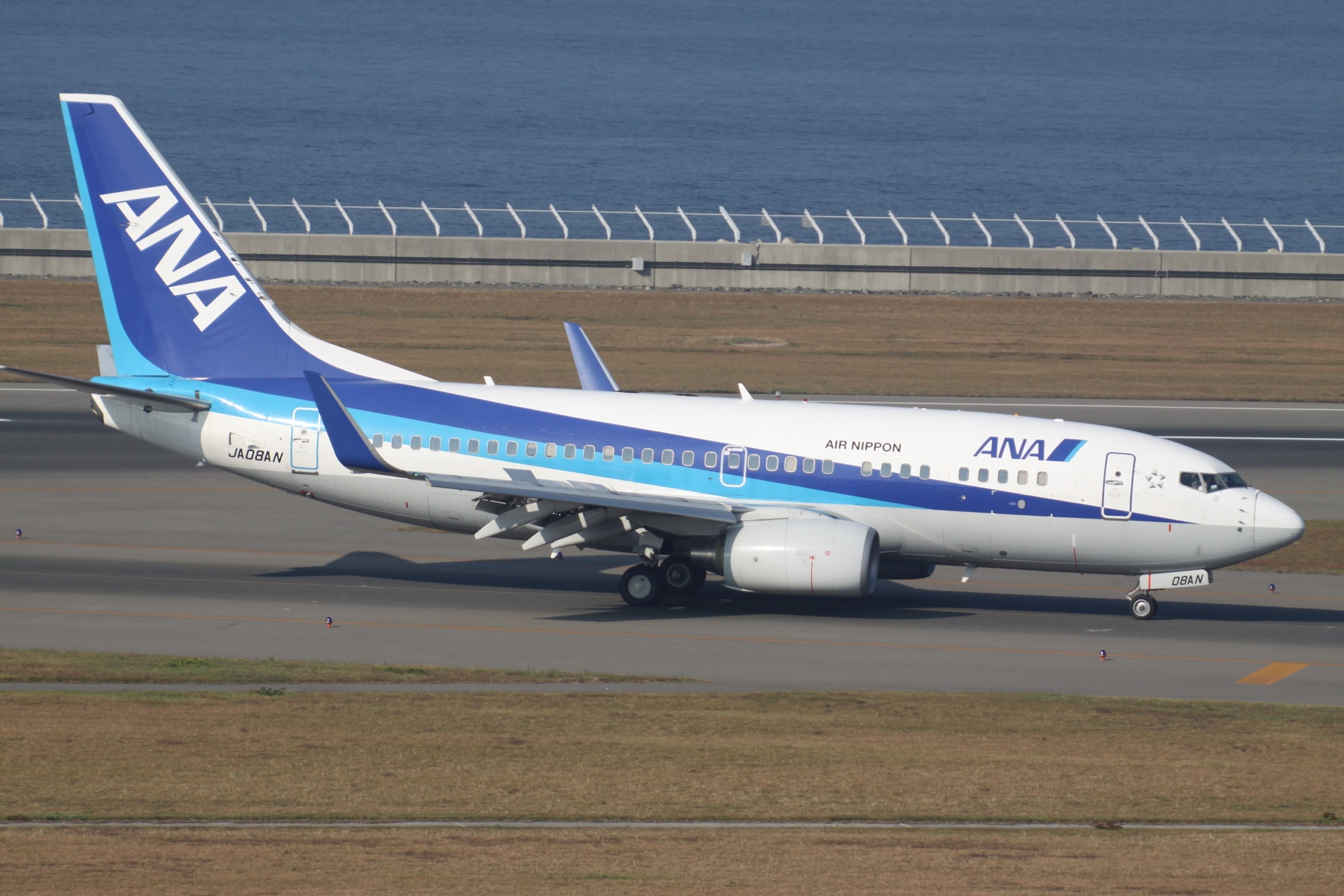
Boeing 737-700

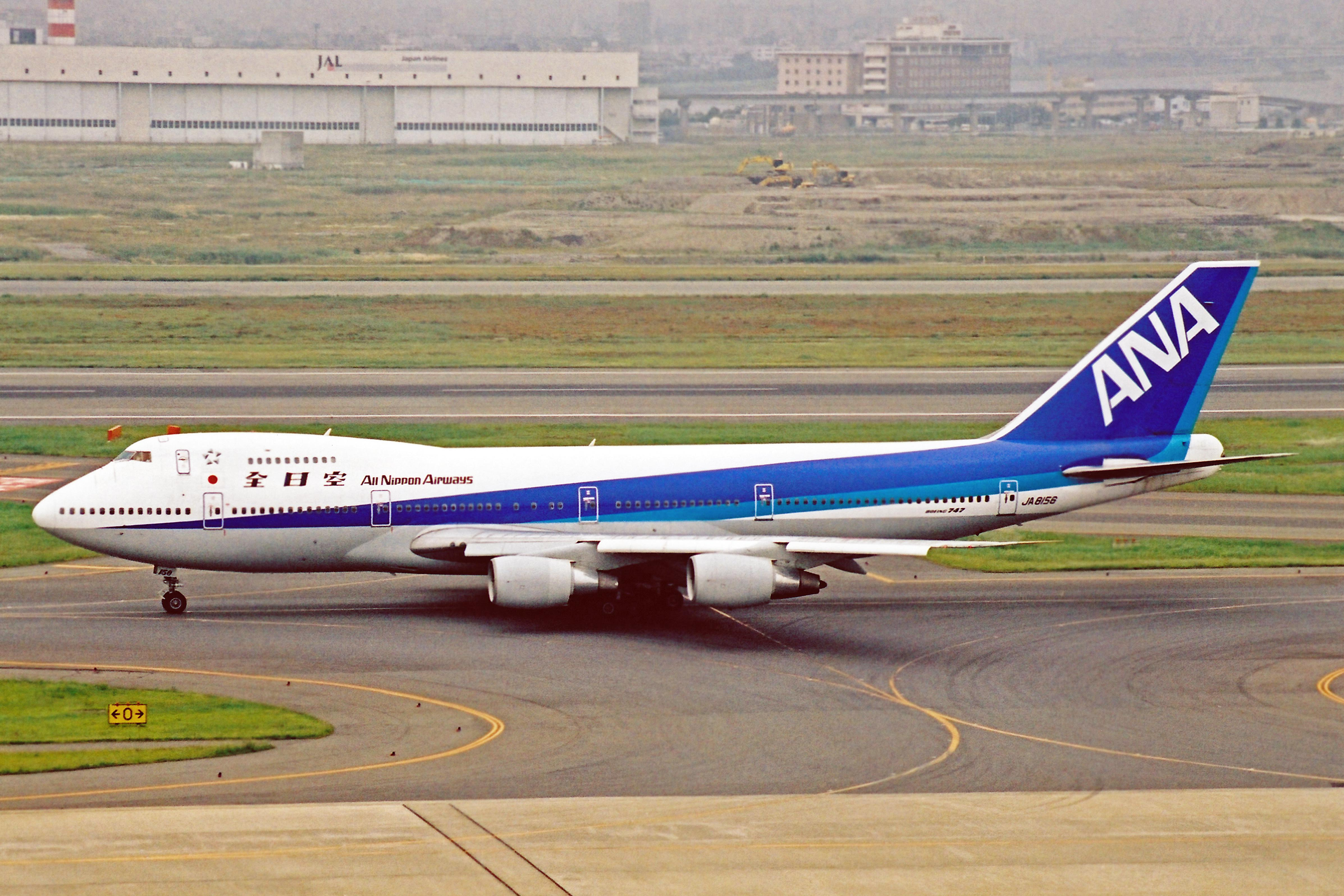
Boeing 747SR-100

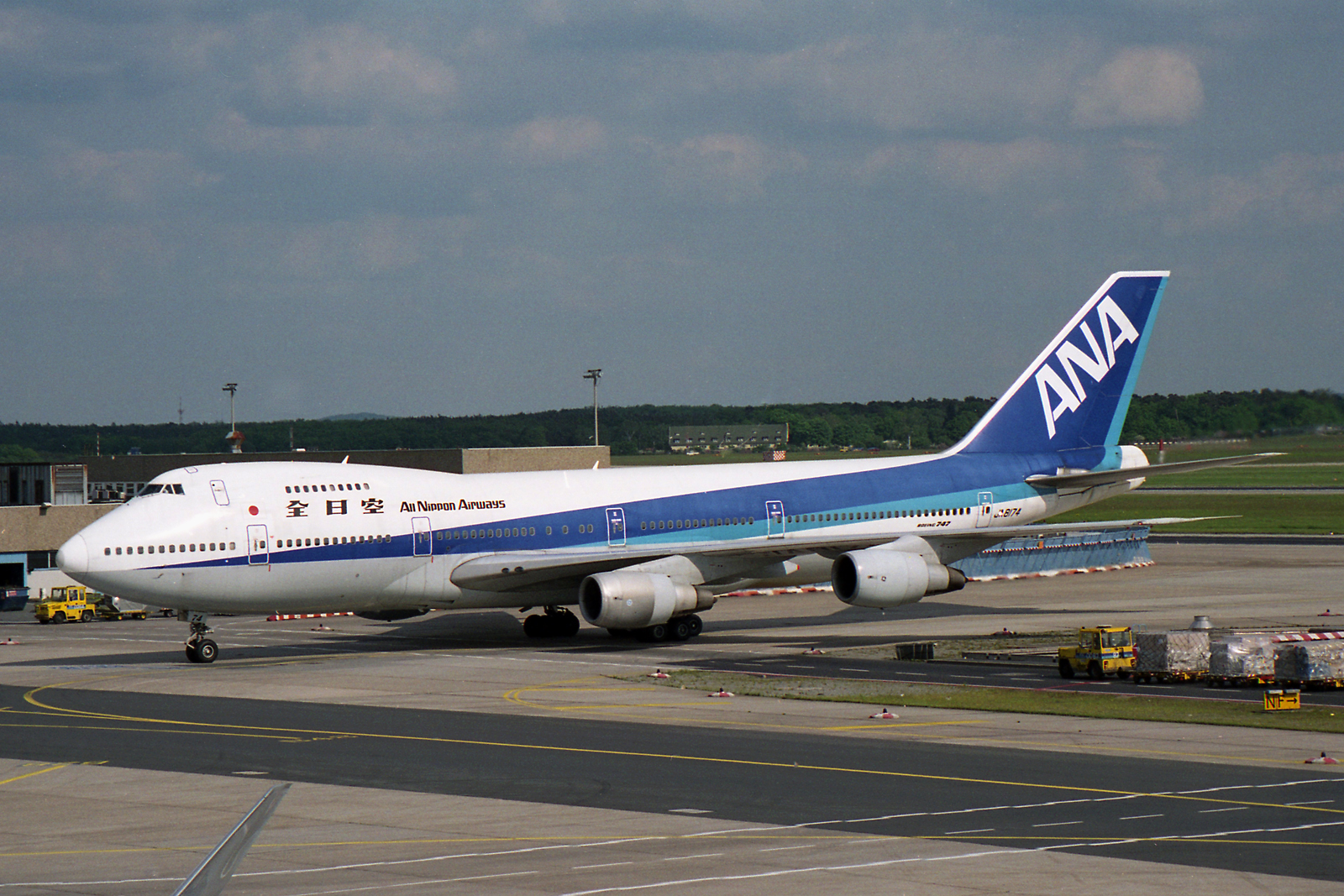
Boeing 747-200B

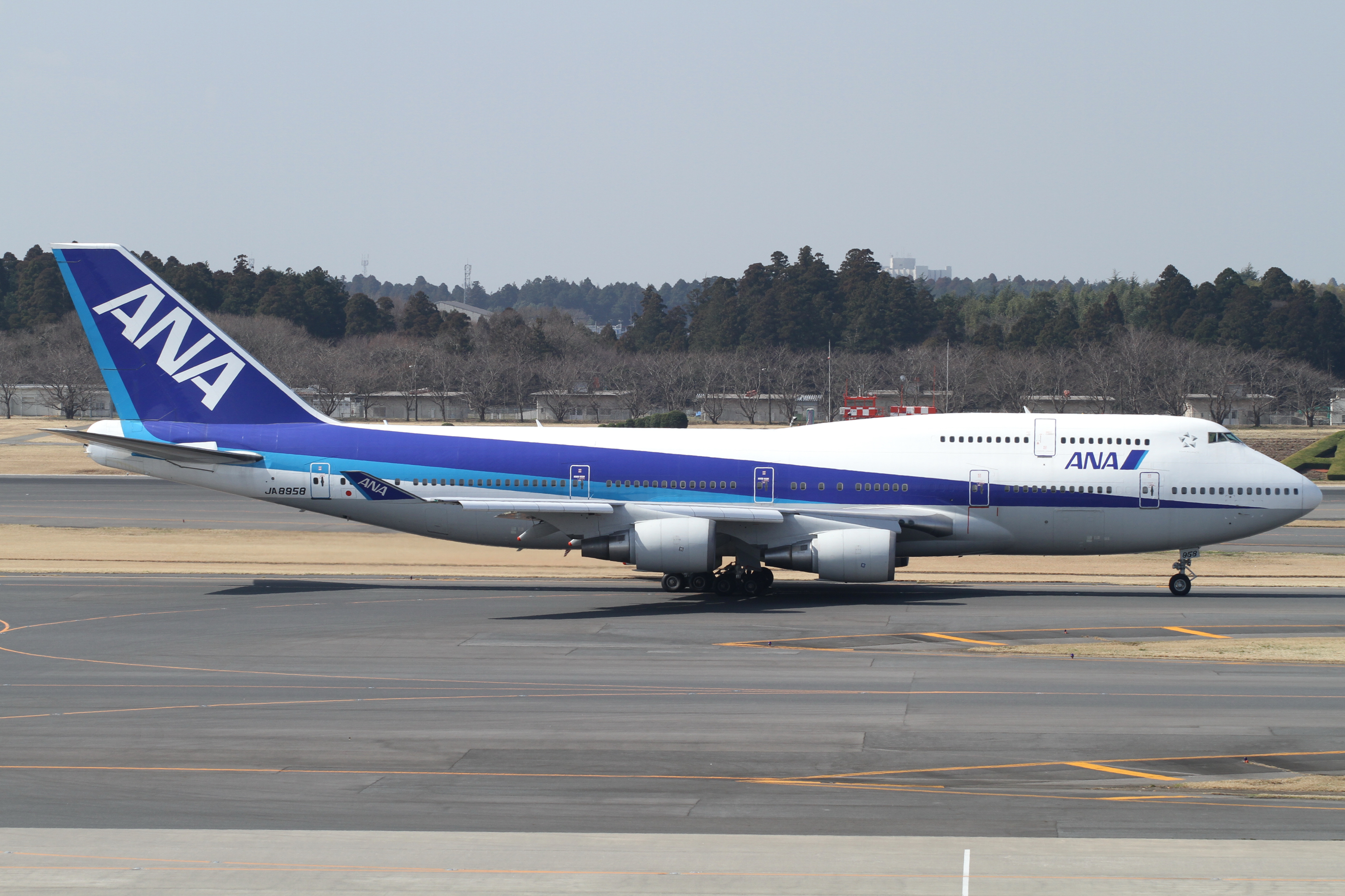
Boeing 747-400

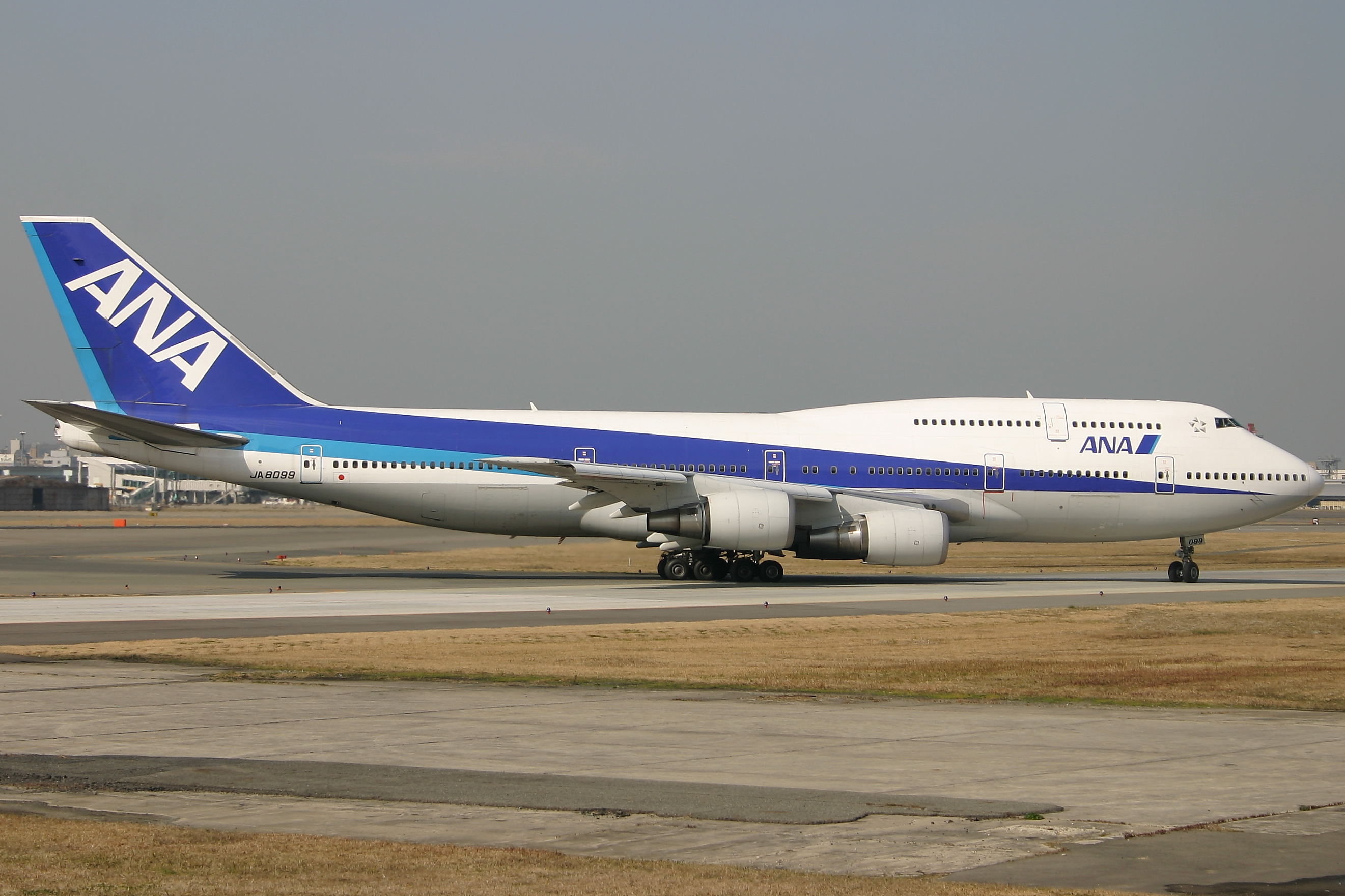
Boeing 747-400D

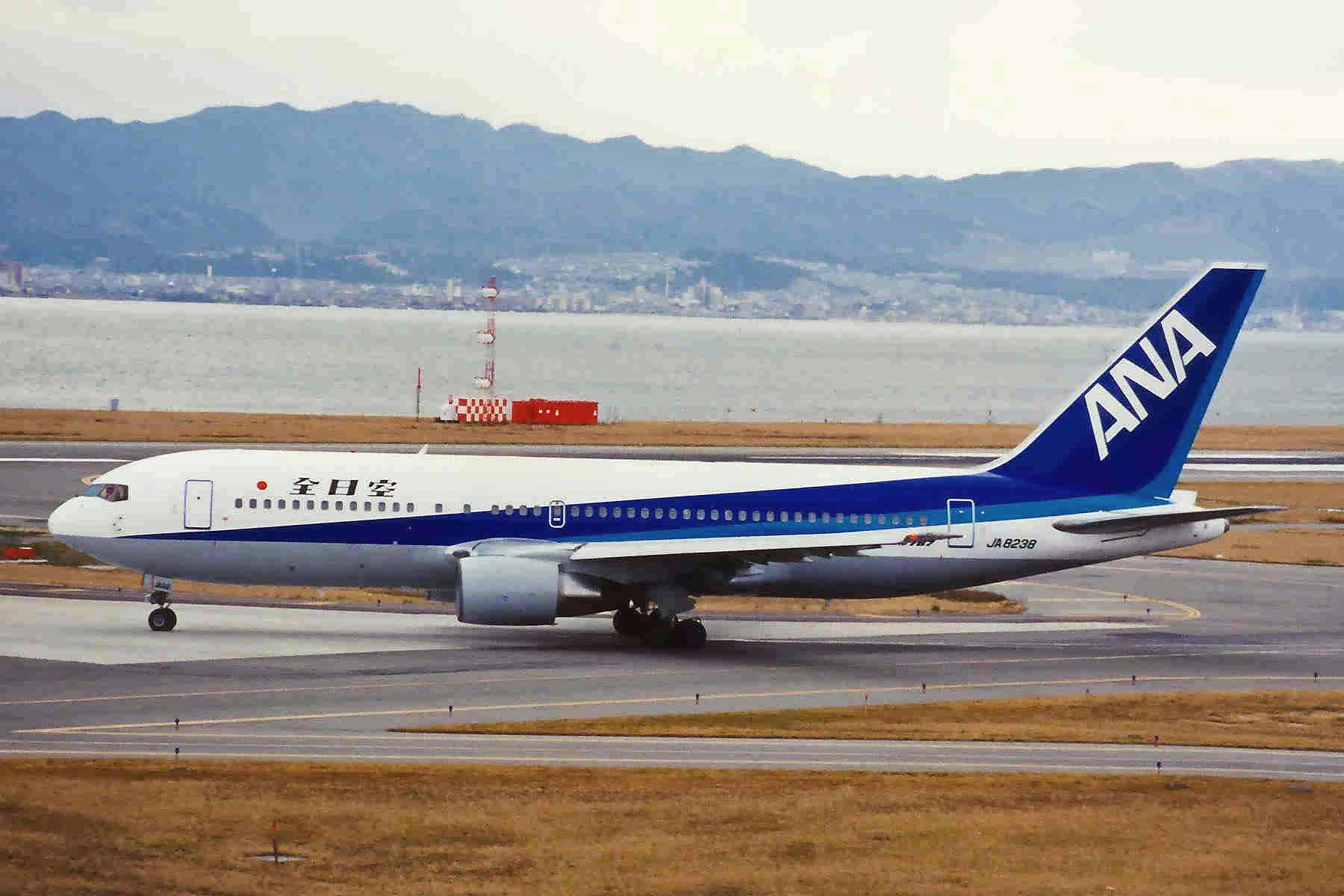
Boeing 767-200

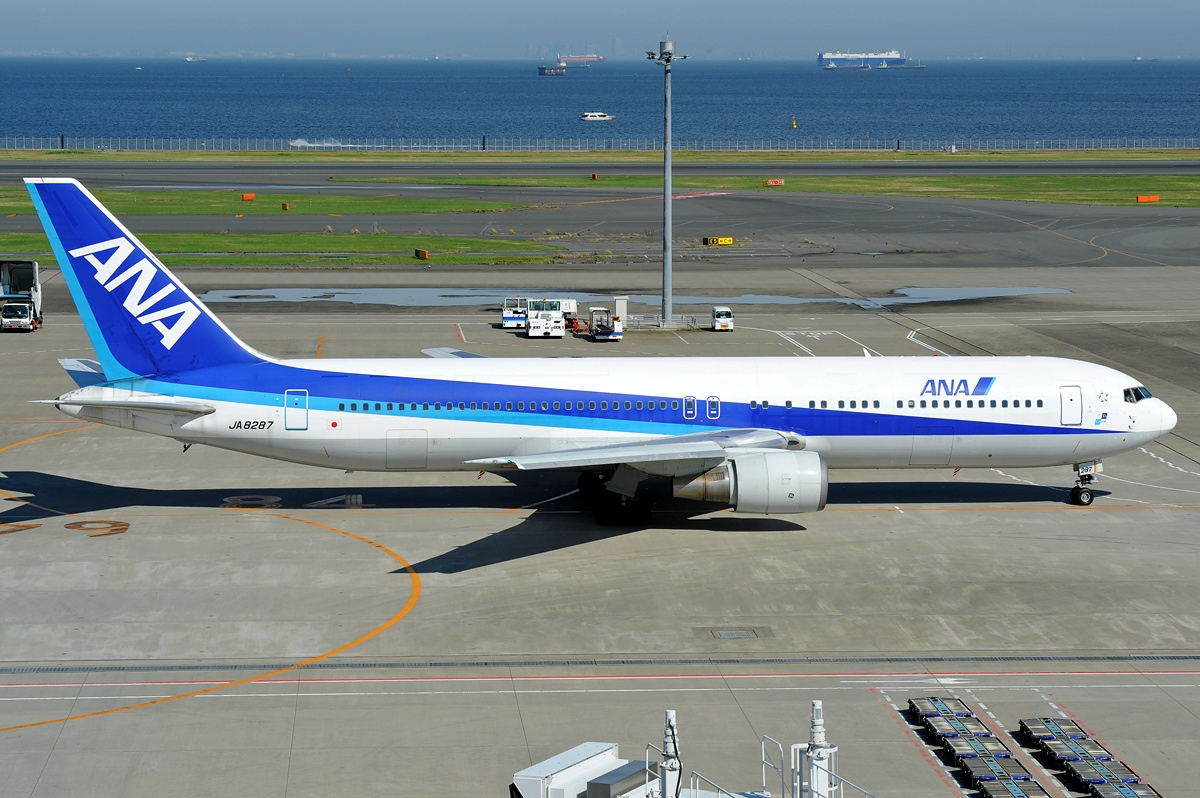
Boeing 767-300

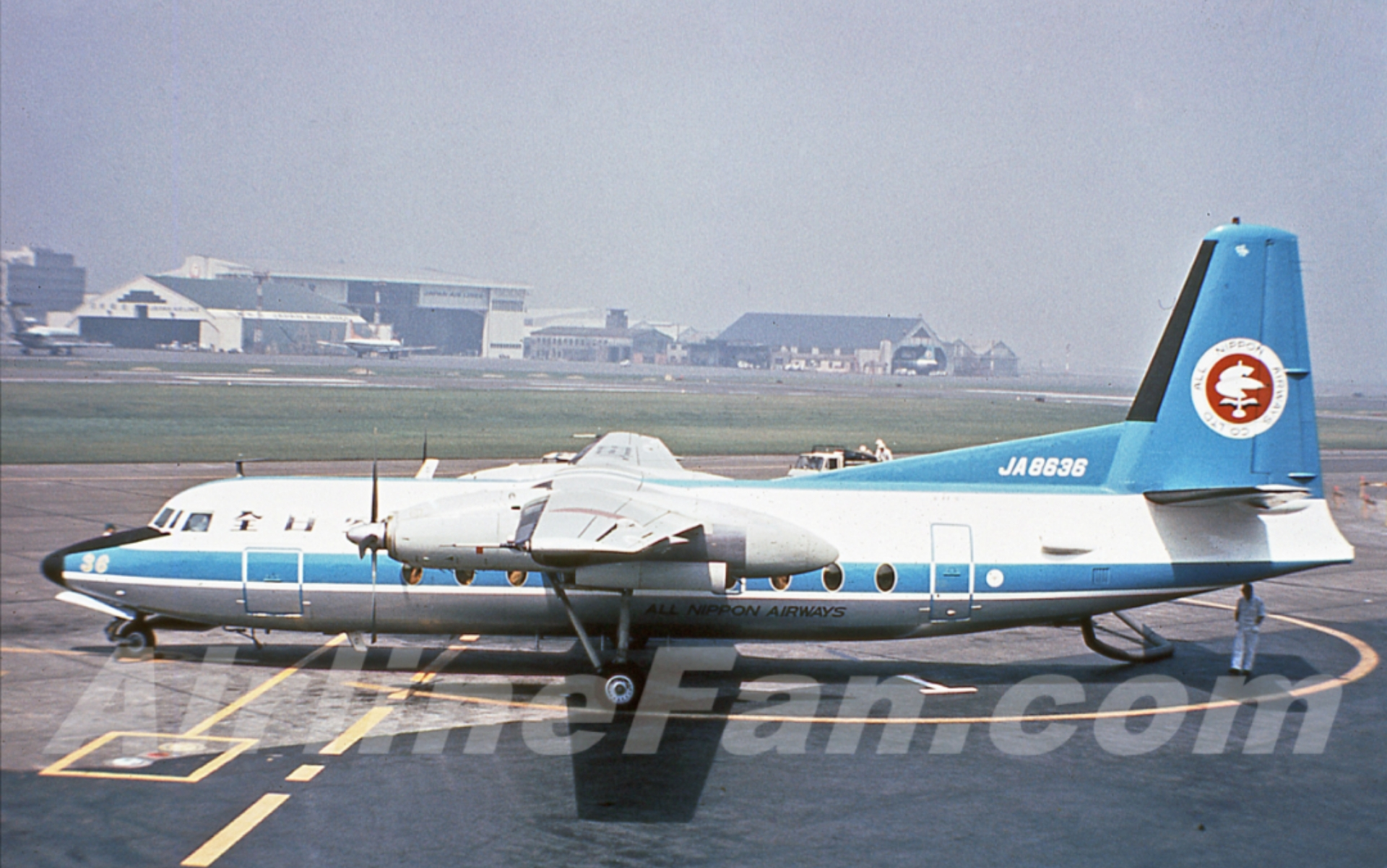
Fokker F27 Friendship

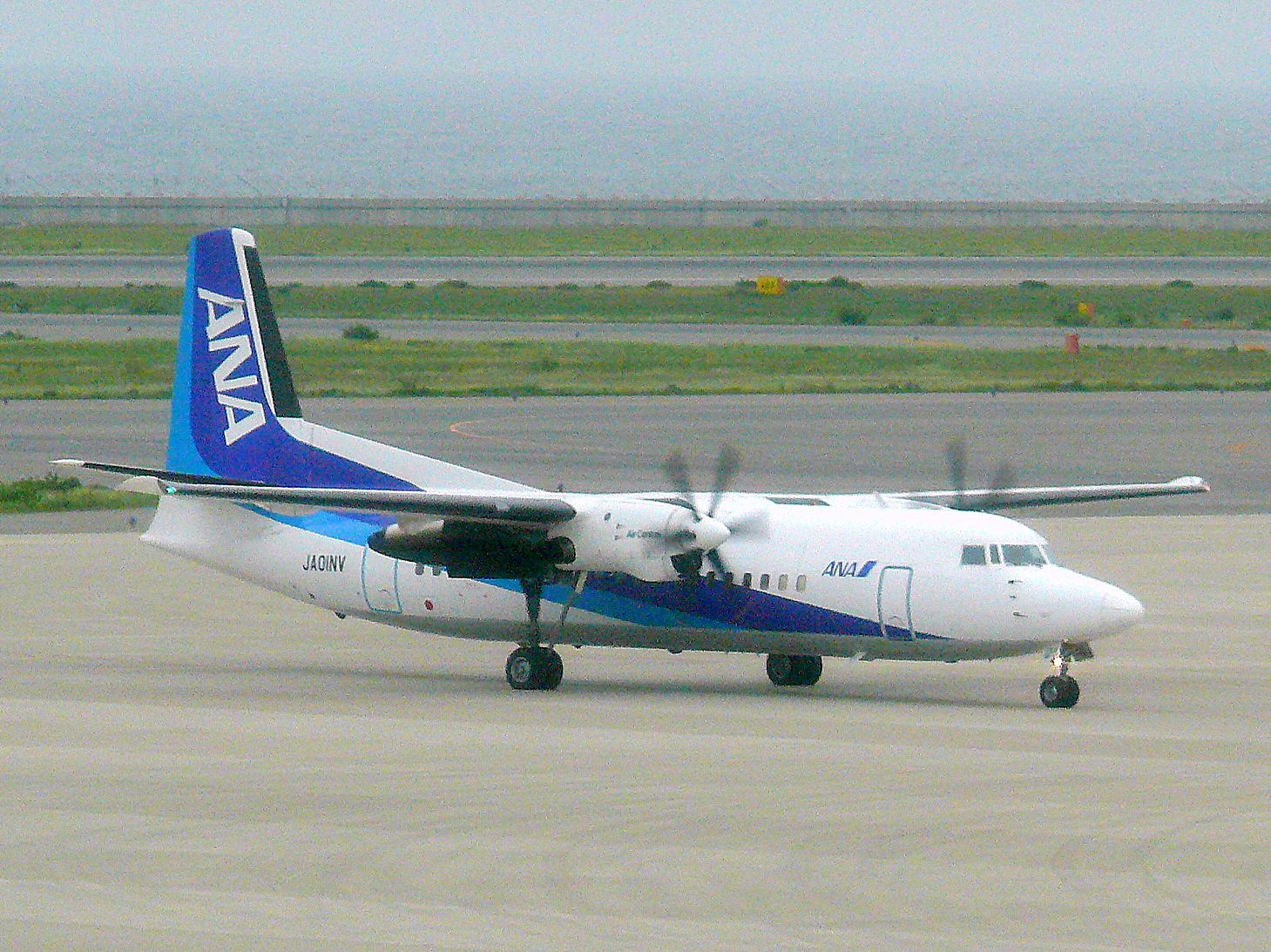
Fokker 50

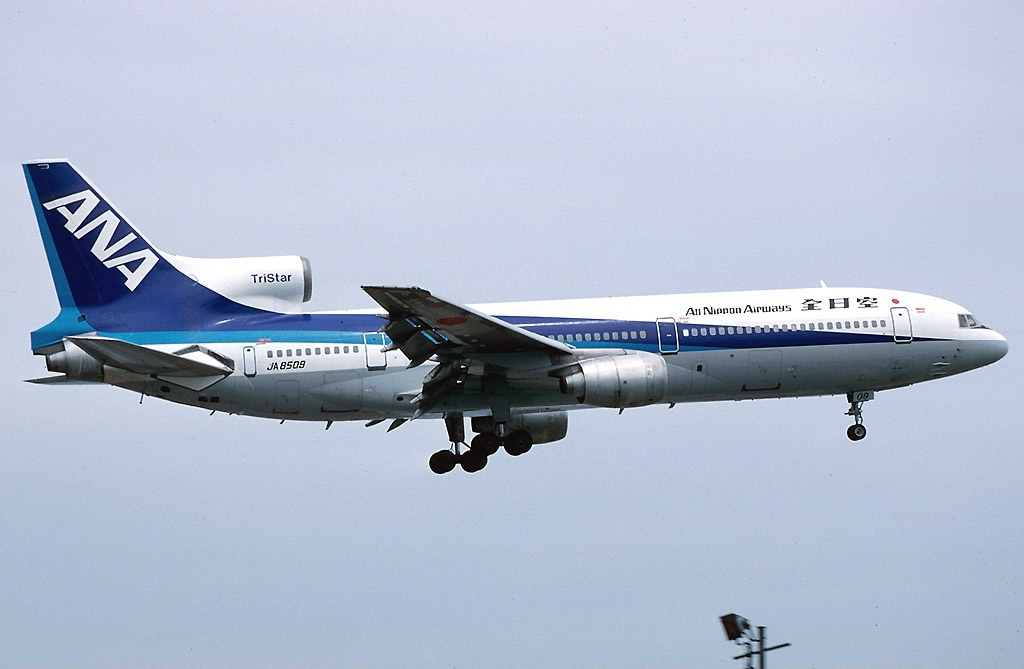
Lockheed L-1011 Tristar

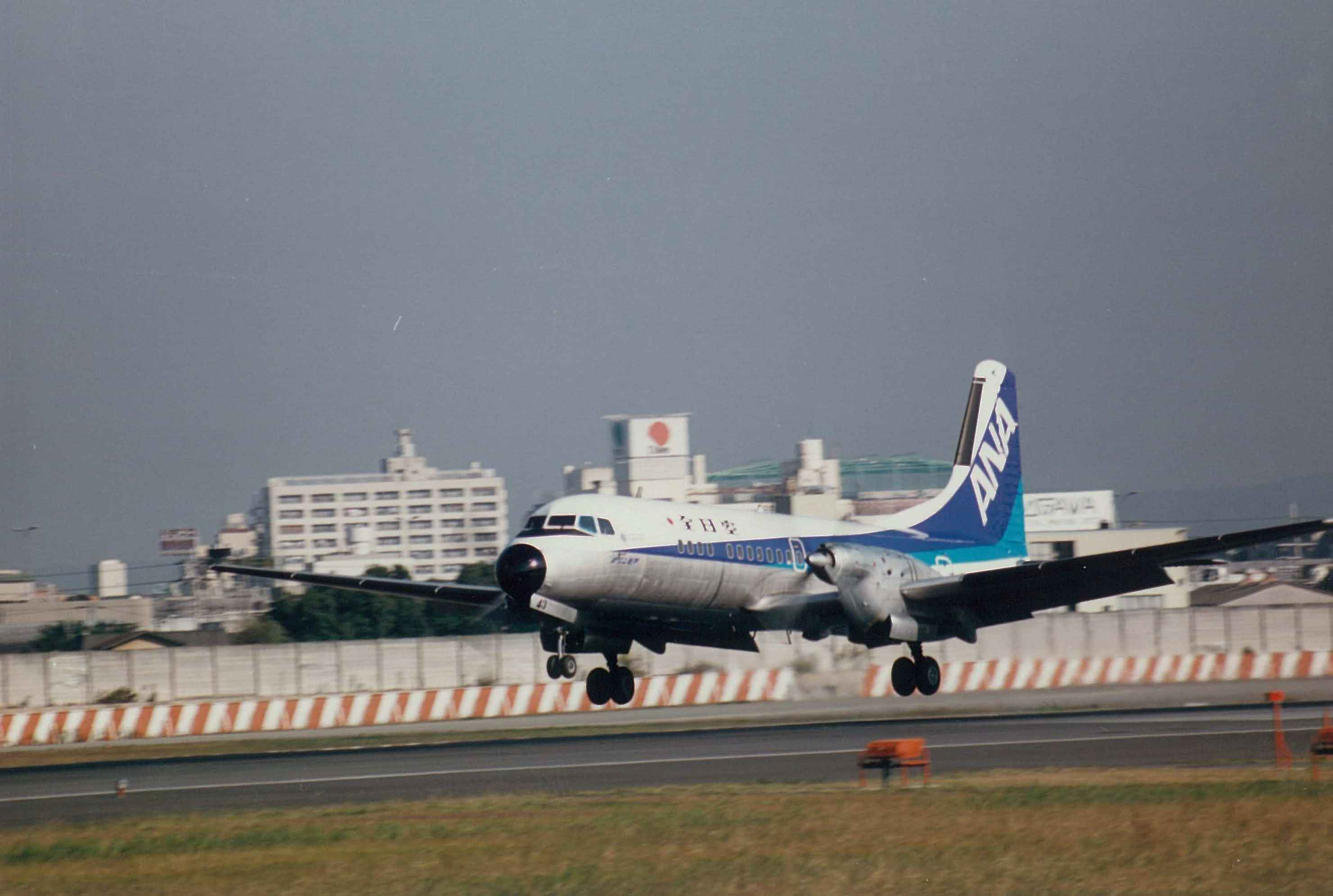
NAMC YS-11

== Liveries ==
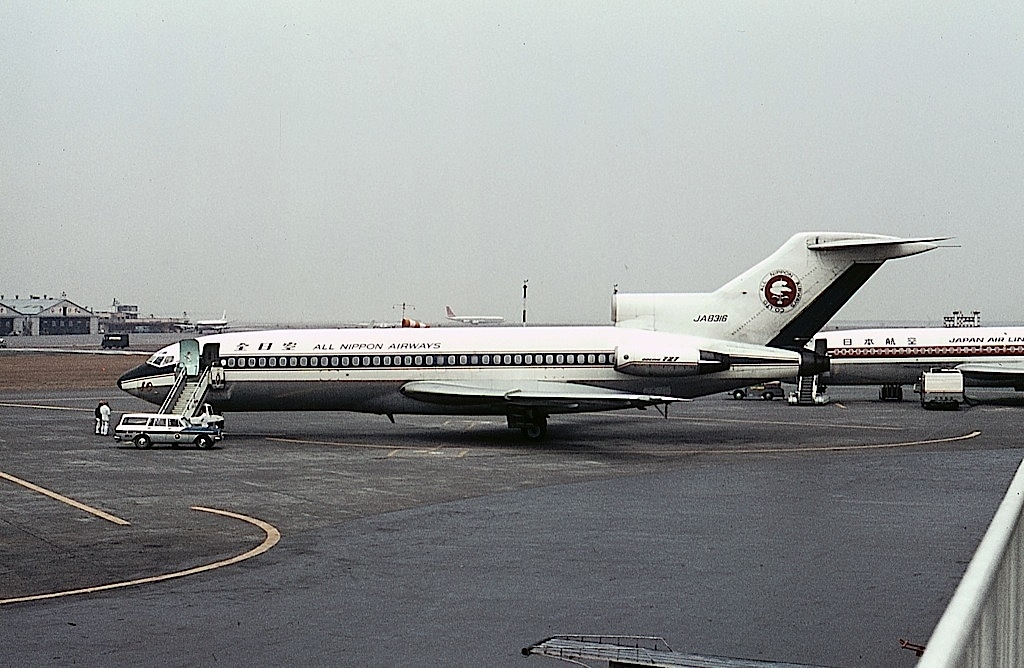
An ANA's 727-100 with original cheatline livery

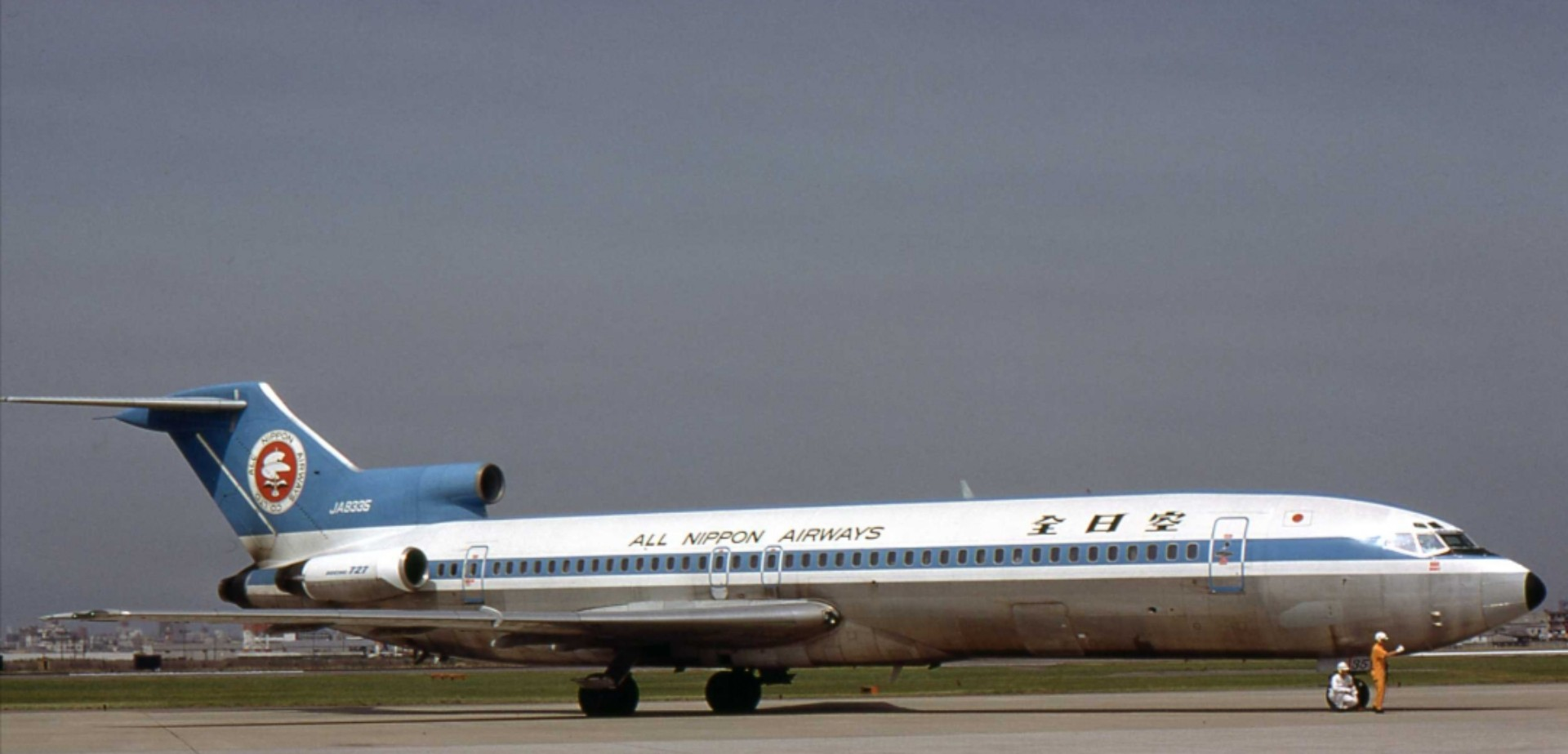
An ANA's 727-200 with "Mohican" livery

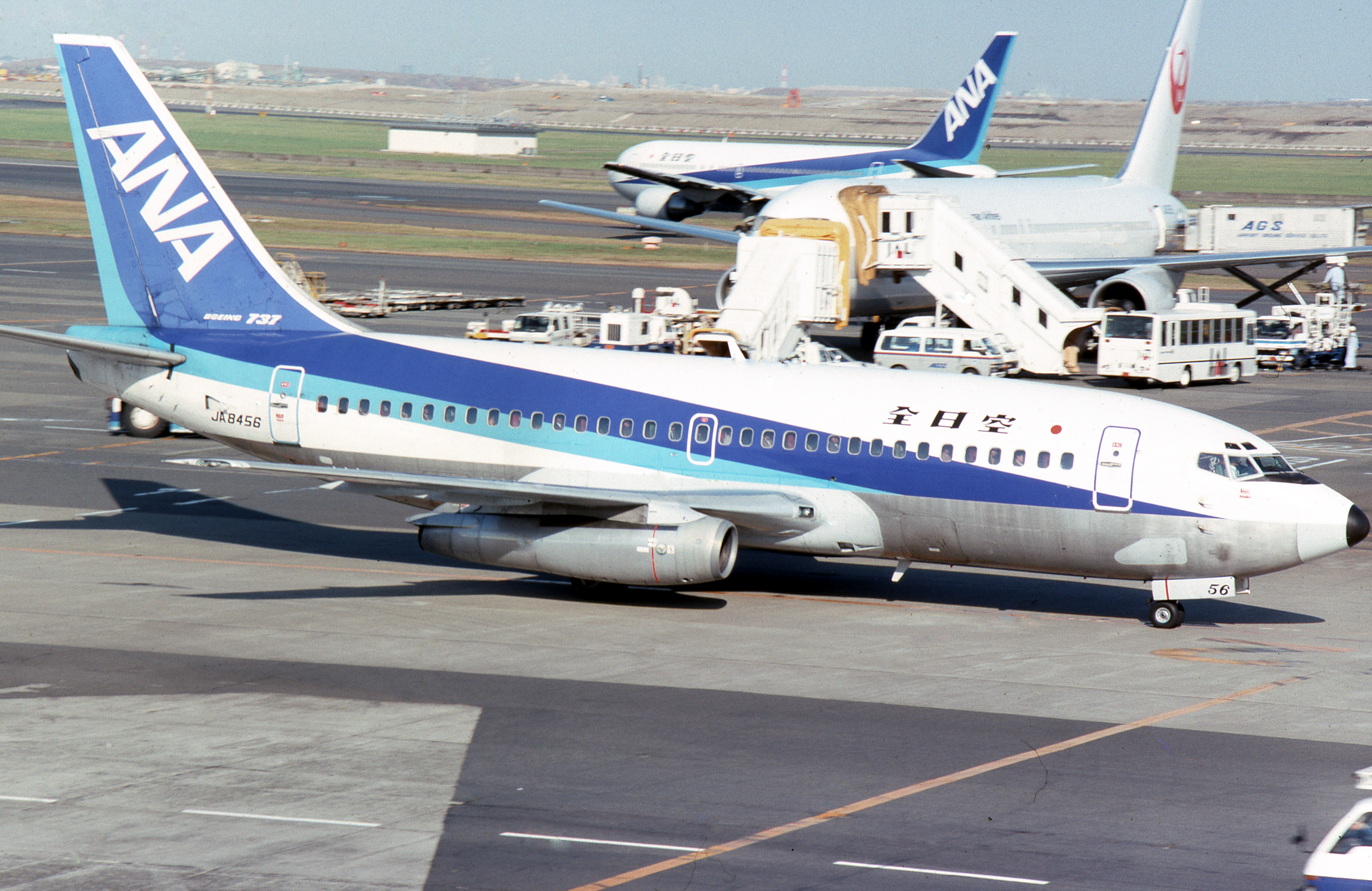
An ANA's 737-200 with original "Triton blue" livery, note the English title is absent, and the fuselage's belly is bare metal.

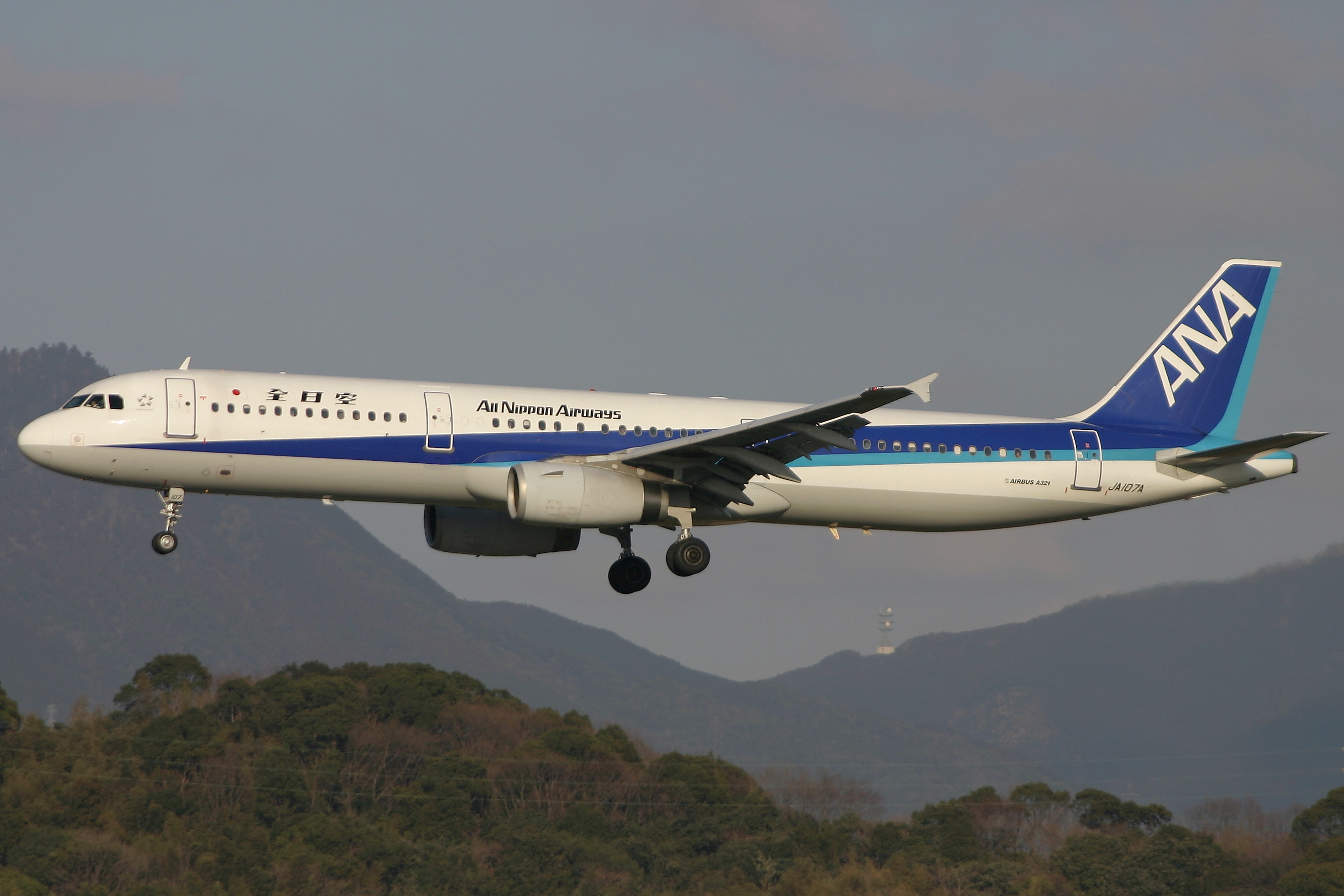
An ANA's A321 with original "Triton blue" livery

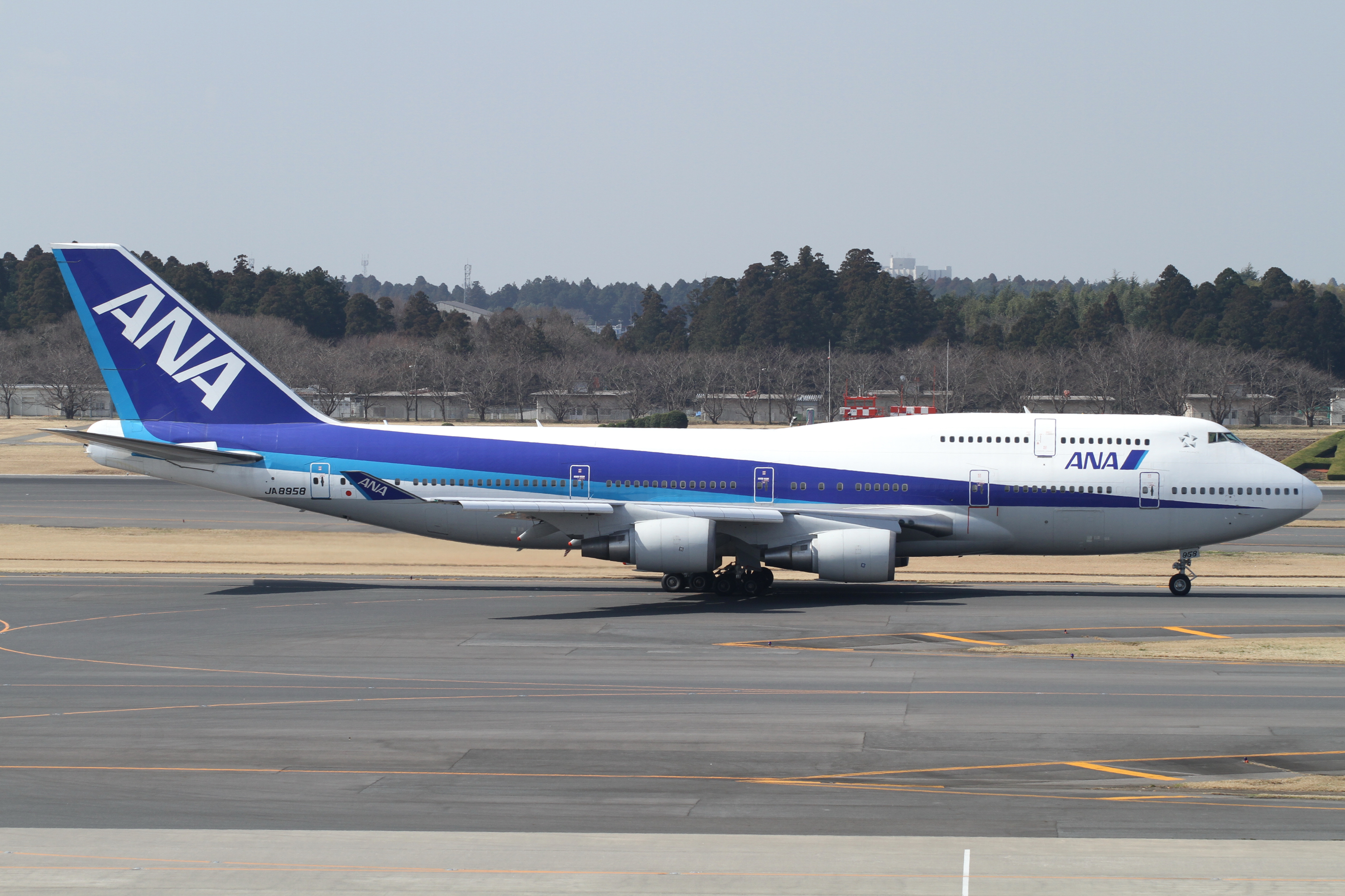
An ANA's 747-400 with first revamped "Triton blue" livery

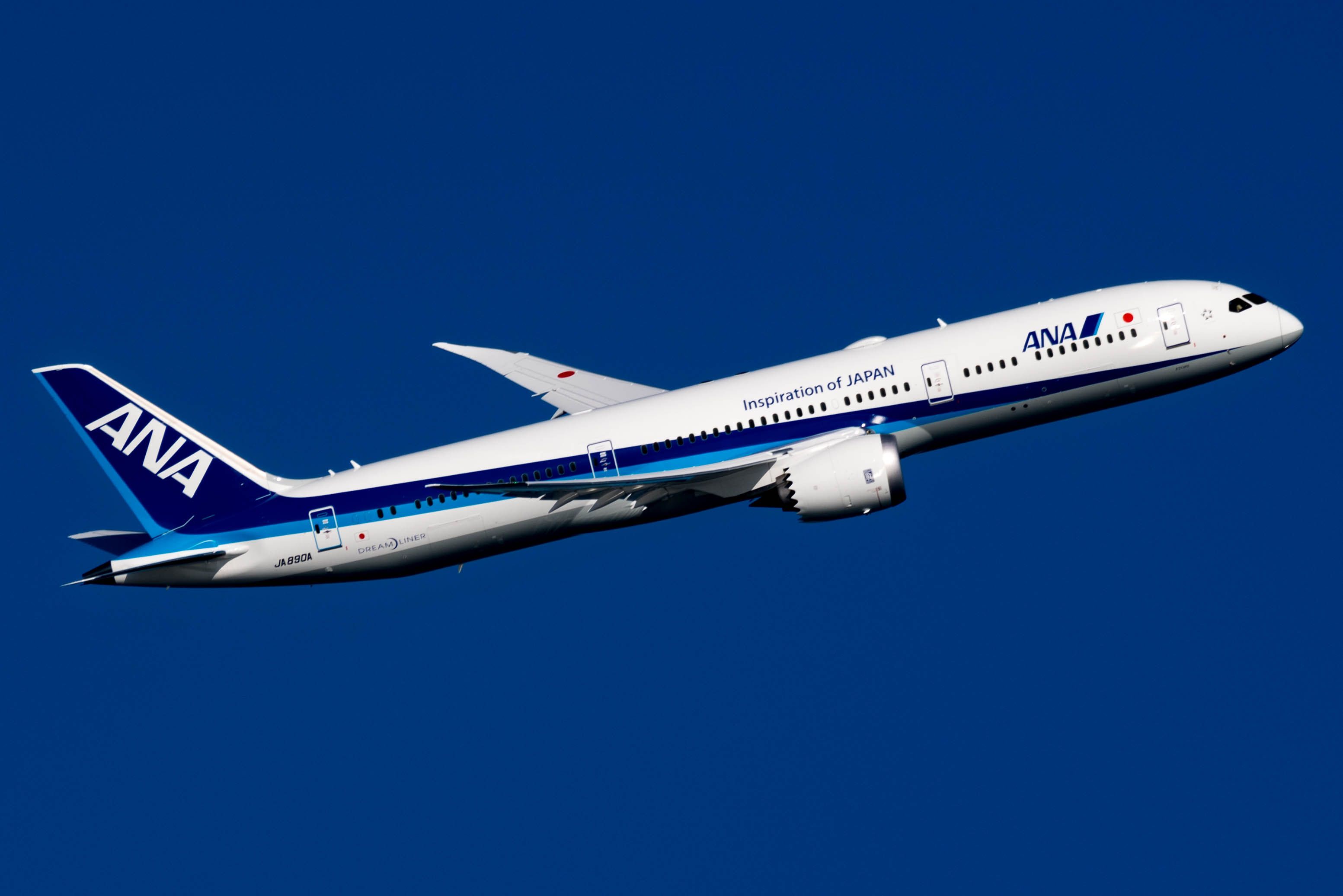
An ANA's 787-9 with second revamped "Triton blue" livery

The ANA former "Mohican" livery consists of a blue and white color scheme painted as strip sections on the fuselage, with a blue vertical stabilizer with the former ANA logo. All aircraft wearing this livery are either retired or repainted. In 2010, one Boeing 767-300 was repainted in this livery.

In 1982, ANA officially introduced the "Triton blue" livery, which has a white and grey fuselage, with a blue strip painted under the windows, and the vertical stabilizer is painted blue with the word ANA painted sideways. The Japanese flag, airline's Japanese name and full English name were painted black on top of windows at forward fuselage, while aircraft for domestic flights only have the flag and Japanese name.

Following the introduction of "Triton blue" livery, ANA revamped the livery for multiple times. After few year of original introduction, aircraft such as YS-11, 727, 737-200, and 767-200, which use bare metal belly, replaced with standard grey belly instead. In 2002, as part of airline's rebranding from 1999 to 2002 financial difficulties, ANA replaced the airline's Japanese name and full English name to just ANA logo, while the Japanese flag were moved on below the windows at rear fuselage. Since 2013, to promote "Inspiration of Japan" concept, the second Japanese flag is added before ANA logo, similar to the original livery, and slogan "Inspiration of Japan" is added after ANA logo.

Since 2002, ANA's carter and regional brands are merged their livery to ANA's, while the brand name were written in all-capital after ANA logo. Since 2013, to avoid newly added "Inspiration of Japan" slogan, the brand name were moved to the rear fuselage before the smaller Japanese flag instead.

=== Special liveries ===
Many ANA aircraft have operated in special liveries through the years:

- Seven jets in Star Alliance livery: two Boeing 777-200s, one Boeing 777-300ER, one Boeing 767-300ER, one Boeing 767-300, one Boeing 737-800 and one Boeing 787-9
- Twelve Pokémon-themed jets: five Boeing 747-400s, four Boeing 767-300, one Boeing 777-300, one Boeing 777-300ER and one Boeing 787-9
- Four Star Wars-themed jets: one Boeing 787-9 in an R2-D2 livery; one Boeing 777-300ER in a BB-8 livery; one Boeing 767-300ER in a mixed R2-D2 and BB-8 livery; and one Boeing 777-200ER in a C-3PO livery.
- All three Airbus A380-800s in ANA Flying Honu liveries (honu meaning 'sea turtle' in Hawaiian)
- Six Demon Slayer: Kimetsu no Yaiba-themed jets: two Boeing 767-300ERs, one Boeing 777-200ER from the main airline, and three De Havilland Canada DHC-8 400s from the regional subsidiary ANA Wings.
- Two Boeing 787s and one De Havilland Canada DHC-8 400 painted in ANA Future Promise livery to promote sustainable flying.
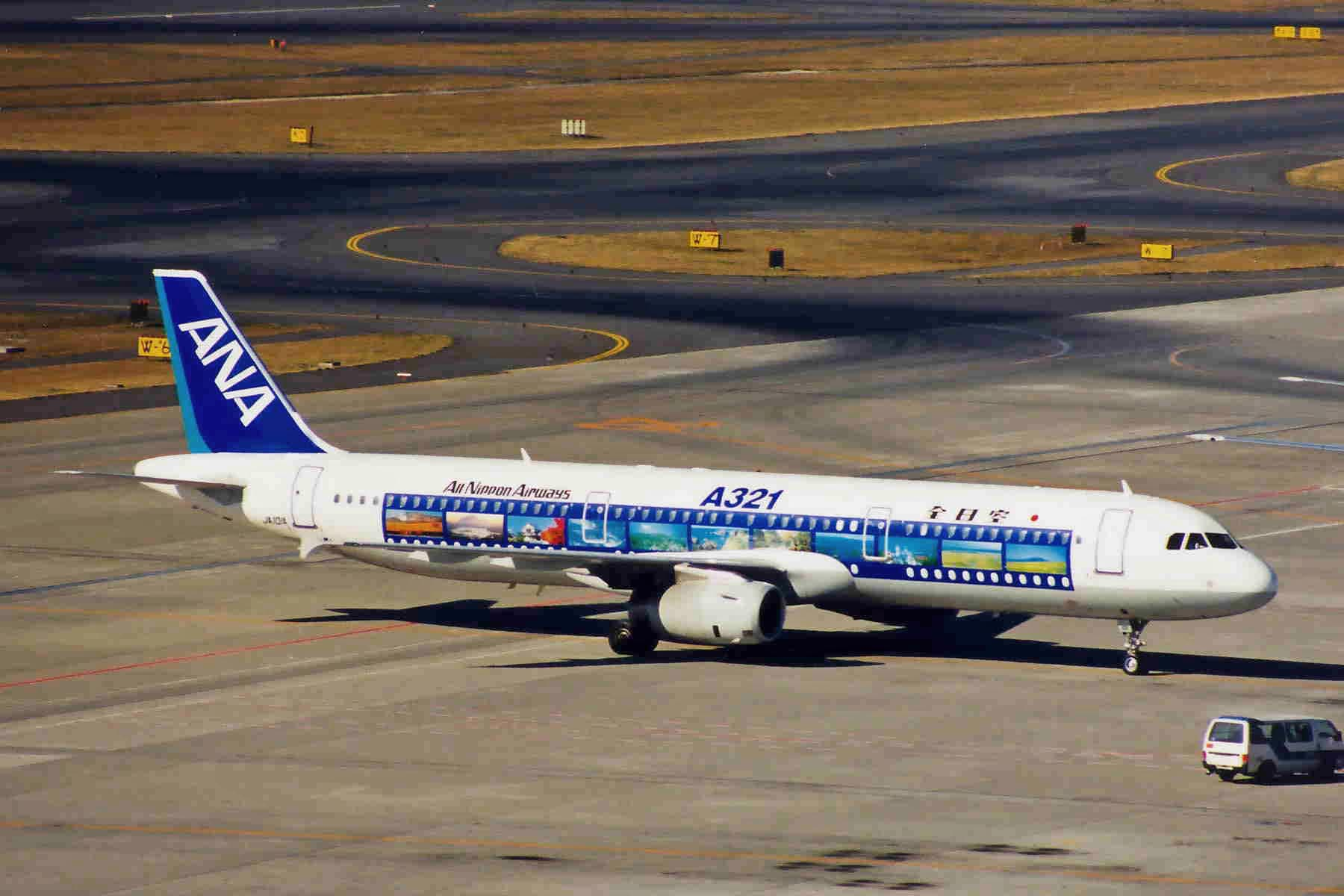
Airbus A321-100 in Landscape of Japan livery

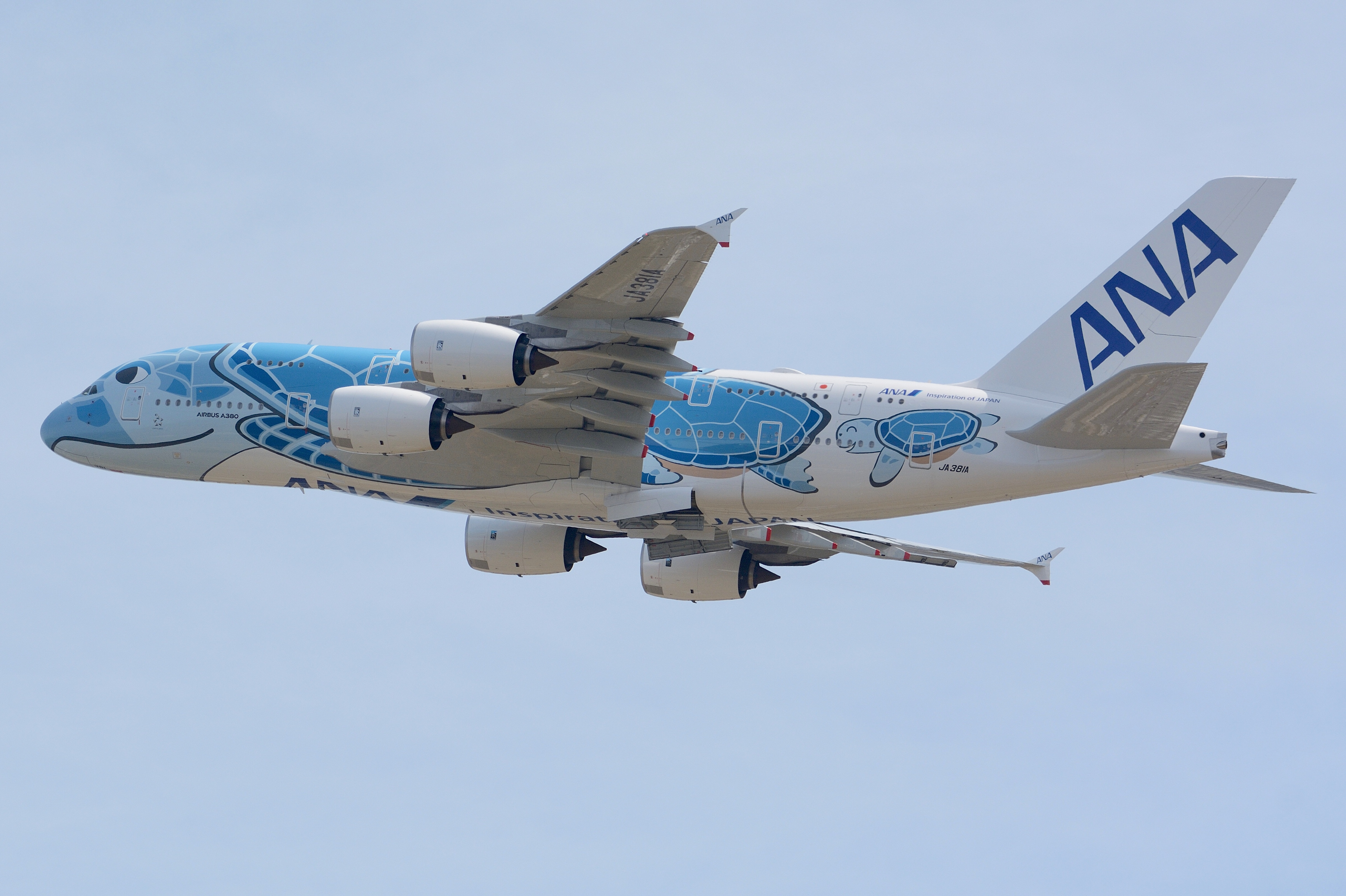
Airbus A380-800 in Flying Honu livery

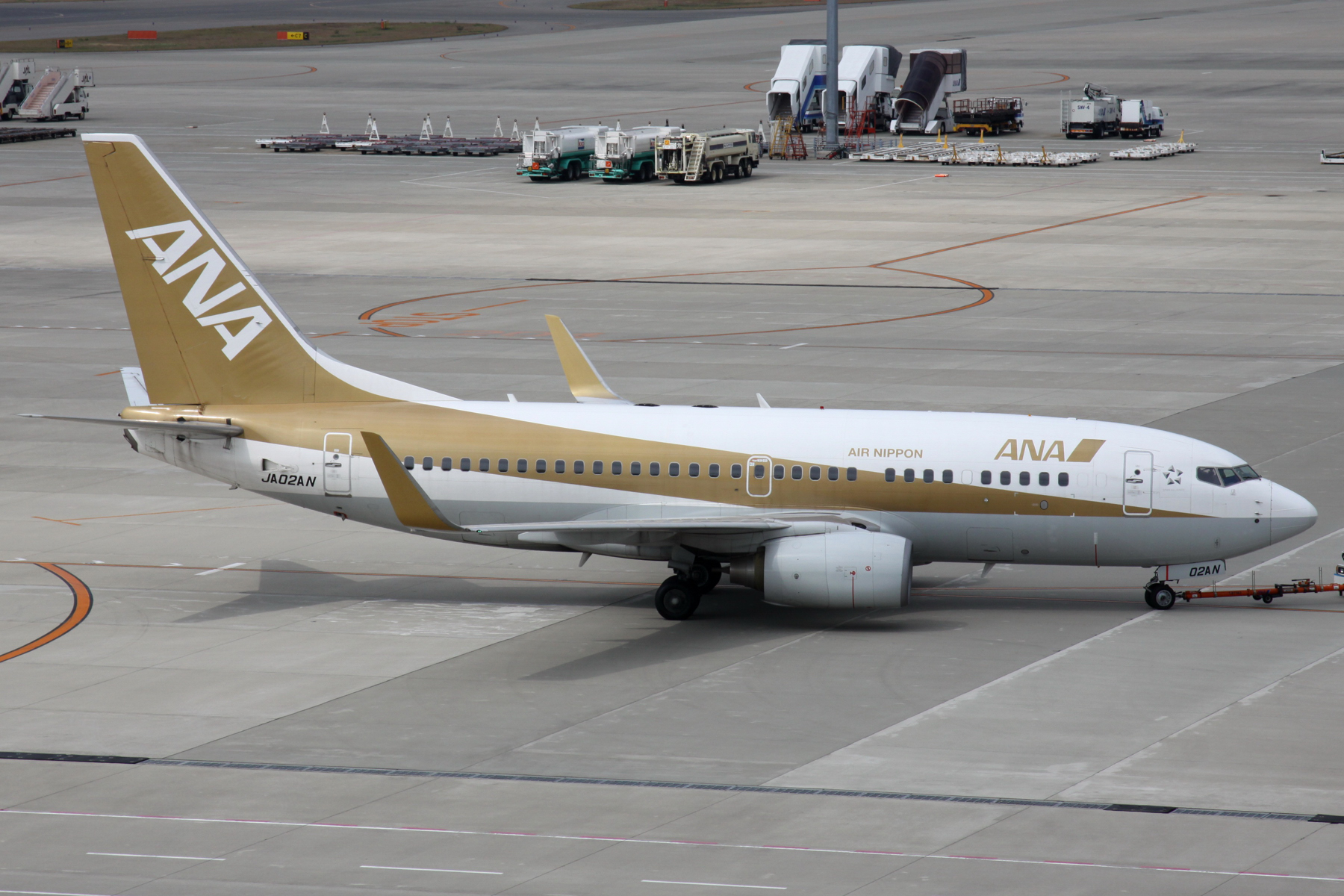
Boeing 737-700 in Gold Jet livery

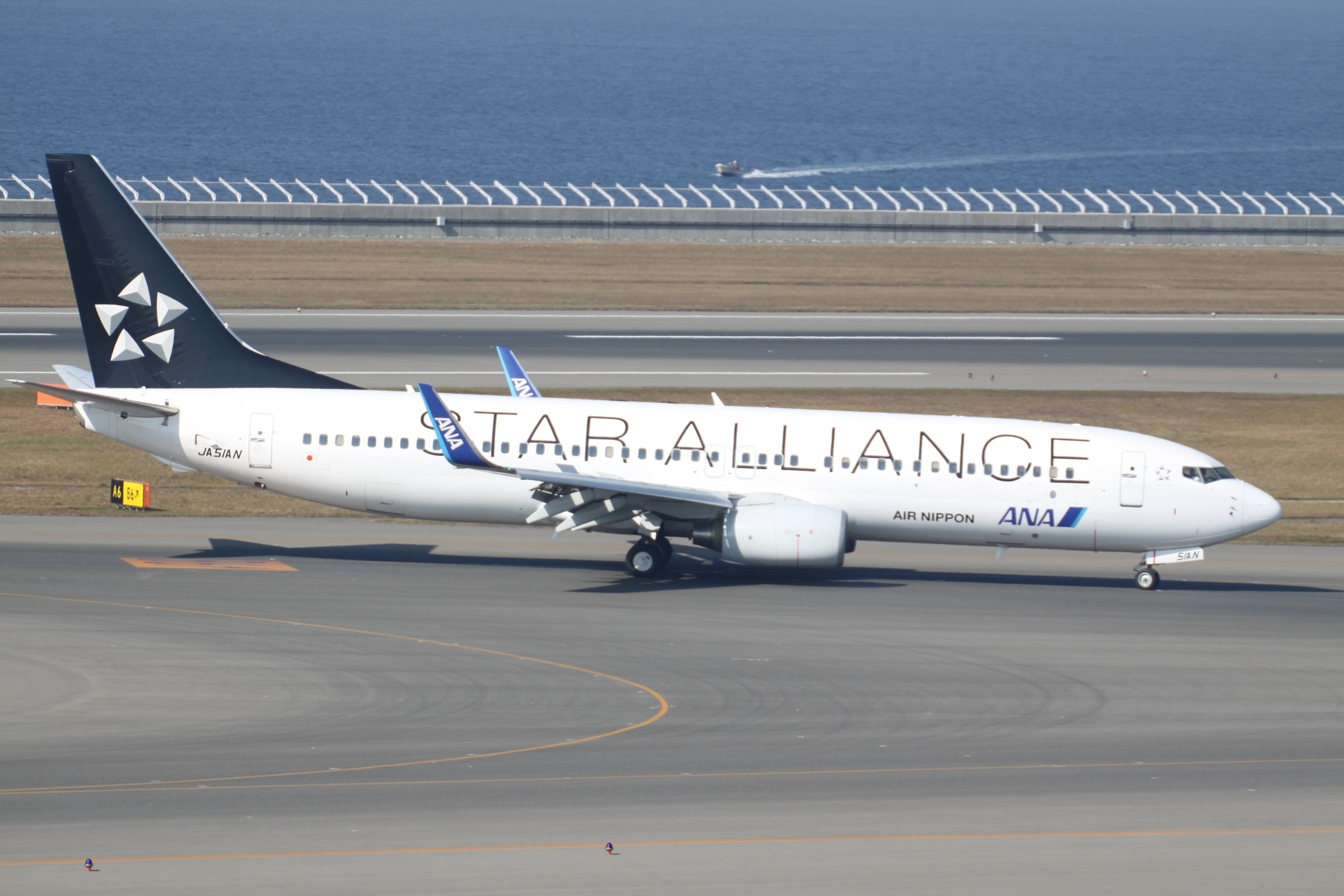
Boeing 737-800 in Star Alliance livery

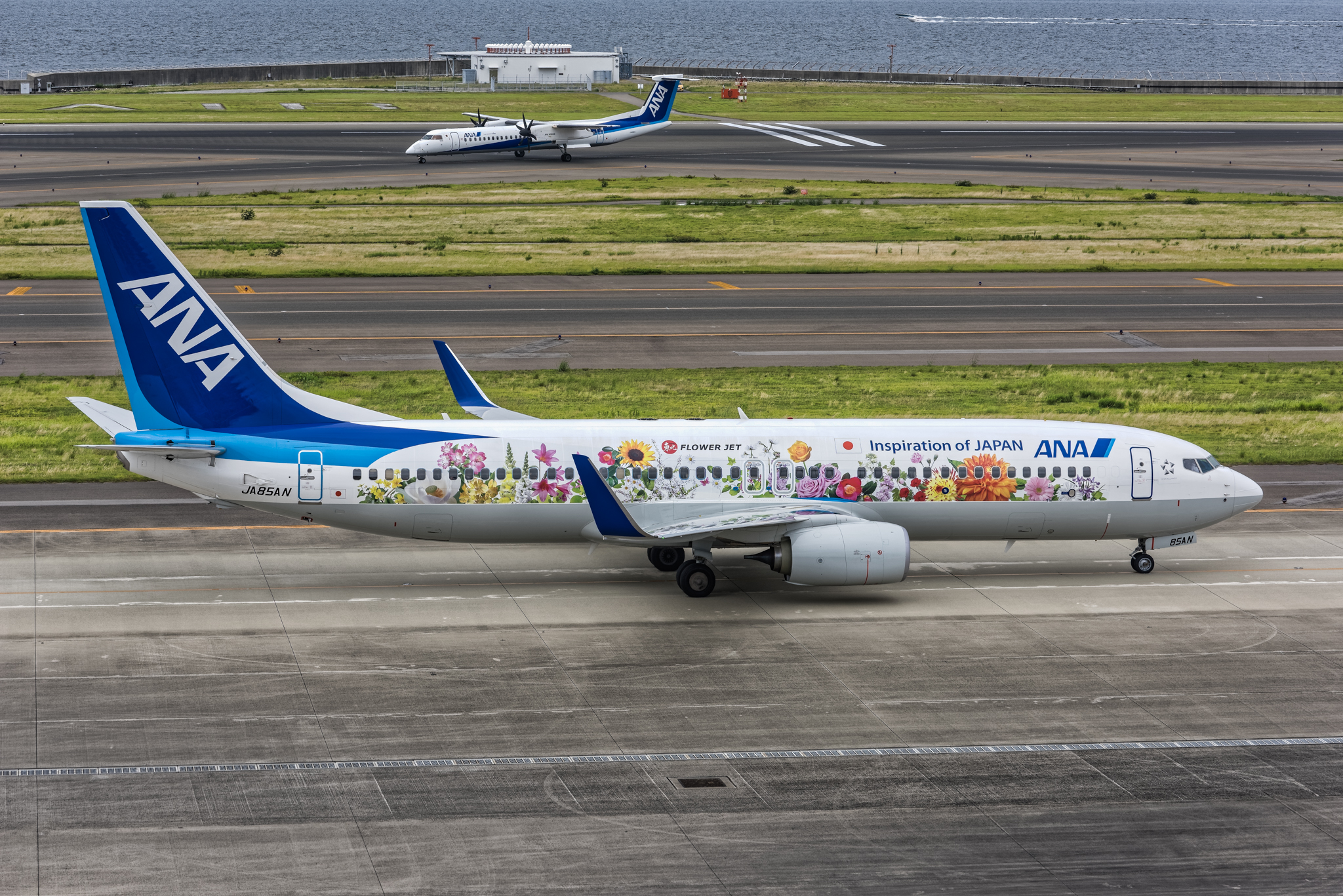
Boeing 737-800 in Tohoku Flower Jet livery

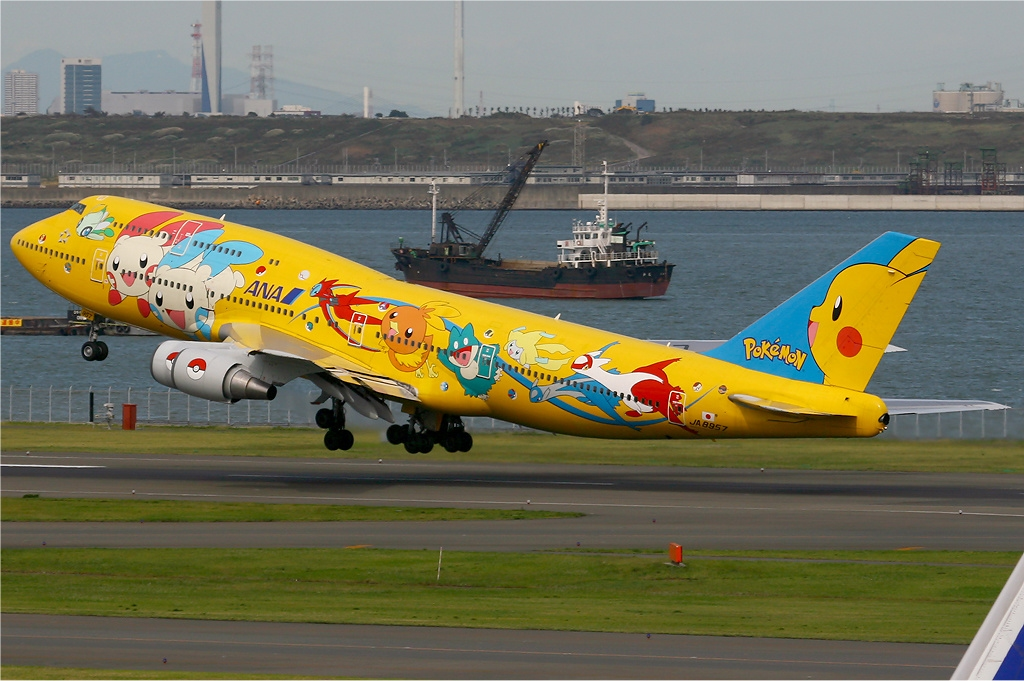
Boeing 747-400 in special Yellow Pokémon (Hoenn) livery

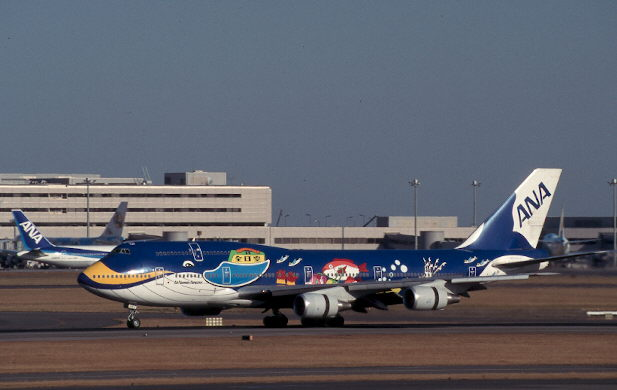
Boeing 747-400D in Marine Jumbo livery

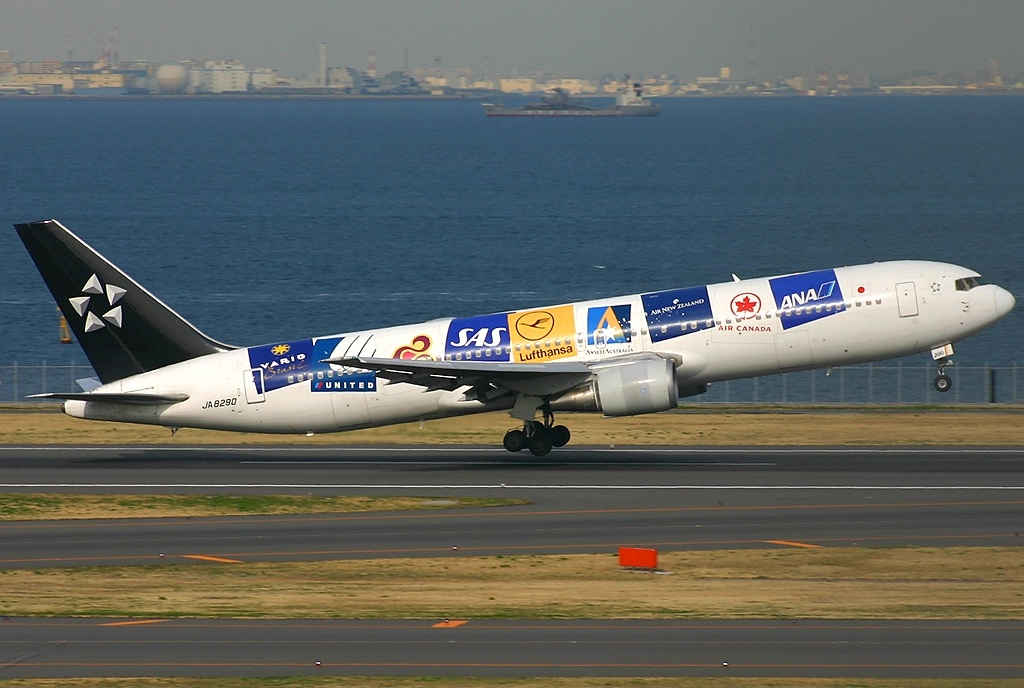
Boeing 767-300 in Star Alliance livery

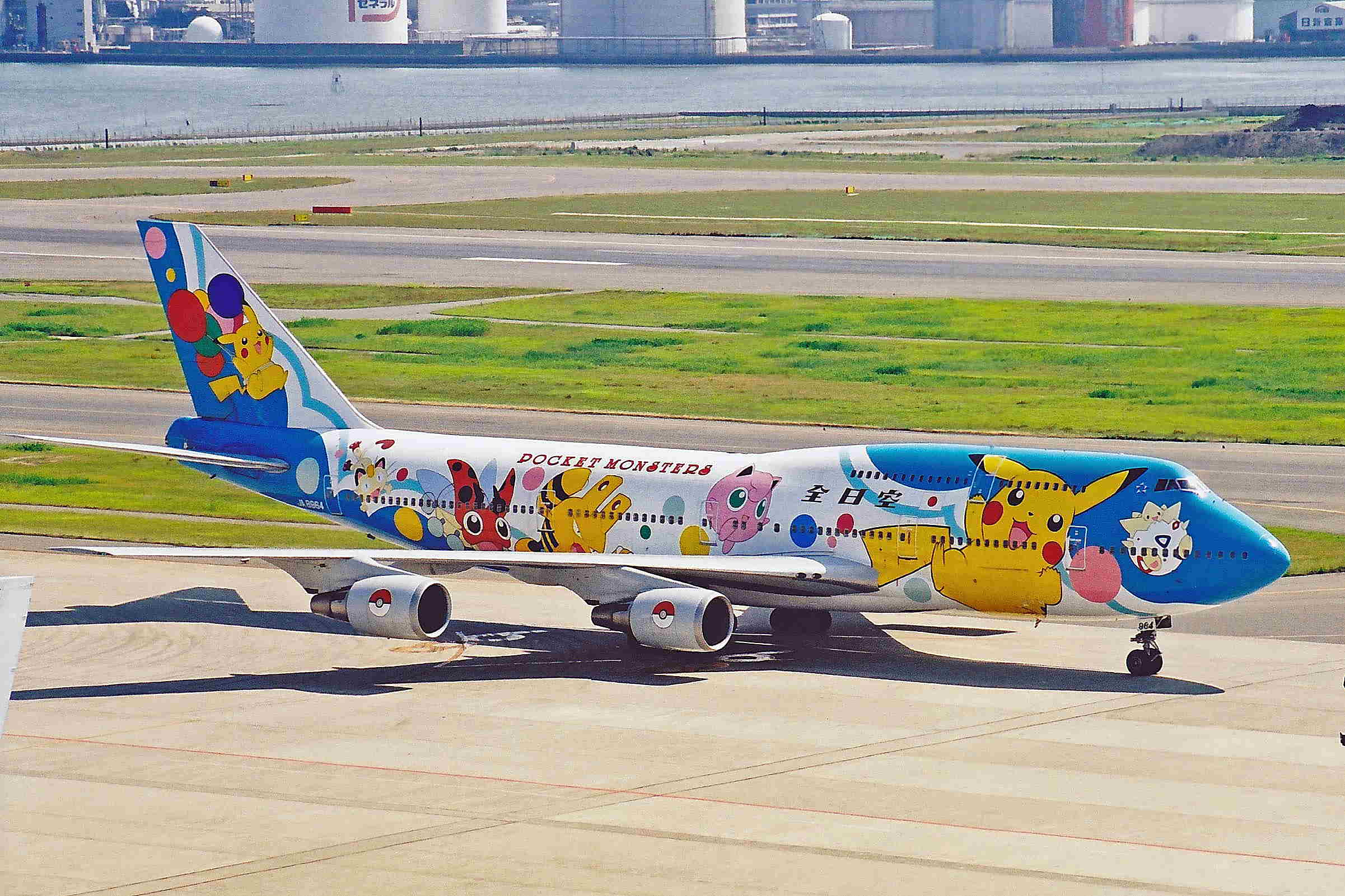
Boeing 747-400D in Pokémon Pocket Monsters livery

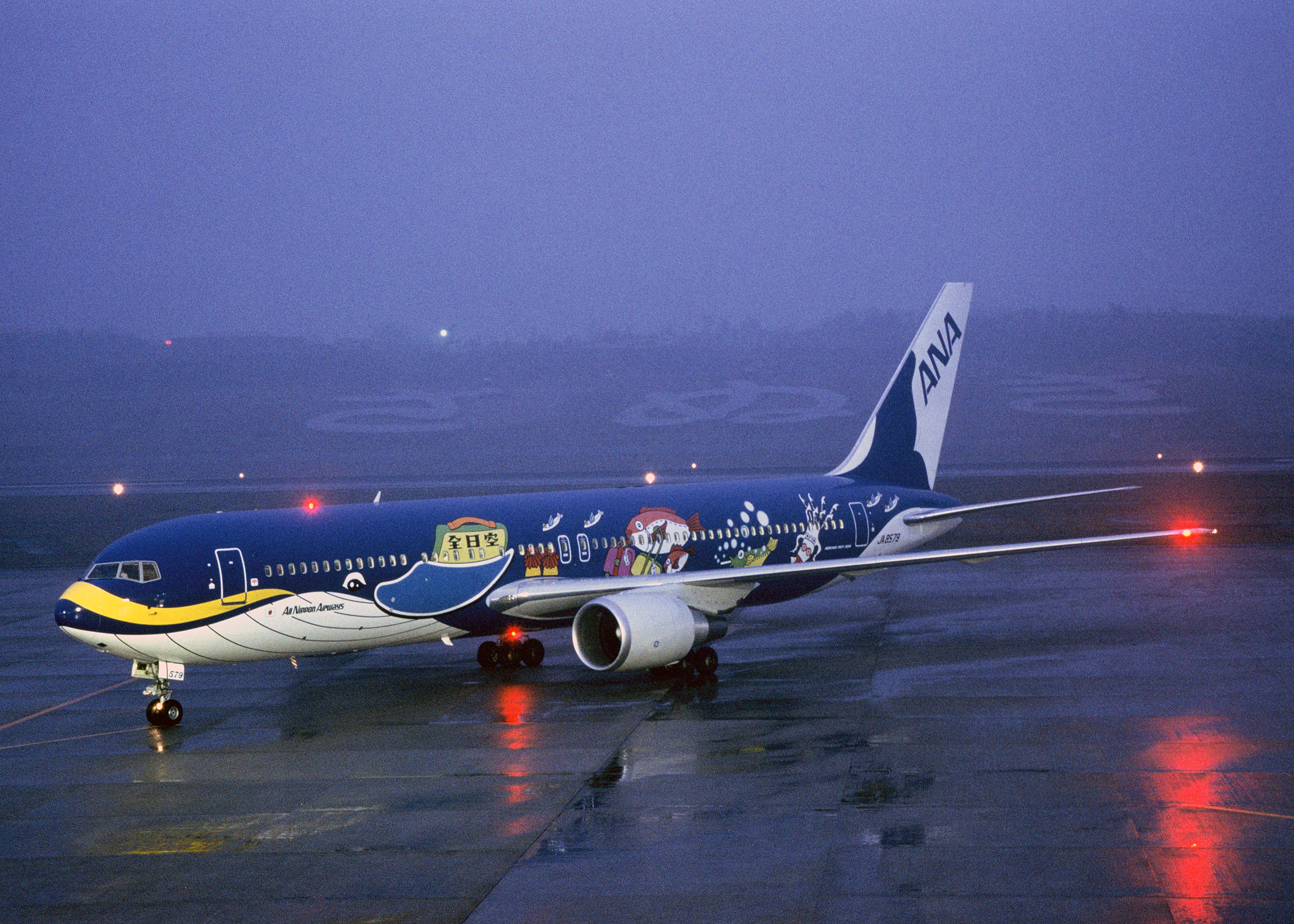
Boeing 767-300 in Marine Jumbo Jr livery

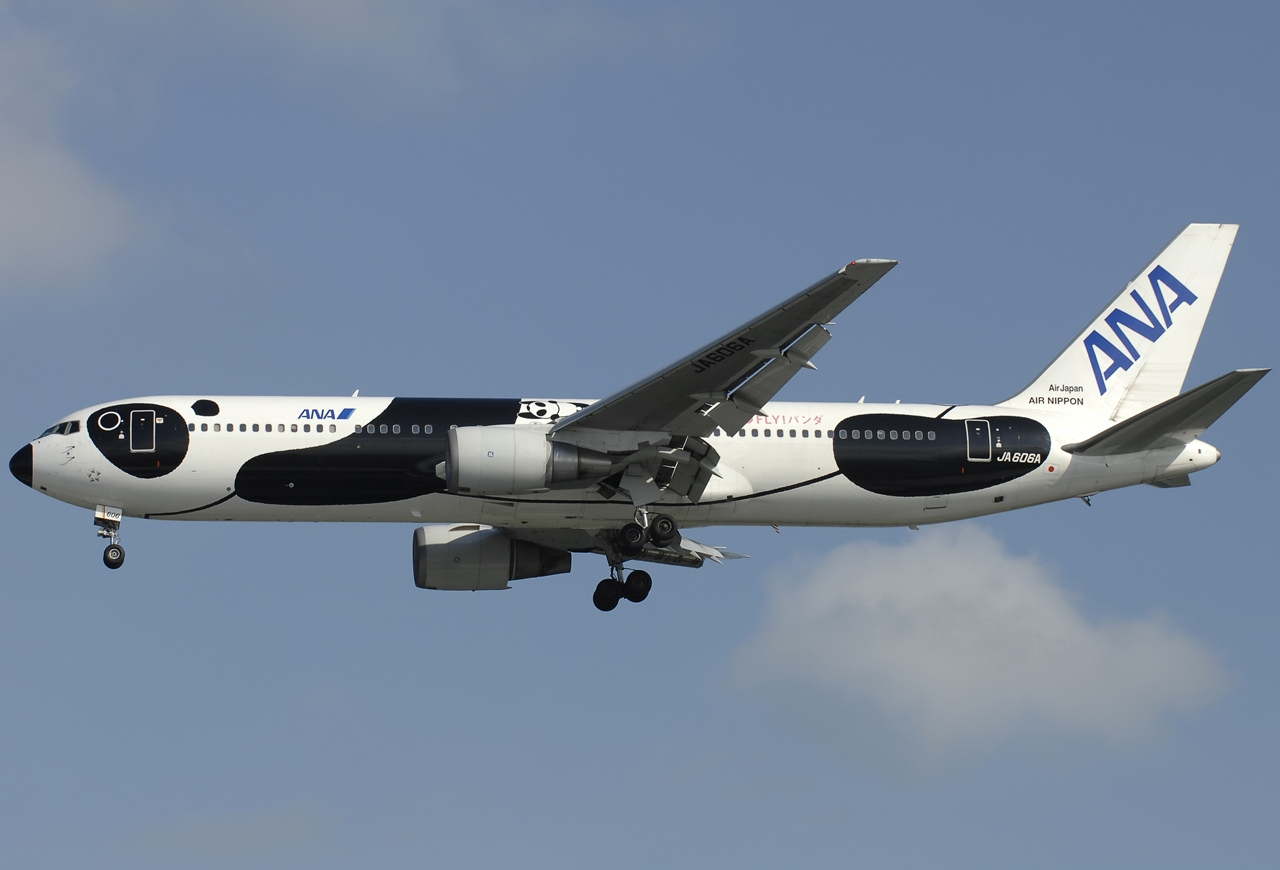
ANA Boeing 767-300ER in panda livery

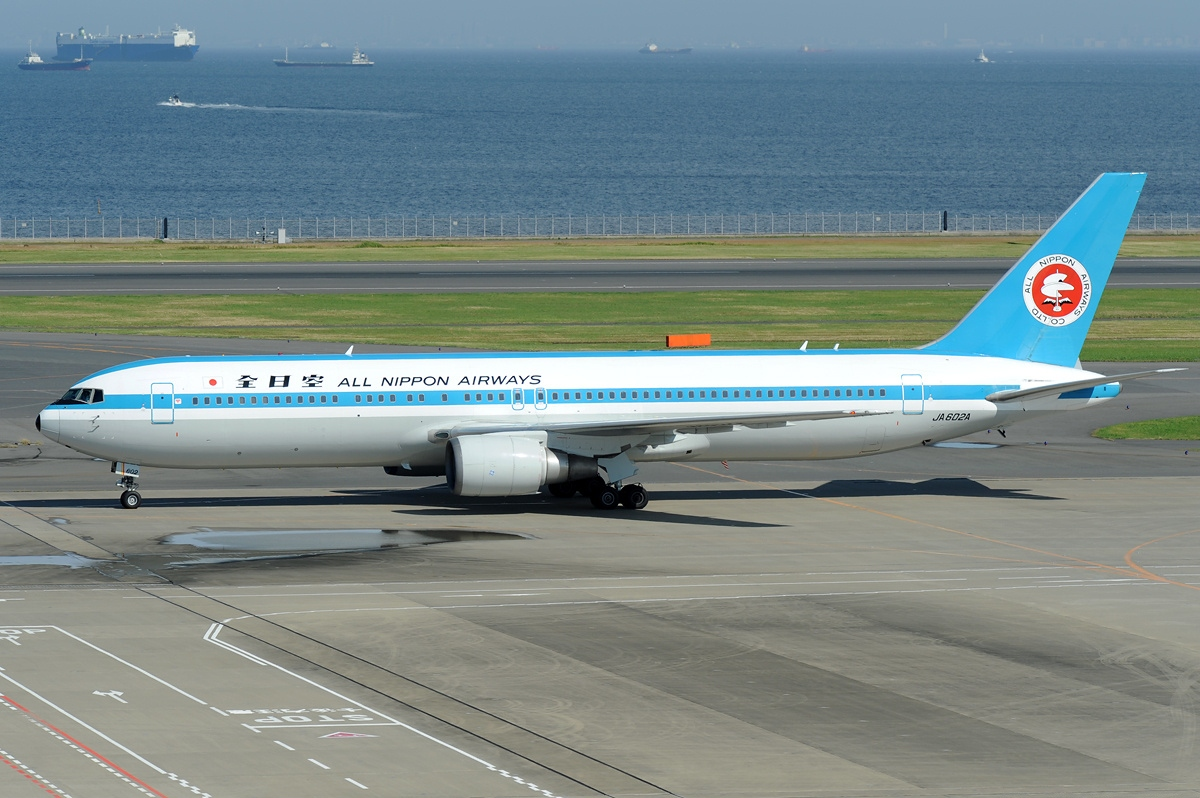
Boeing 767-300 in Retro livery

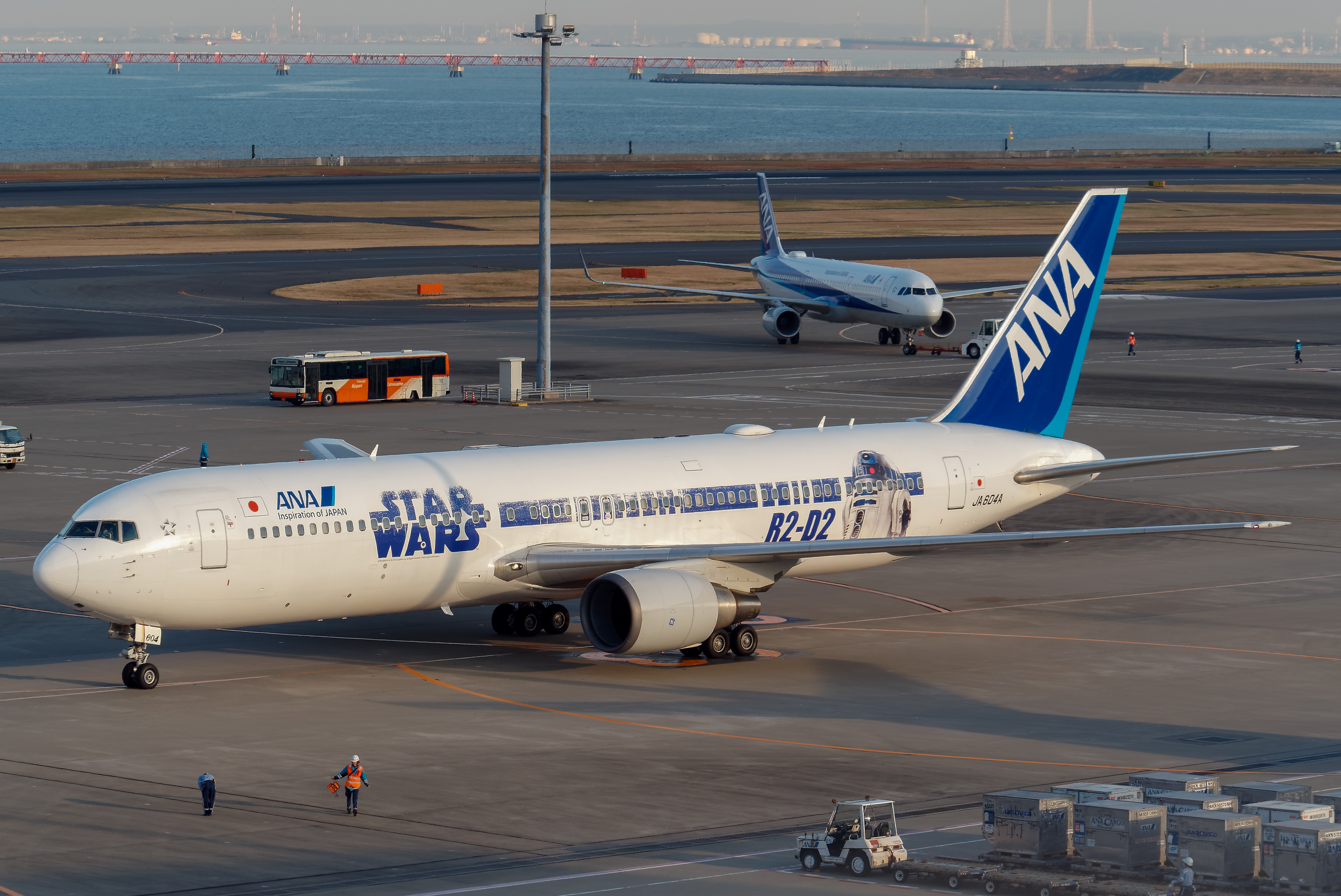
Boeing 767-300ER in Star Wars livery

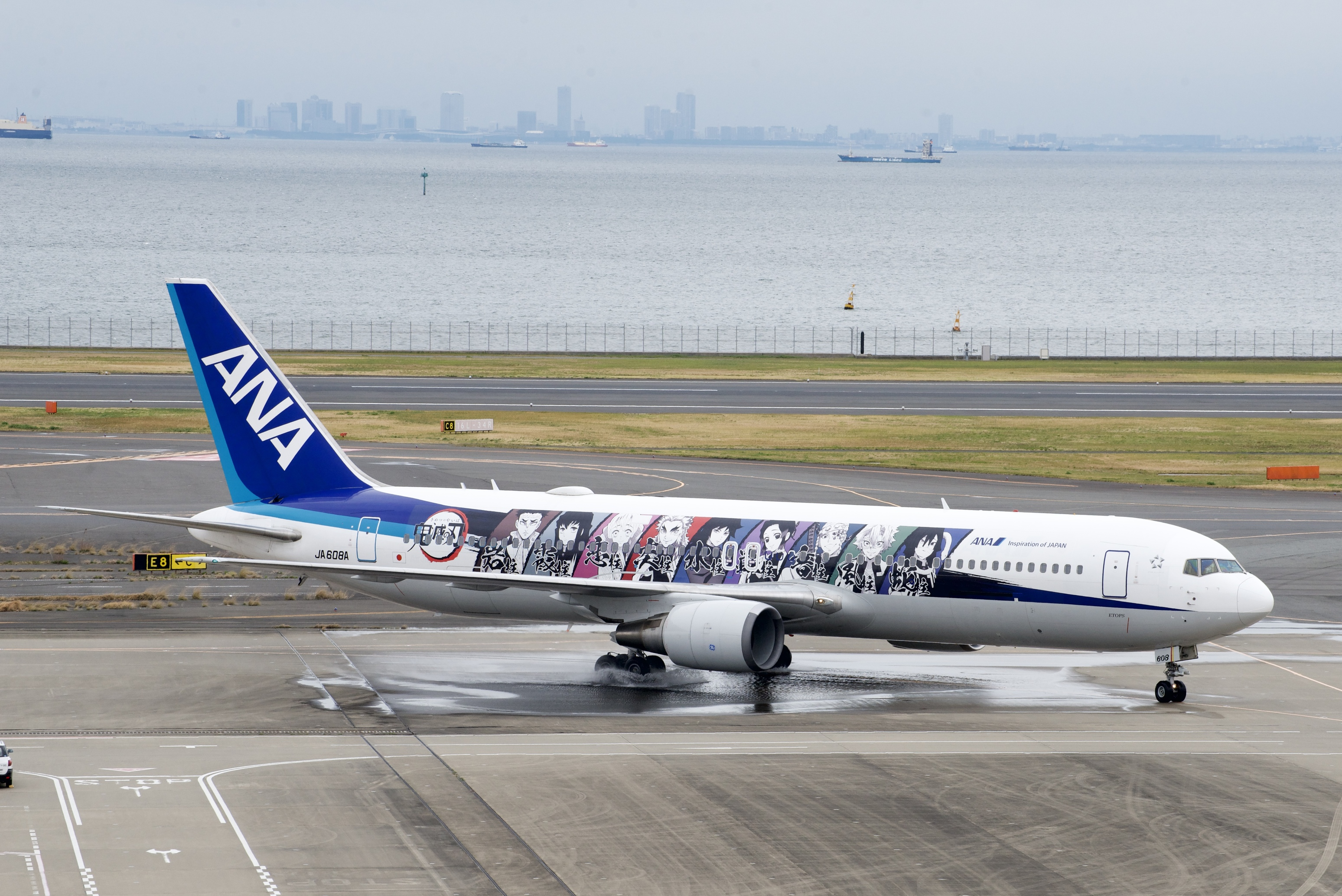
Boeing 767-300ER in Demon Slayer: Kimetsu no Yaiba livery

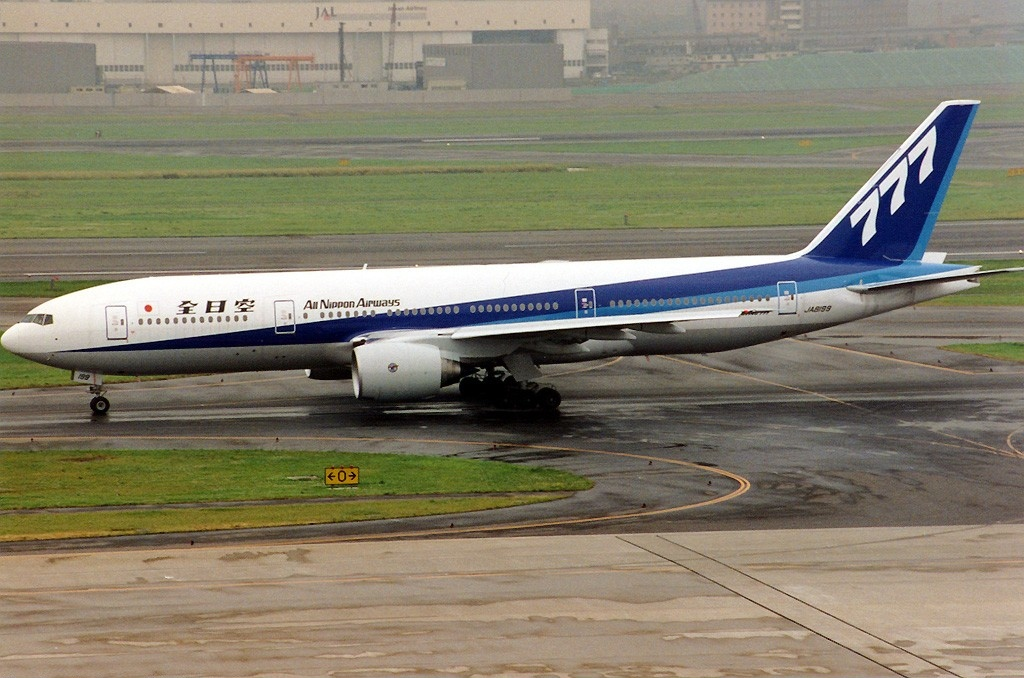
Boeing 777-200 in 777 livery

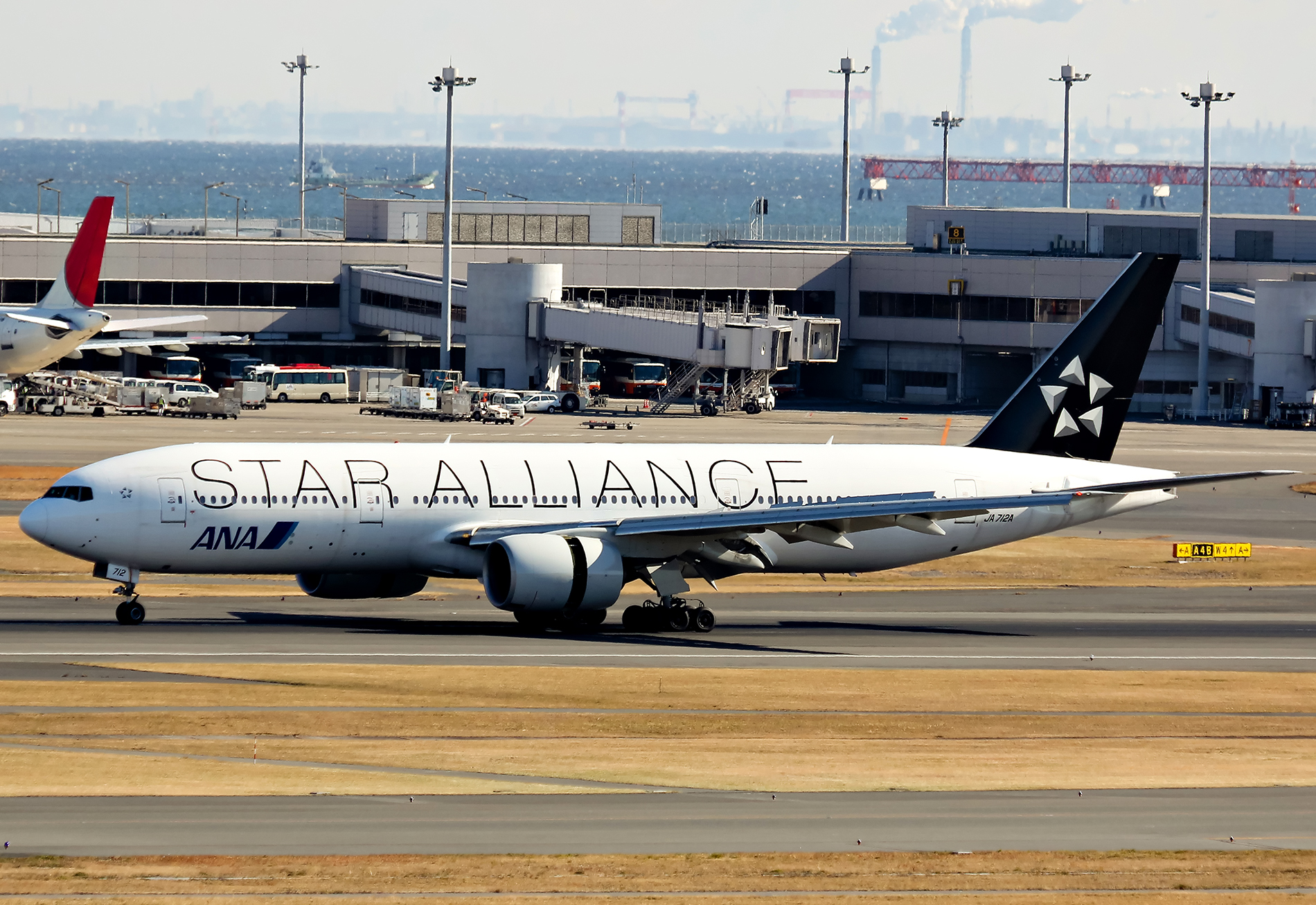
ANA Boeing 777-200 in Star Alliance livery

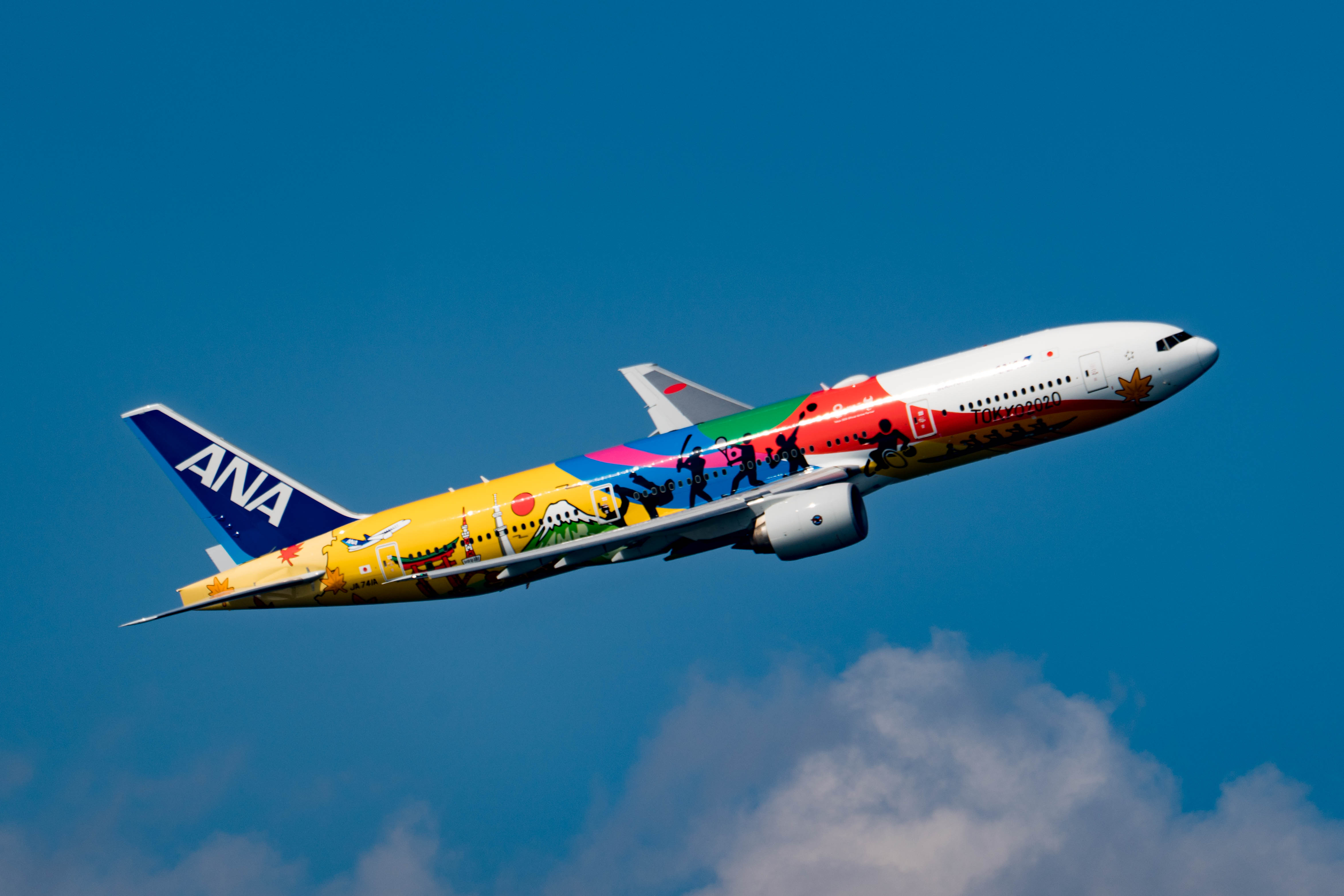
Boeing 777-200ER in The New Tokyo 2020 livery

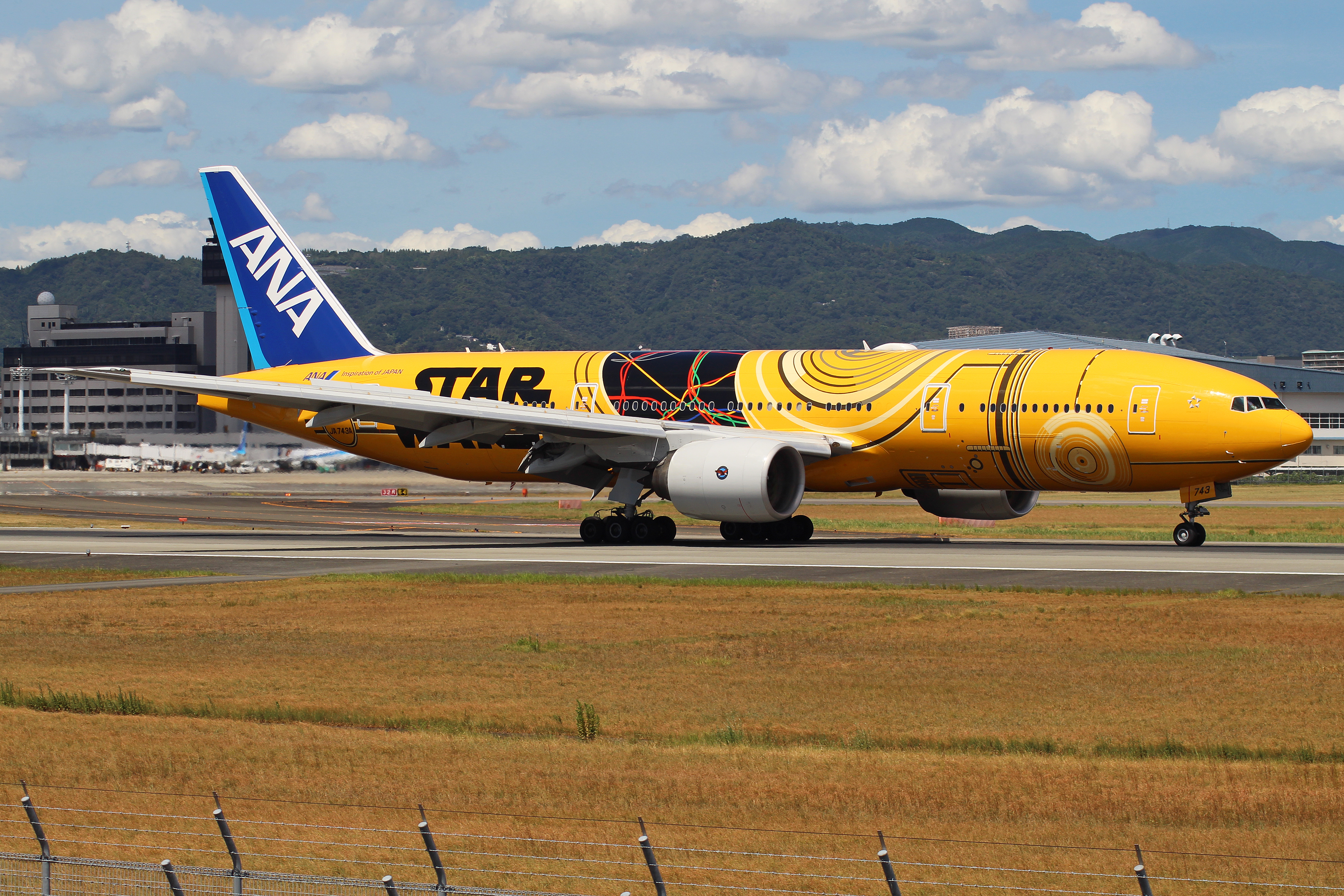
Boeing 777-200ER in Star Wars C-3PO livery

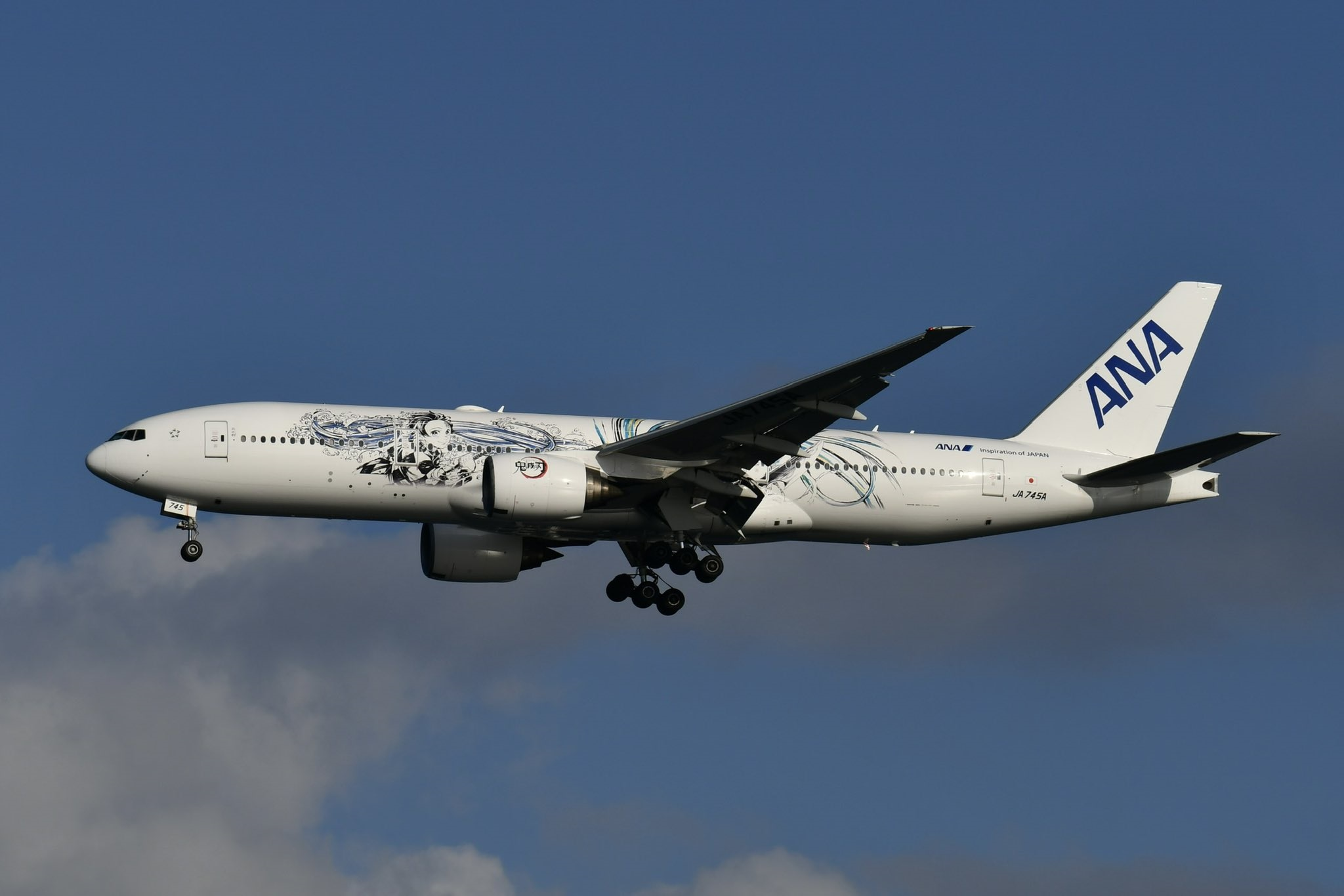
Boeing 777-200ER in Demon Slayer: Kimetsu no Yaiba livery

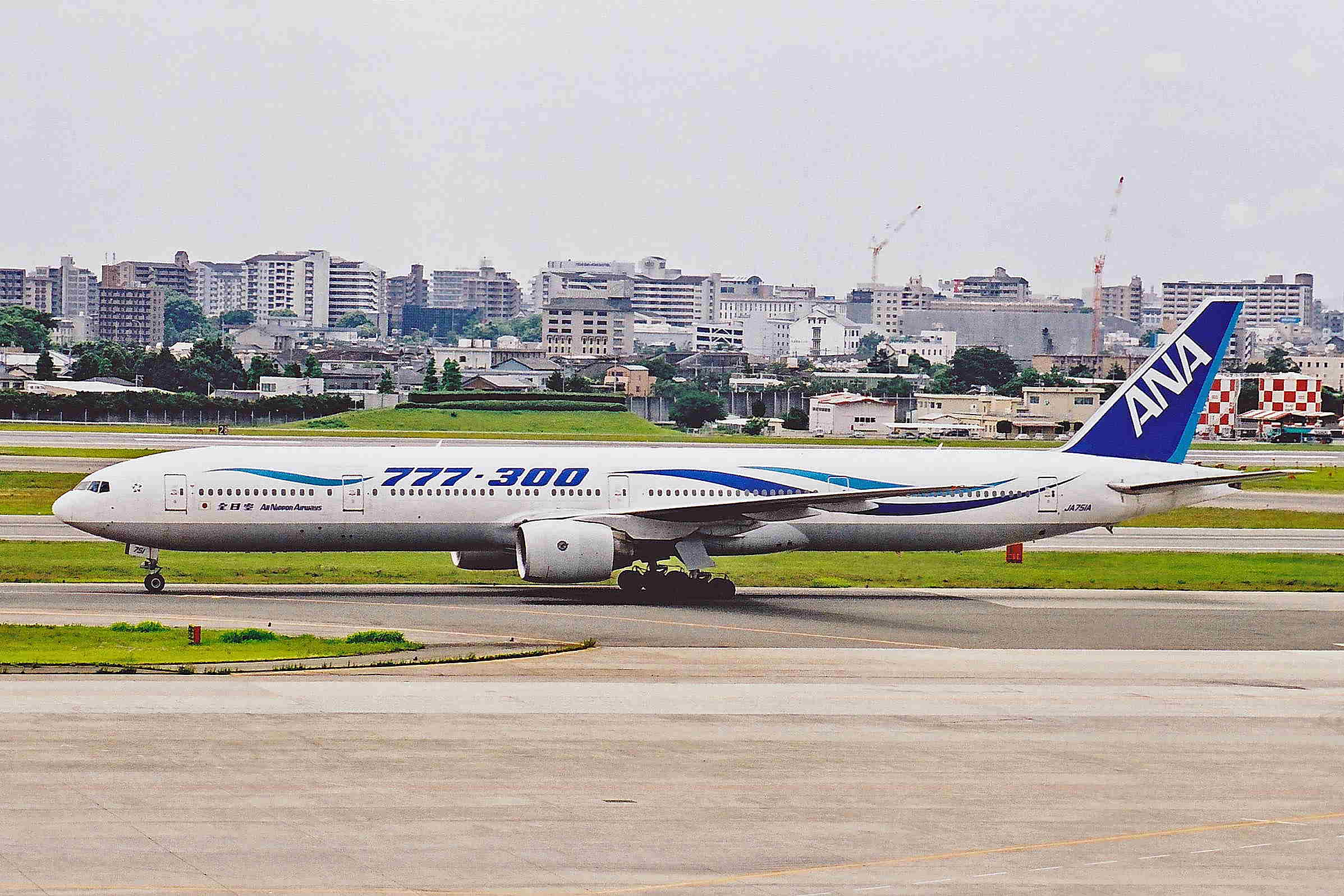
Boeing 777-300 in "Wind" livery

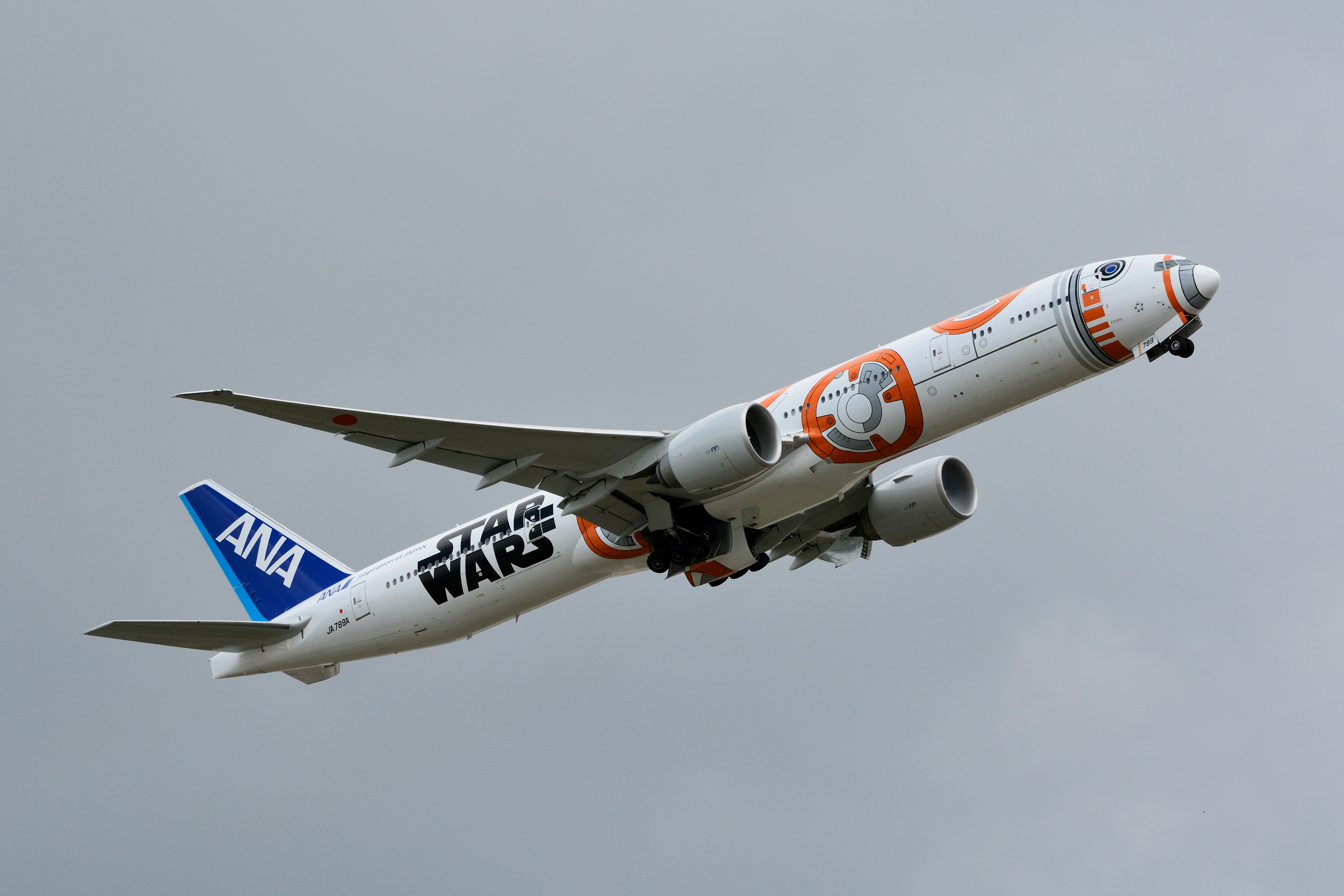
Boeing 777-300ER in Star Wars BB-8 livery

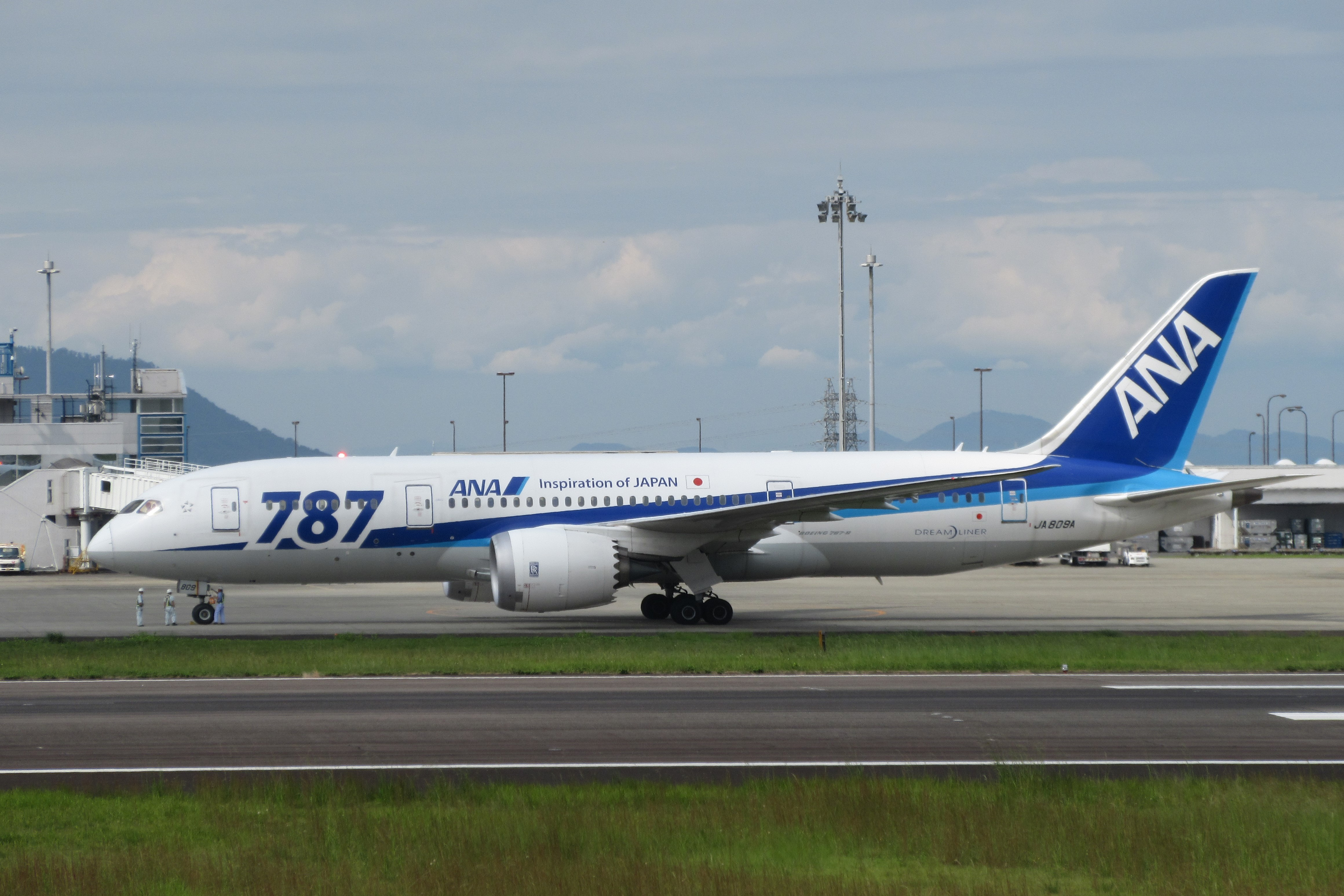
Boeing 787-8 in special 787 launch livery

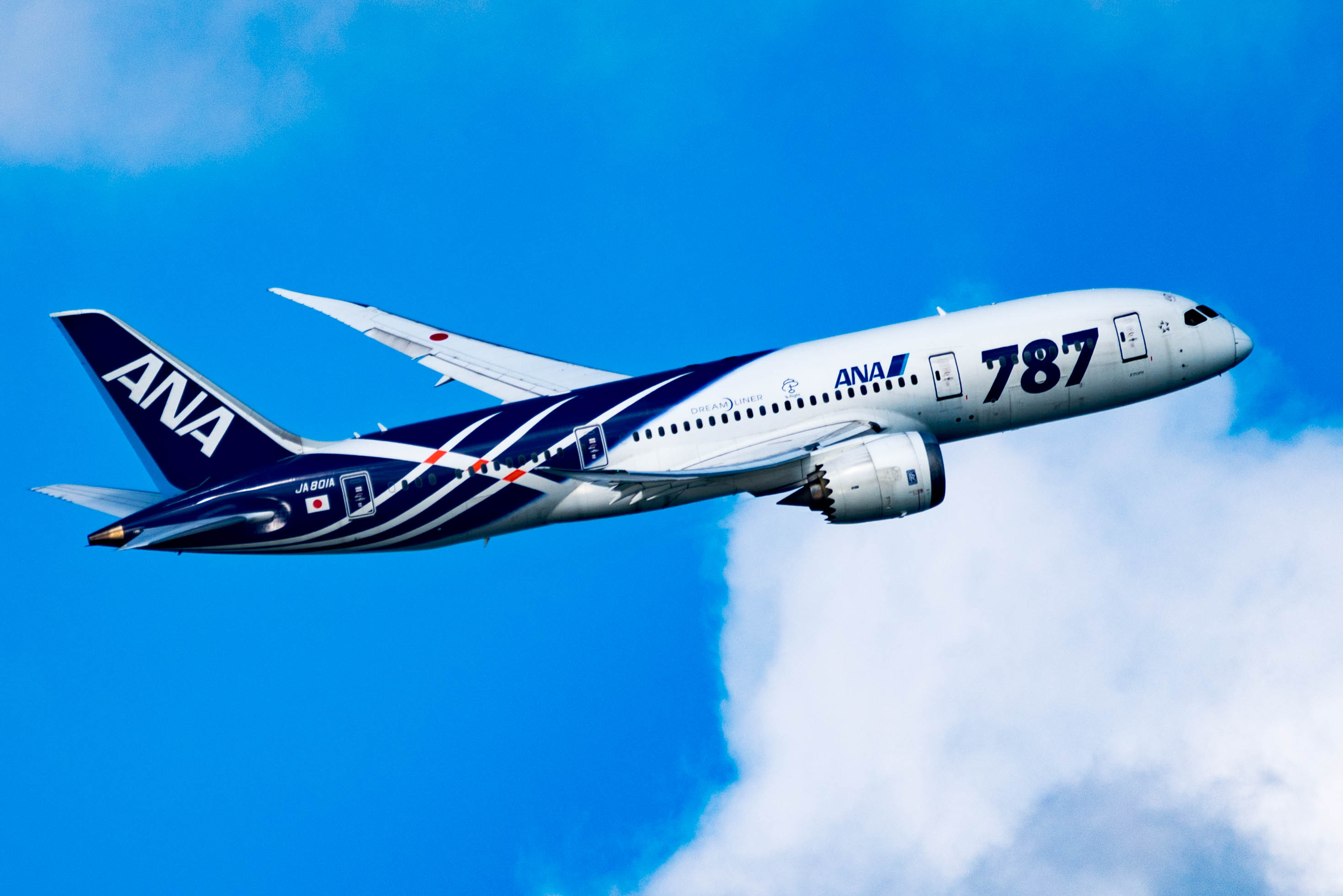
Boeing 787-8 in special 787 launch livery

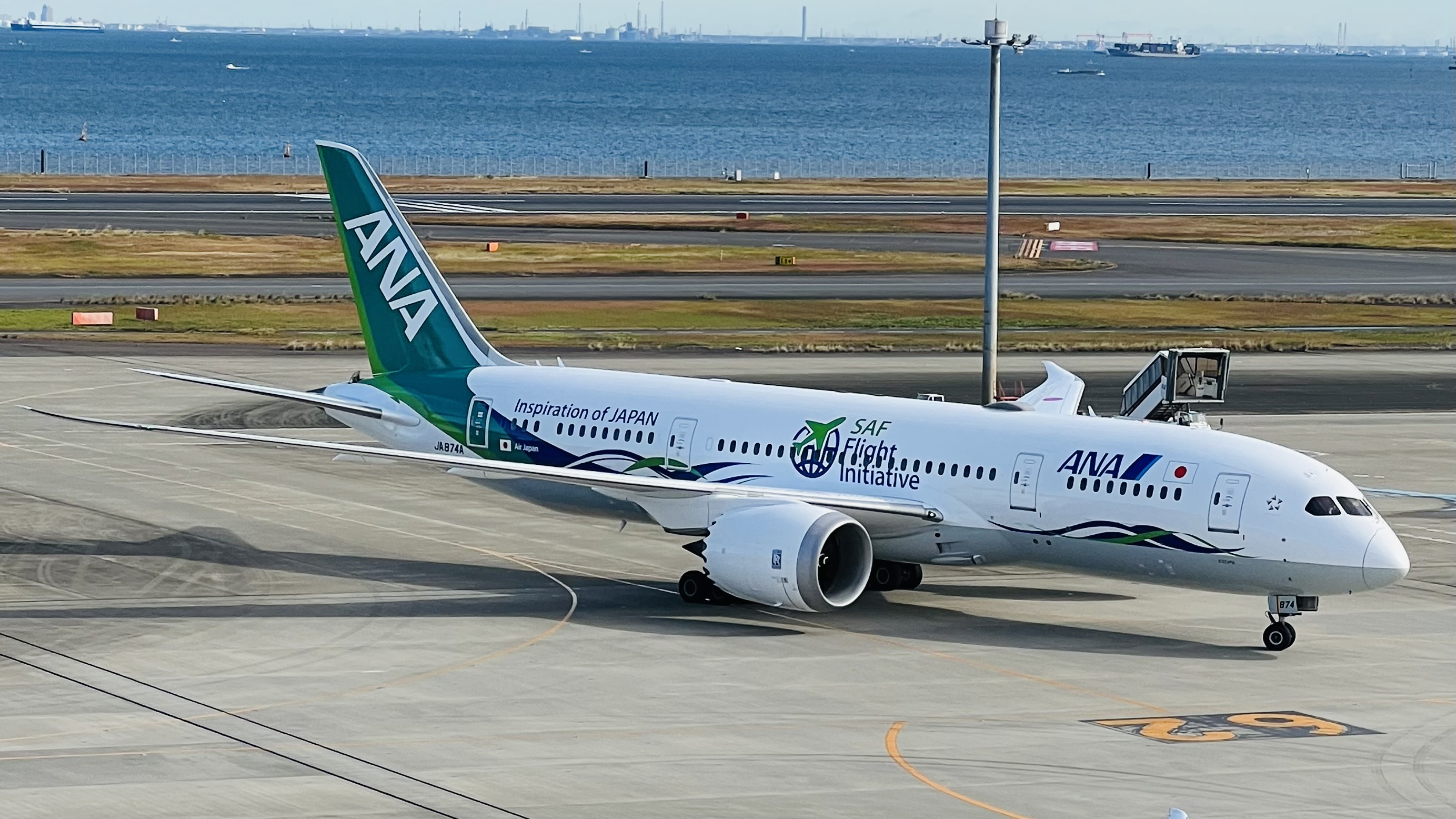
Boeing 787-8 in Future Promise livery

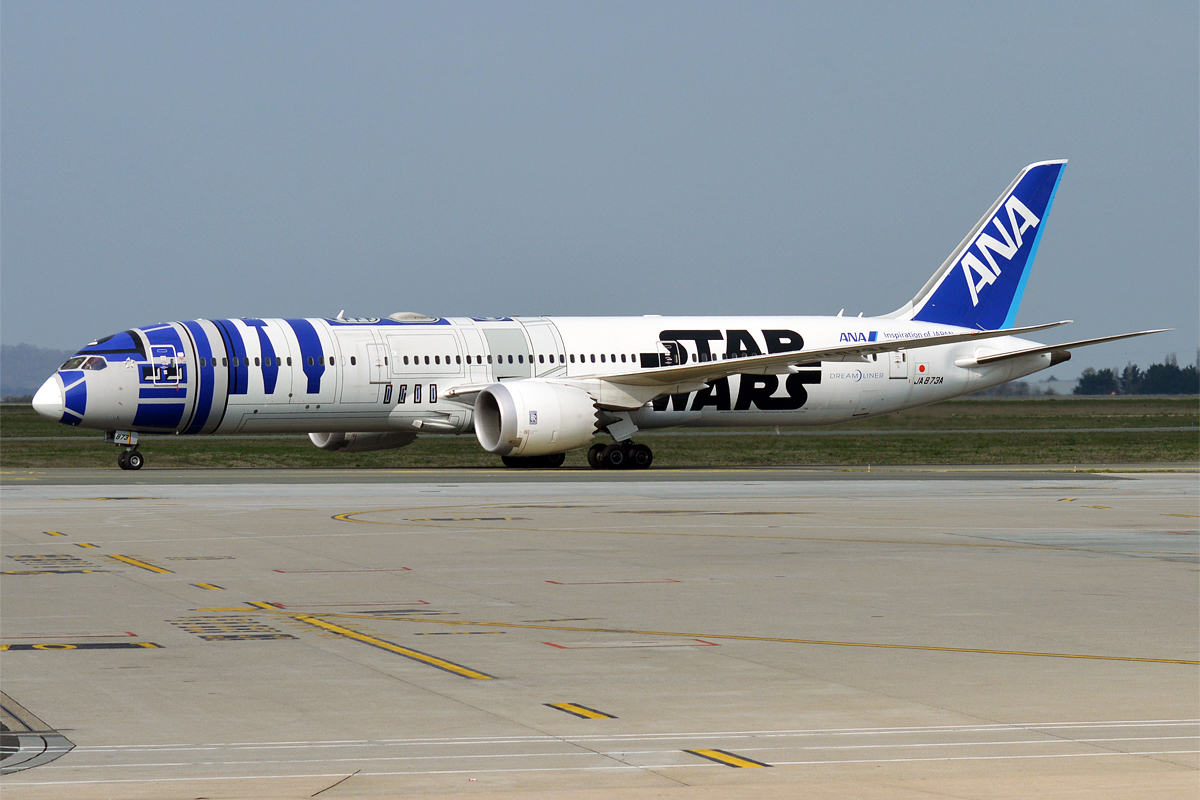
Boeing 787-9 Dreamliner in Star Wars R2-D2 livery

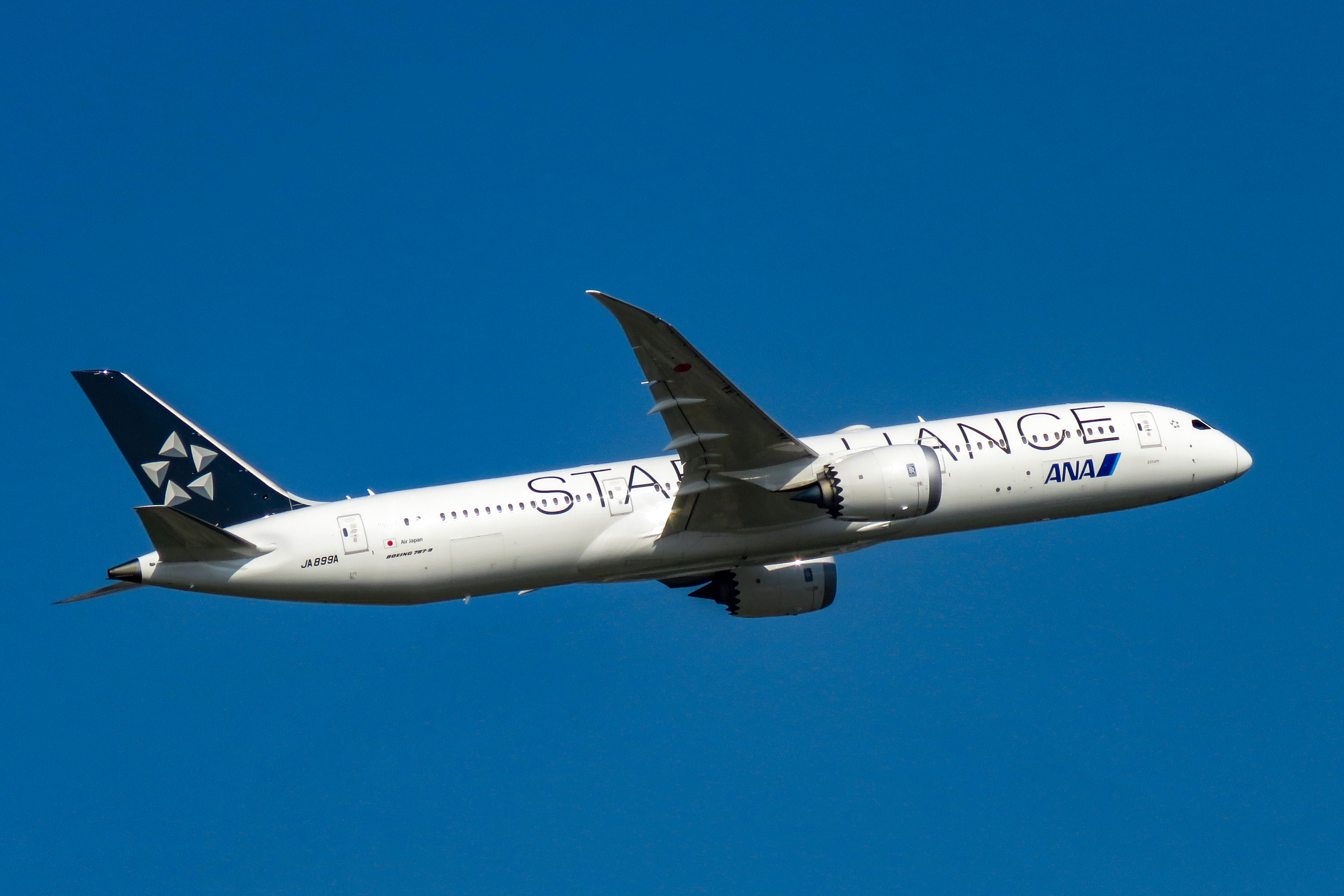
Boeing 787-9 in Star Alliance livery

Boeing 777-300ER in Eevee Jet livery

== Services ==
=== New cabin ===
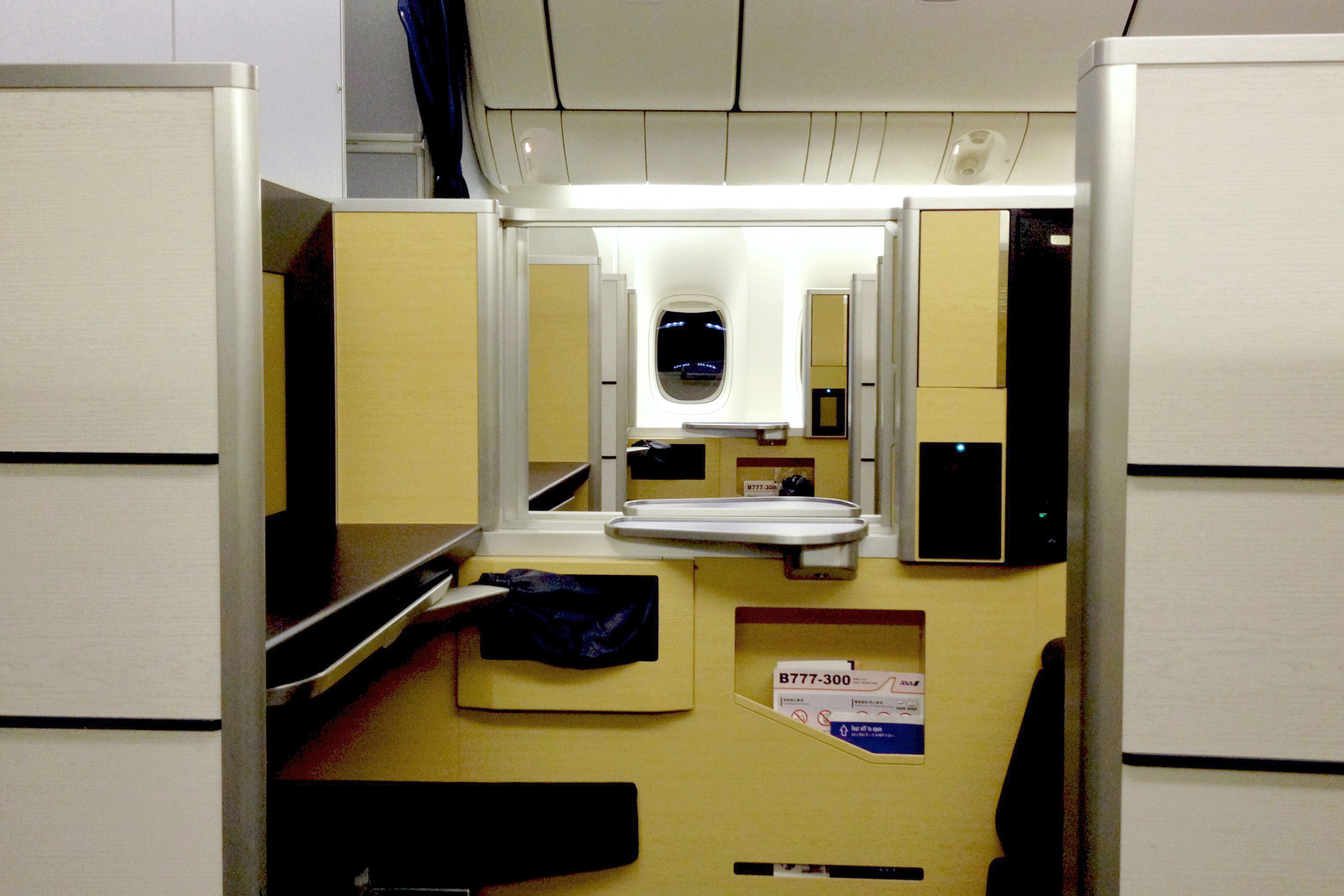
ANA "Inspiration of Japan" 777-300ER first class

Introduced in 2009, the "Inspiration of Japan" cabin features included fully-lie-flat-bed business class seats, nearly enclosed first class suite seats, fixed shell back seats in both of its economy classes, a new AVOD in-flight entertainment system (based on Panasonic Avionics Corporation's eX2 IFE system with iPod connectivity, in-seat shopping and meal ordering as well as cabin touchscreen consoles) as well as improvements to its in-flight service. ANA will introduced a new lounge (which opened on 20 February 2010, supposed to be in coincidence with the introduction of new aircraft interiors but delayed) and check-in concept (later in autumn 2010) at Narita for first class and ANA Mileage Club's Diamond Service elite members.

The introduction of the concept also discontinued the use of the name "Club ANA", which was used for its international business class seats (changing into a generic business class name) as well as the name of the lounges (all lounges for both first class and business class are named "ANA Lounge", with the first class lounge called the "ANA Suite Lounge" and its arrival lounge the "ANA Arrival Lounge").

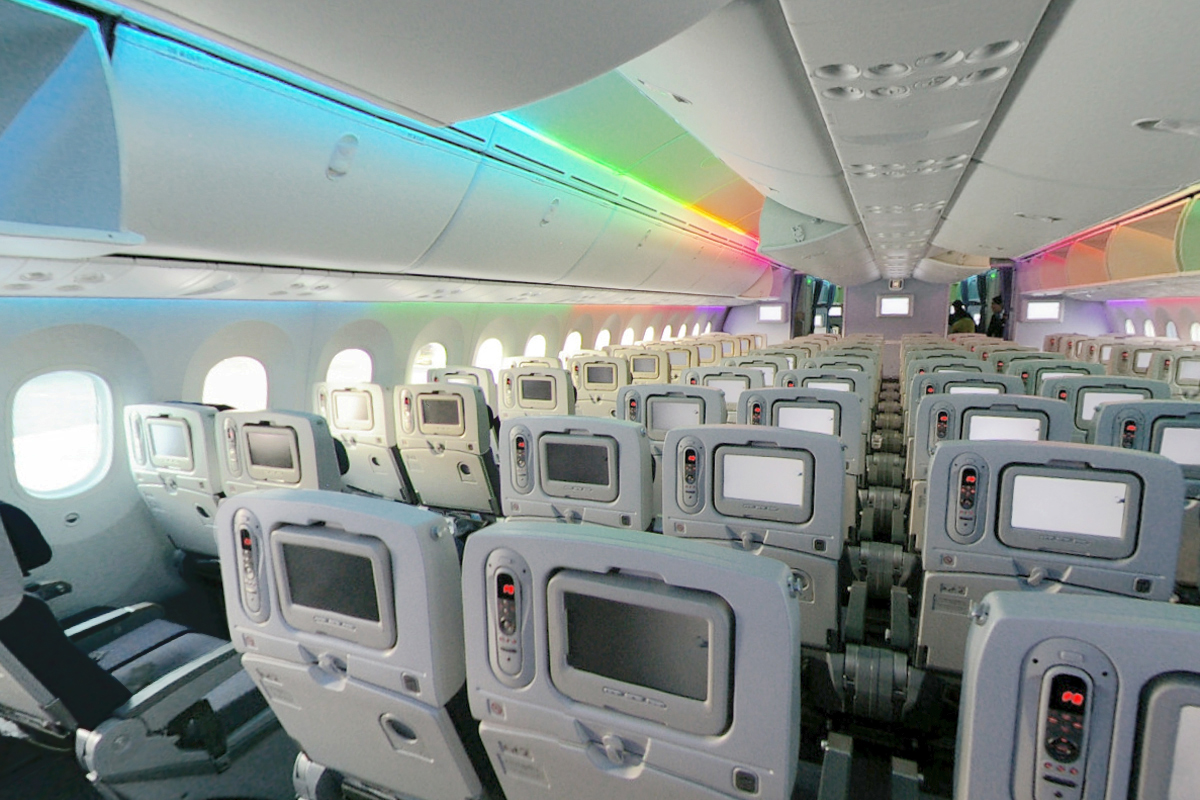
Old ANA "Inspiration of Japan" 787 Dreamliner economy class

This "Inspiration of Japan" concept was originally set to debut on 20 February 2010 with the delivery of its new Boeing 777-300ER prior to that date, followed by the introduction of the concept on that date on the Narita-New York route. However, due to delays to the new premium economy seats, the debut was pushed back to 19 April. (The delay was due to the failure of a safety test in Japan of a new seat design axle, made by seat manufacturer Koito Industries Ltd. This safety test failure also affected deliveries of aircraft to be operated by three other fellow Star Alliance members – Singapore Airlines for its A380s, Thai Airways' A330s, and Continental Airlines for new 737-800 deliveries.)

The "Inspiration of Japan" concept has been refitted on its existing 777-300ERs for service on all the airline's North American routes, and may be refitted on its European routes. Parts of it may eventually be phased into its existing Boeing 767-300ERs in service as well as the upcoming Boeing 787s in order.

Since February 2010, ANA offers women's-only lavatories on international flights. The first Boeing 787 the airline received have the bidets in both economy and business class lavatory.

=== Inflight magazine ===
ANA's inflight magazine is named Wingspan and is available both on board and as a freely downloadable application for Apple's iPad. The iPad version is named Virtual Airport and includes content from Wingspan as well as links to airline booking and online check-in pages.

=== Bus shuttle services ===
Previously, ANA had a dedicated shuttle bus from Düsseldorf to Frankfurt Airport so passengers may board ANA flights at that airport, but the bus service was discontinued after ANA began its dedicated Düsseldorf flights in 2014.

== Advertising and promotional activities ==
=== Sports ===
ANA sponsors and partners with sports organizations, teams, and athletes in Japan and overseas.

- Los Angeles Dodgers — official Japanese airline partner (2024–present). ANA entered a multi-year partnership with the Dodgers in 2024.
- Ski Association of Japan
- Japan Ice Hockey Federation
- Japan Football Association — major partner (2023–2026).
- Japan Aquatics
- Japan Skating Federation
- Japan Table Tennis Association
- Japan Table Tennis Federation for Players with an Intellectual Disability
- Badminton Association of Japan
- Japan Volleyball Association

The ANA Group currently lists these organizations and the Los Angeles Dodgers among its sports sponsorships.

=== Sponsored athletes ===
The ANA Group currently lists the following athletes among its sports sponsorships:

- Akie Iwai — professional golfer.
- Chisato Iwai — professional golfer.
- Takuma Sato — racing driver.
- Yuto Horigome — skateboarder.
- Kaoru Mitoma — footballer.

=== Former sponsored athletes ===
- Yuzuru Hanyu — figure skater (2013–2023). ANA signed an affiliation agreement with Hanyu in July 2013 and supported him as an affiliated athlete.
- Shingo Kunieda — wheelchair tennis player; formerly sponsored by ANA. ANA announced a sponsorship agreement with Kunieda in December 2015, with the sponsorship beginning in 2016.
- Sara Takanashi — ski jumper; formerly sponsored by ANA. ANA announced a sponsorship agreement with Takanashi in November 2014.

=== Cultural and community activities ===
- National Cherry Blossom Festival — ANA supported the festival as part of its community activities in Washington, D.C.

== In popular culture ==
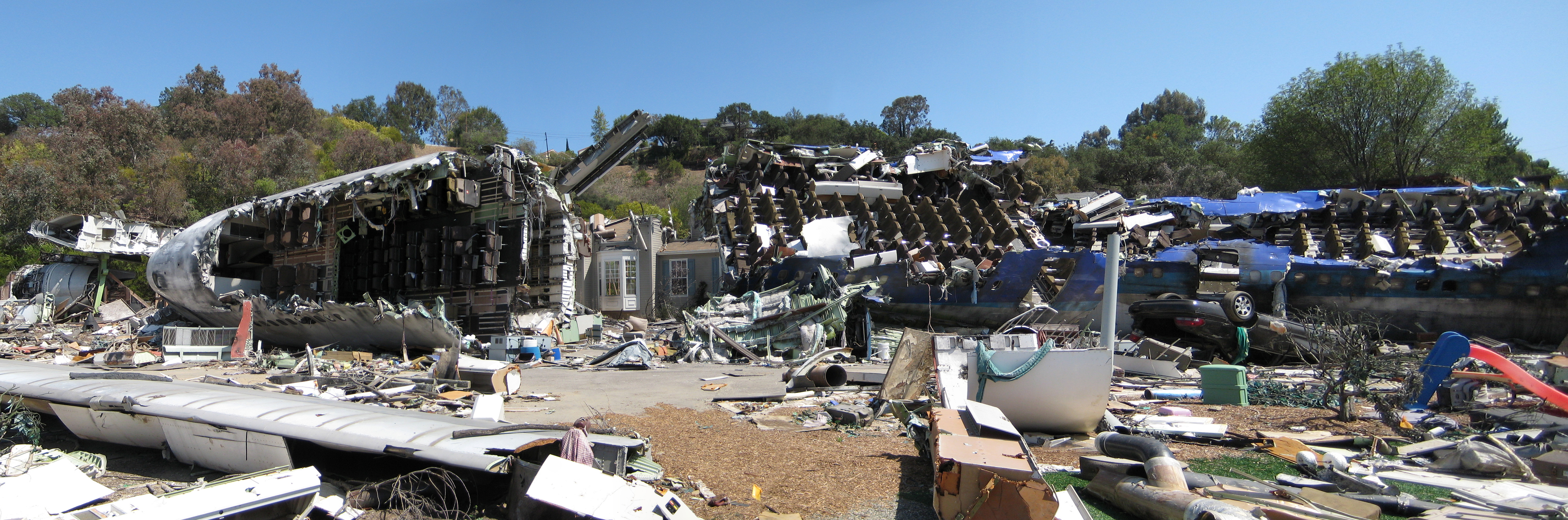
Former ANA Boeing 747-SR destroyed after withdrawal used in the film set of 2005 film War Of The Worlds. Note the airline's blue paint still applied on the aircraft with all their logos removed.

- ANA sponsored the film Happy Flight, which is about a co-pilot and flight attendant on an ANA flight to Hawaii.
- ANA was featured in Miss Pilot, a Japanese television drama about a female pilot.
- ANA sponsored the Japanese television drama Good Luck!!, which is about a group of airline crew members. The series starred Takuya Kimura, Shinichi Tsutsumi and Kou Shibasaki.
- The title for All Nippon Air Line, a Josei manga by Kei Azumaya, was inspired by All Nippon Airways.
- Some of ANA's aircraft were Pokémon-themed. Special exclusive promotional trading cards were also given out to passengers during certain Pokémon marketing campaigns. As of 2016, most of ANA's Pokémon-themed jets have been either retired or repainted. In 2023, ANA reintroduced the Pokémon-themed jets with a Boeing 787-9 (JA894A) and a Boeing 777-300ER (JA784A) after seven years.
- The fictional airline All Korea Airlines featured in the SBS drama Vagabond, sports similarities to ANA in regards to its name and logo.
- The airplane crash set built for War Of The Worlds, now featured in Universal Studios Hollywood's studio tour, was one of ANA's retired Boeing 747-100SR registered as JA8147. It was dismantled into several pieces for the film and still bears the ANA livery with its titles removed.
- The arcade game Landing High Japan by Taito features product placement by ANA.

== Award and recognition ==
On 24 June 2024, ANA was voted 2024 Best Airport Services in the World and Best Airline Staff Service in Asia by Skytrax. The airline also scooped the runners-up awards for Best Cabin Staff in the World and Cleanest Airline in the World during the same ceremony.

== Accidents and incidents ==
- On 12 August 1958, Flight 025, a Douglas DC-3 (JA5045), crashed 17 km (11 mi) off Toshima, one hour after takeoff from Tokyo en route to Nagoya, killing all 33 on board.
- In 1958, dynamite was planted in a Douglas DC-3 by Akira Emoto, a candy salesman, as part of a suicide plan. Emoto killed himself by leaping from the aircraft and the bombs failed to detonate.
- On 16 March 1960, Douglas DC-3 JA5018 was taxiing after landing at Nagoya-Komaki International Airport when North American F-86D Sabre 94-8137 of the Japan Air Self-Defense Force (JASDF) collided with its aft fuselage and tail section while attempting to take off, killing 3 of 33 on board. Although the Sabre crashed and burned, the pilot survived.
- On 12 June 1961, Vickers Viscount G-APKJ was written off when the starboard undercarriage collapsed following a heavy landing at Osaka Itami Airport.
- On 19 November 1962, Vickers Viscount JA8202 crashed at Nagoya while on a training flight due to possible pilot error, killing all four crew on board.
- On 30 April 1963, Douglas DC-3 JA5039 crashed at Hachijojima Airport due to locked up brakes; both pilots survived, but the aircraft was damaged beyond repair.
- On 10 May 1963, DC-3 JA5040 crashed at Sendai.
- On 5 June 1963, DC-3 JA5027 swerved off the runway on takeoff at Osaka-Itami Airport and struck the rear of a second DC-3 (JA5078); JA5078 was written off while JA5027 was repaired with parts from DC-3 JA5039.
- On 14 February 1965, DC-3 JA5080 struck Mount Nakanoone at 2,200 m (7,200 ft), killing both pilots; the wreckage was located on 29 December 1966.
- On 4 February 1966, Flight 60, operated by Boeing 727 JA8302, was on approach to Tokyo Haneda Airport when it crashed into Tokyo Bay for reasons unknown, killing all 133 passengers and crew. Following this accident, all passenger aircraft operating in Japan were required to be equipped with cockpit voice recorders and flight data recorders.
- On 13 November 1966, Flight 533 operated by a NAMC YS-11, crashed in the Seto Inland Sea off Matsuyama following an unexplained loss of altitude while attempting to go-around, killing all 50 on board.

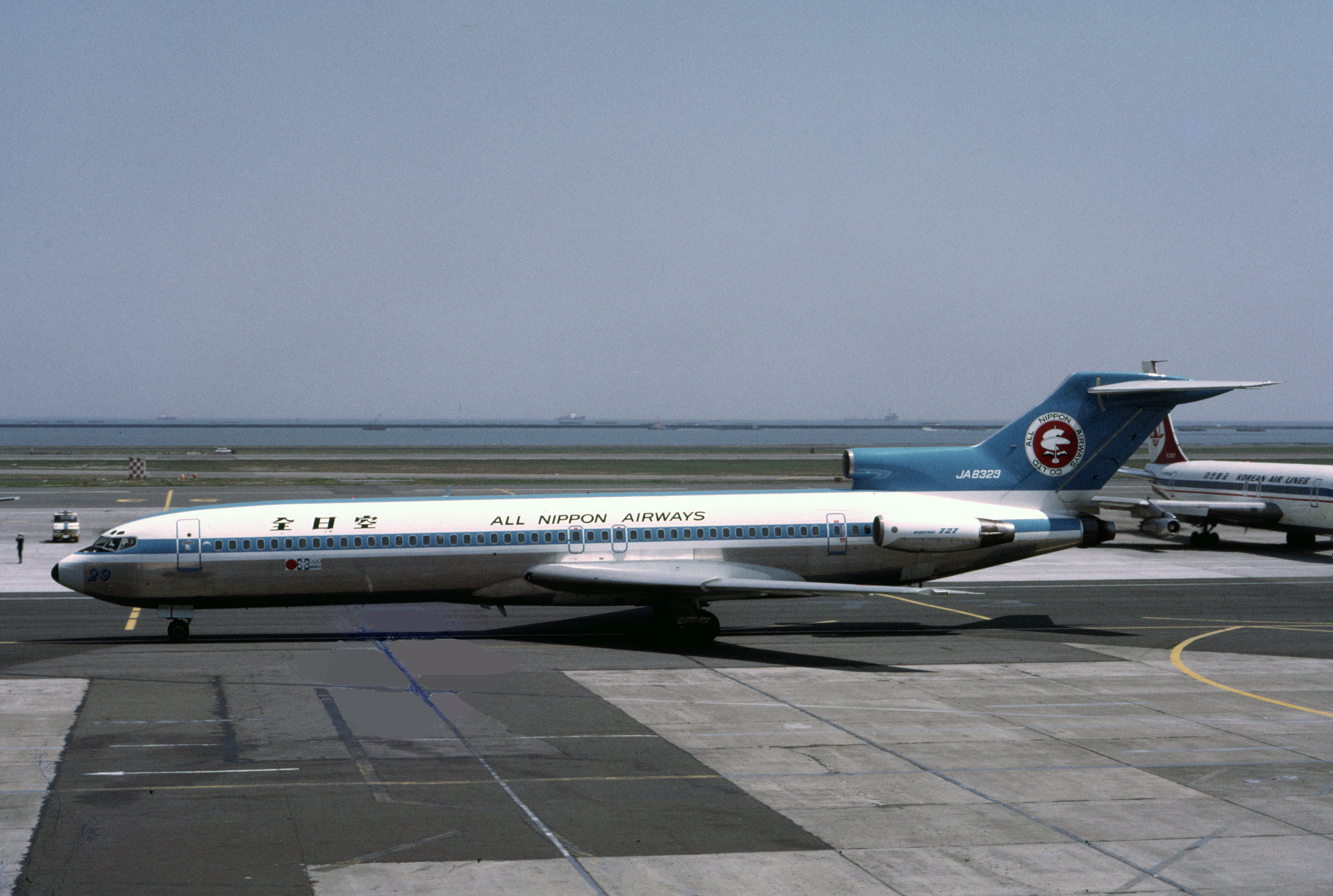
JA8329, the Boeing 727 involved in the collision in July 1971 taken two months before the collision

- On 30 July 1971, Flight 58, operated by a Boeing 727-200 (JA8329), collided with JASDF F-86F Sabre 92-7932 that was on a training flight; the right wing of the F-86 struck the left horizontal stabilizer of the 727 and both aircraft crashed out of control, killing all 162 on board the 727; the F-86 pilot ejected and survived.
- On 22 June 1995 a man calling himself "Fumio Kujimi" and registered with ANA as "Saburo Kobayashi" hijacked Flight 857, a Boeing 747SR, after it took off from Tokyo. The aircraft landed in Hokkaidō where it was stormed by police, arresting the hijacker. Police stated that the hijacker was 53-year-old Fujio Kutsumi; he had demanded the release of Shoko Asahara. The hijacking incident lasted 16 hours.
- On 23 July 1999, a man hijacked Flight 61 and killed the captain. He was subdued by other crew members, and no passengers or other crew were killed or injured.

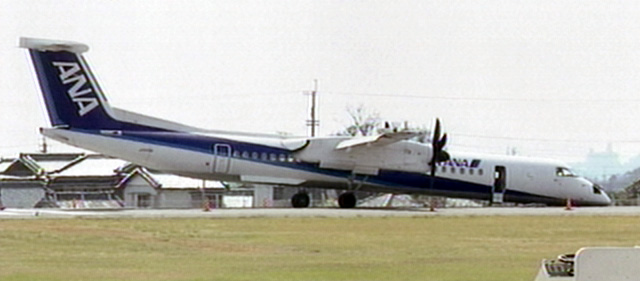
Flight 1603 after landing

- On 13 March 2007, ANA flight 1603 departed Itami Airport to Kochi Airport, where the Bombardier DHC-8-402 landed without its nose landing gear, causing damage to the nose. None of the 60 passengers and crew on board were injured. The failure for the landing gear to extend was determined to be from the landing gear doors not opening due to missing parts.
- On 6 September 2011, Flight 140, operated by a 737-700 traveling from Naha to Tokyo with 117 passengers and crew, banked over 90 degrees in mid-air and rapidly descended as the first officer inadvertently rotated the rudder trim switch instead of the door unlock button as the captain returned from the lavatory. The first officer eventually regained control and leveled the aircraft. There were minor injuries to two flight attendants.
- On 16 January 2013, Flight 692, a Boeing 787-8 flying from Yamaguchi Ube Airport to Tokyo Haneda Airport reported a battery problem while climbing to FL330. The pilots made an emergency landing at Takamatsu Airport. Four minor injuries were reported during the evacuation via the emergency slides. However, after this incident, all 787s were subsequently grounded by aviation authorities until the battery issue was resolved.
- On 13 January 2024, Flight 1182, a Boeing 737-800 traveling from Sapporo to Toyama reported a crack in the cockpit window while passing over the city of Hakodate in Hokkaido. It landed back at Sapporo's New Chitose Airport at 12:10 local time (03:10 GMT) with no fatalities or injuries.
- On 24 May 2025, Flight 114, operated by a Boeing 787-9, a passenger tried to open the emergency door while the plane was traveling from Tokyo to Houston. Passengers and crew members restrained the passenger, and the plane made an emergency landing at Seattle–Tacoma International Airport at 4:19am local time.

== See also ==
- Aviation
- Air transport in Japan
- List of airports in Japan
- List of Japanese companies
- Transport in Japan
- Yokohama Flügels
- Oriental Land Company
