= Air Nippon Network =

Regional airline of Japan (2001–2010)

Air Nippon Network Co., Ltd. 株式会社エアーニッポンネットワーク Kabushiki-gaisha Eā Nippon Nettowāku
IATA	ICAO	Call sign
EH	AKX	ALFA WING
- Founded: May 2001
- Commenced operations: July 1, 2002
- Ceased operations: October 1, 2010 (merged with Air Next and Air Central to form ANA Wings)
- Hubs: New Chitose Airport
- Alliance: Star Alliance (affiliate; 2001–2010)
- Fleet size: 19 aircraft
- Destinations: See Destinations below
- Parent company: Air Nippon
- Headquarters: Haneda Airport, Ōta, Tokyo; Higashi-ku, Sapporo, Hokkaido

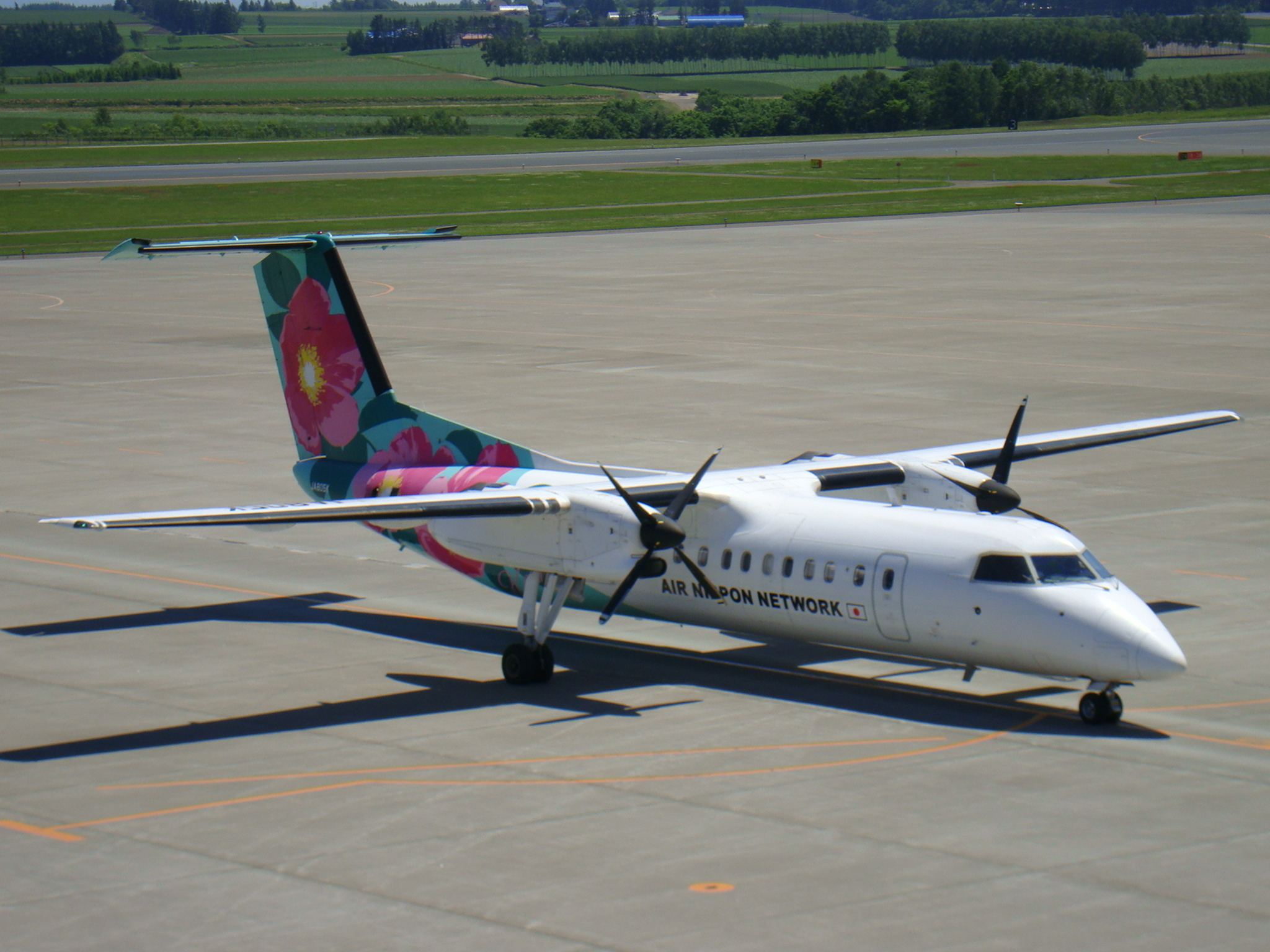
De Havilland Canada Dash 8-300

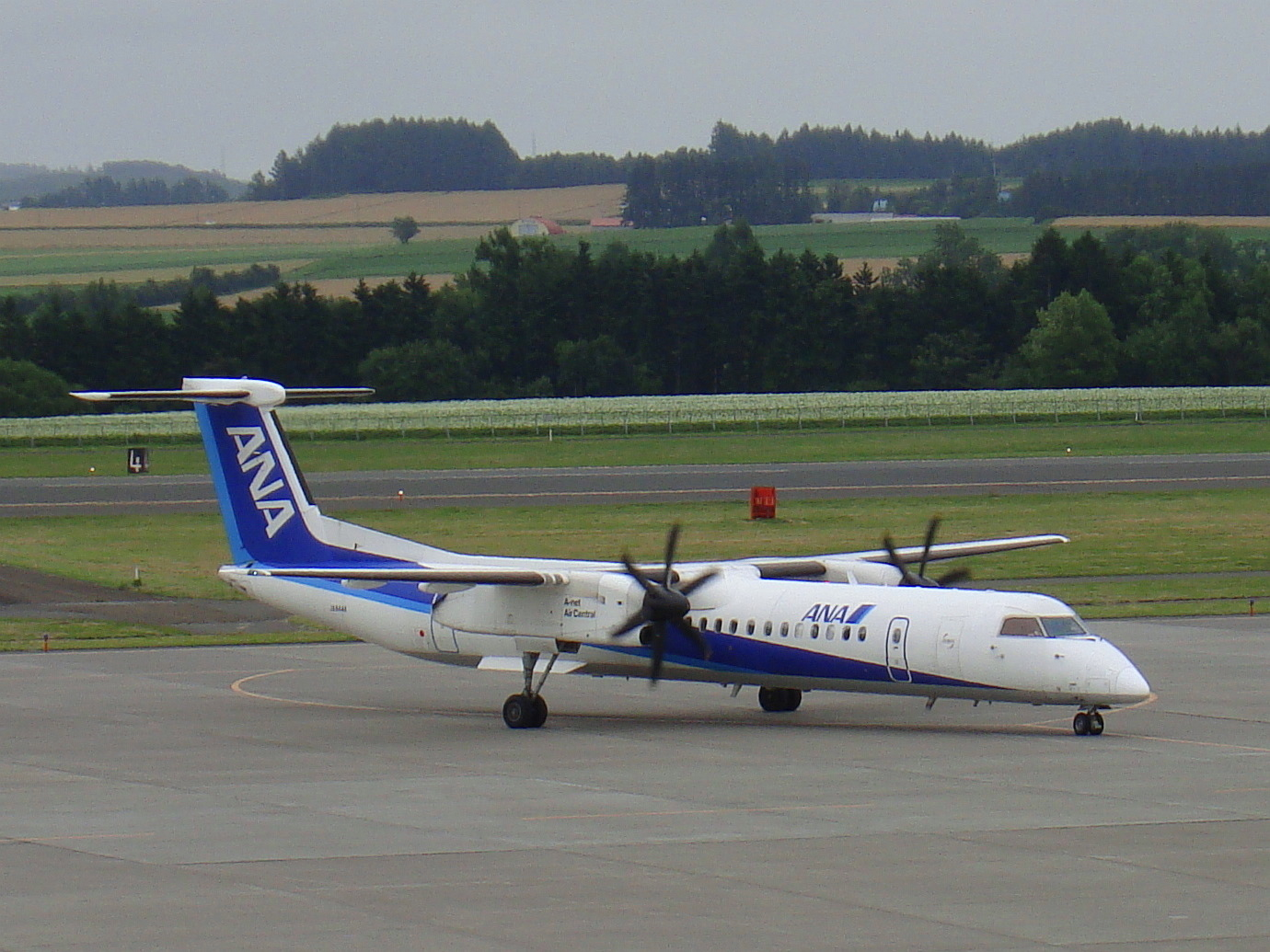
De Havilland Canada Dash 8-400

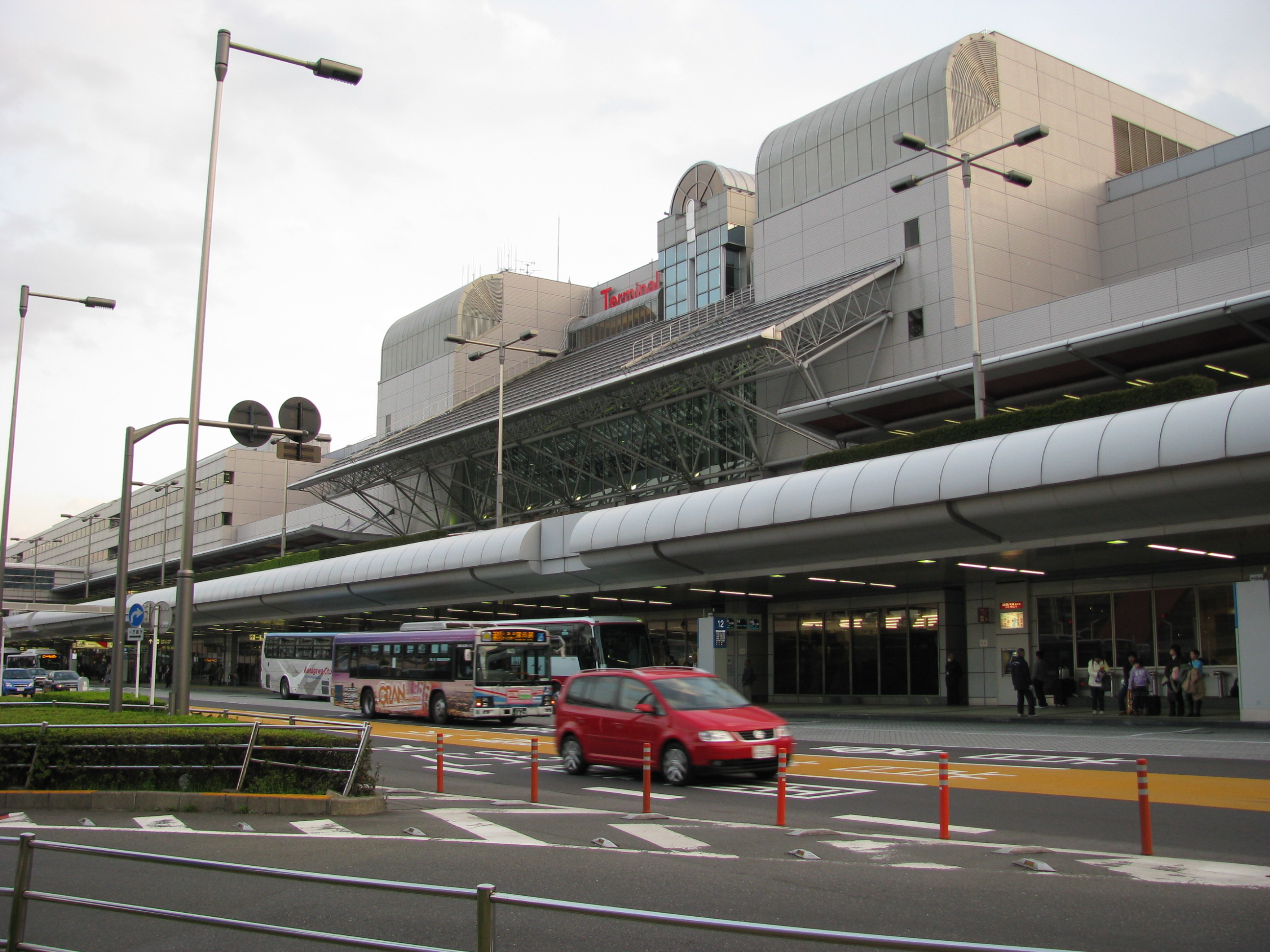
Terminal 1 of Haneda Airport, which included the Air Nippon Network headquarters

Air Nippon Network (or A-net) was an airline based on the grounds of Haneda Airport in Ōta, Tokyo, Japan.

It operated feeder services for parent Air Nippon, itself a subsidiary of All Nippon Airways (ANA). Its main base was New Chitose Airport. On October 1, 2010, Air Nippon Network, Air Next and Air Central were merged and rebranded as ANA Wings.

== History ==
The airline was established in May 2001 to operate Air Nippon's local feeder routes from Tokyo and Sapporo. It started operations on 1 July 2002 using three Bombardier Dash 8 aircraft. In December 2003 4 more Dash 8s joined to replace Boeing 737 aircraft operated from Osaka by Air Nippon.

In April 2004 Air Nippon Network was headquartered in Higashi-ku, Sapporo, Hokkaido.

Air Nippon Network had 400 employees (at March 2007).

== Destinations ==
Domestic destinations included:

=== Hokkaidō ===
- Hakodate (Hakodate Airport)
- Kushiro (Kushiro Airport)
- Memanbetsu (Memanbetsu Airport)
- Nakashibetsu (Nakashibetsu Airport)
- Sapporo (New Chitose Airport)
- Wakkanai (Wakkanai Airport)

=== Kantō ===
- Tokyo (Haneda Airport)
- Miyakejima (Miyakejima Airport)
- Ōshima (Oshima Airport)

=== Kansai ===
- Hyōgo Prefecture
  - Itami Airport is partly in Hyōgo Prefecture and partly in Osaka Prefecture
- Osaka Prefecture
  - Osaka
    - Itami Airport is partly in Hyōgo Prefecture and partly in Osaka Prefecture
    - Kansai International Airport

=== Tōhoku ===
- Akita Prefecture
  - Ōdate-Noshiro (Odate-Noshiro Airport)

=== Chūbu ===
- Niigata Prefecture
  - Niigata (Niigata Airport)

=== Chūgoku ===
- Shimane Prefecture
  - Iwami/Hagi, Yamaguchi Prefecture (Iwami Airport)

=== Shikoku ===
- Ehime Prefecture
  - Matsuyama (Matsuyama Airport)
- Kōchi Prefecture
  - Kōchi (Kōchi Ryōma Airport)

=== Kyūshū ===
- Fukuoka Prefecture
  - Fukuoka (Fukuoka Airport)
- Saga Prefecture
  - Saga (Saga Airport)

=== Okinawa ===
- Naha Airport

International destinations included

== Fleet ==
The Air Nippon Network fleet consisted of the following aircraft (as of June 2008):

- 5 De Havilland Canada Dash 8-300
- 14 De Havilland Canada Dash 8-400
