= Air Central =

Air Central may refer to:

- Air Central (China), a Chinese cargo airline
- Air Central (Japan), a Japanese passenger airline 1988–2010
