= Kochi Airport =

Kochi Airport may refer to:

- Cochin International Airport, India
- Kōchi Airport, Japan
