= Air Central (Japan) =

Regional airline of Japan (1988–2010)

Air Central Co., Ltd. エアーセントラル株式会社 Eā Sentoraru Kabushiki-gaisha
IATA	ICAO	Call sign
NV	CRF	AIR CENTRAL
- Founded: May 12, 1988 (as Nakanihon Airlines); February 17, 2005 (as Air Central)
- Ceased operations: February 17, 2005 (as Nakanihon Airlines); October 1, 2010 (merged with Air Next and Air Nippon Network to form ANA Wings)
- Hubs: Chubu Centrair International Airport
- Alliance: Star Alliance (affiliate; 1999–2010)
- Destinations: 12
- Parent company: All Nippon Airways (86.7%); Nagoya Railroad (13.3%)
- Headquarters: Tokoname, Aichi Prefecture
- Website: www.air-central.co.jp

Air Central was an airline based in Tokoname, Aichi Prefecture, Japan. It operated passenger services as All Nippon Airways (ANA) flights from its main base is Chūbu Centrair International Airport near Nagoya. On October 1, 2010, Air Central, Air Next and Air Nippon Network were merged and rebranded as ANA Wings.

== History ==
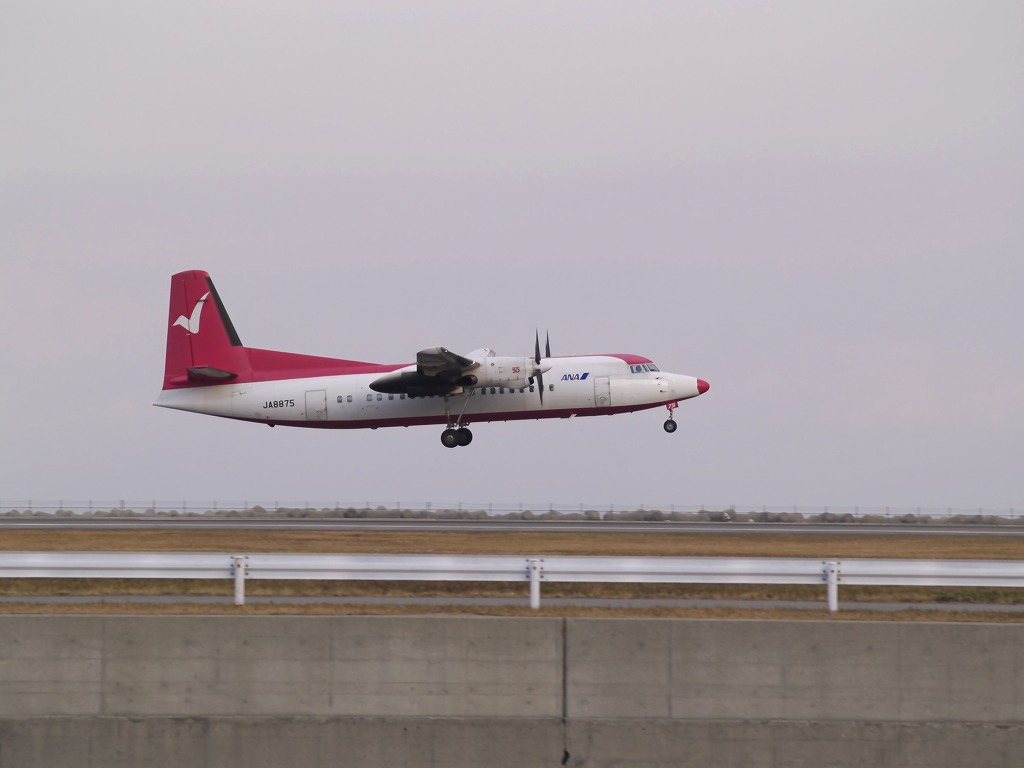
An Air Central Fokker 50 in the former livery departing Oita Airport, Japan in 2005.

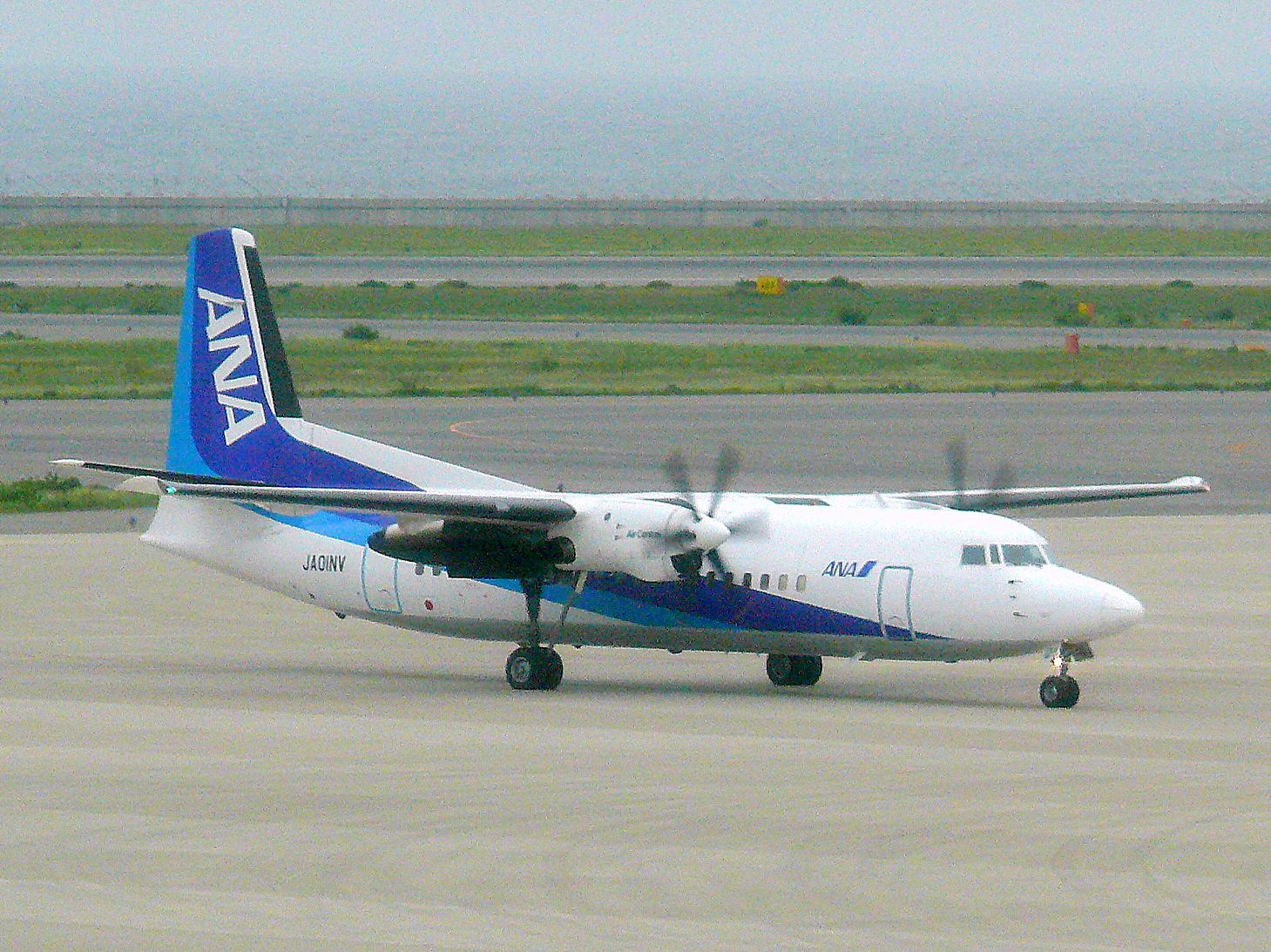
An Air Central Fokker 50 in the All Nippon Airways livery at Chubu Centrair International Airport, Japan in 2008.

In 1953, Nakanihon Air Service (NAS) was founded near Nagoya Airport (now Nagoya Airfield). Its major shareholders included Nagoya Railroad and ANA. Its core business was general aviation, including scenic and charter flights, aerial photography and helicopter services. It still operates as a general aviation company.

Nakanihon Airlines was founded on May 12, 1988. It was headquartered in Nagoya Airport and was a joint venture between Nagoya Railroad and ANA. Commuter services began operations on 23 April 1991.

On February 17, 2005, NAL was renamed to the current name and was relocated to Chubu Centrair International Airport. The flight schedules were amended for convenience of domestic and international flight changeover there. These moves were made for ANA's wish to feed international flights from Centrair operated by ANA and its Star Alliance partners.

== Destinations ==
As of April 2007, Air Central served the following destinations on the Japanese islands of Honshū, Shikoku and Kyūshū.

Between Nagoya-Centrair and:

- Fukuoka Airport (FUK), Fukuoka, Fukuoka
- Fukushima Airport (FKS), Tamakawa, Fukushima near Koriyama
- Matsuyama Airport (MYJ), Matsuyama, Ehime
- Narita International Airport (NRT), Chiba Prefecture, 70 kilometres from Tokyo
- Niigata Airport (KIJ), Niigata, Niigata
- Tokushima Airport (TKS), Matsushige, Tokushima near

Tokushima city

- Yonago Airport (Miho Airbase YGJ), Sakaiminato, Tottori near Yonago

Between Itami Airport (ITM) Itami, Ōsaka and:

- Kochi Airport (KCZ), Nankoku, Kōchi
- Matsuyama Airport
- Niigata Airport

Between Fukuoka Airport and:

- Goto-Fukue Airport (FUJ), Gotō, Nagasaki
- Tsushima Airport (TSJ), Tsushima, Nagasaki

It also operated the Sendai Airport (SDJ), near Sendai, Miyagi to Narita International Airport (NRT) route.

== Fleet ==
The Air Central fleet included (as of March 2007):

- 3 Fokker 50 (All have been repainted in the livery of ANA prior to retirement)
- 2 De Havilland Canada Dash 8-400 (progressively leased and carrying the livery of ANA which is later transferred to ANA Wings)
