= Lufthansa Italia =

Italian airline and a wholly owned subsidiary of the German Lufthansa Group

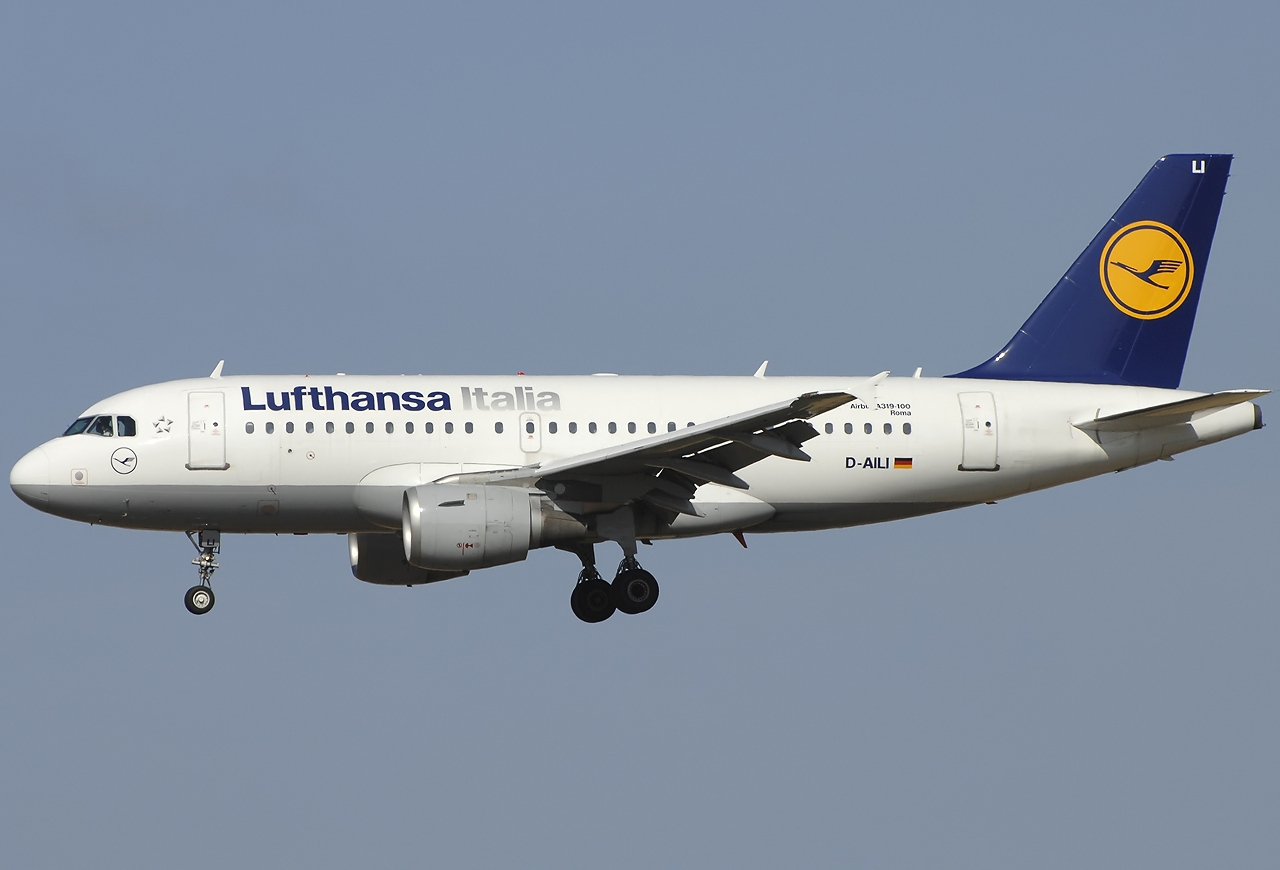
- Airbus A319-100
IATA	ICAO	Call sign
LH	LIT	MIRACOLO
- Founded: 2008
- Commenced operations: 2 February 2009
- Ceased operations: 29 October 2011
- Operating bases: Milan–Malpensa
- Frequent-flyer program: Miles & More
- Alliance: Star Alliance (affiliate)
- Fleet size: 9
- Destinations: 18
- Parent company: Lufthansa
- Headquarters: Milan, Italy
- Key people: Michael Kraus, CEO
- Website: italia.lufthansa.com at the Wayback Machine (archive index)

Lufthansa Italia S.p.A. was an Italian airline, wholly owned subsidiary of the German Lufthansa Group, headquartered in Milan and based at Milan–Malpensa Airport. Operations started on 2 February 2009 and ceased on 29 October 2011.

== History ==
=== Foundation ===
On 28 April 2008 Lufthansa announced plans to launch intra-European flights out of Milan–Malpensa Airport using six Embraer 195 aircraft made available by its subsidiary Air Dolomiti. Instead of the originally planned Air Dolomiti operations the new brand Lufthansa Italia was announced on 26 November 2008. The subsidiary was established to allow Lufthansa to better tap into the lucrative North Italian market that was all but abandoned by Alitalia during a series of cutbacks. Operations started on 2 February 2009 to exclusively international destinations using Airbus A319-100. The airline's on board cuisine was aimed towards the Italian market, with Italian foods and drinks. For example, in business class, Italian espresso coffee was served. On March 4th, the opening of the first three domestic routes to Rome, Naples and Bari was announced.

=== Mixed results ===
On February 16, 2010, the airline discontinued the route to Rome-Fiumicino due to passenger numbers not meeting expectations. To compensate for the closure of the routes to Brussels and Rome, three new destinations became operational on March 28, while three seasonal routes were inaugurated the following summer. On July 21, Lufthansa Italia announced two new destinations: Catania and Prague, which would be opened coinciding with the 2010/2011 winter season. However, on September 3, Catania was removed, and Bucharest became a seasonal destination. Instead, the route to Naples (initially scheduled twice daily) was increased to three daily frequencies.

=== Shutdown ===
On 23 July 2011, German Lufthansa issued a press release announcing that it would stop all Lufthansa Italia operations by 29 October 2011 as it had been proven too difficult to run the Italian-based operations economically. As a replacement, the Lufthansa Group increased their flights from Italian destinations to their German hubs of Frankfurt and Munich instead. The last scheduled flight of Lufthansa Italia, from Palermo to Milan-Malpensa, occurred on 29 October 2011. The former Lufthansa Italia aircraft were transferred to other Lufthansa Group airlines.

== Destinations ==
The following cities were served by Lufthansa Italia prior to its shutdown:

Hub
Seasonal

City	Country	IATA	ICAO	Airport
Barcelona	Spain	BCN	LEBL	Josep Tarradellas Barcelona–El Prat Airport
Bari	Italy	BRI	LIBD	Bari Airport
Cagliari	Italy	CAG	LIEE	Cagliari Airport
Casablanca	Morocco	CAS	GMMC	Casablanca Anfa Airport
Catania	Italy	CTA	LICC	Catania Airport
Ibiza	Spain	IBZ	LEIB	Ibiza Airport
Lisbon	Portugal	LIS	LPPT	Lisbon Airport
London	United Kingdom	LHR	EGLL	Heathrow Airport
Madrid	Spain	MAD	LEMD	Adolfo Suárez Madrid–Barajas Airport
Milan	Italy	MXP	LIMC	Milan Malpensa Airport
Naples	Italy	NAP	LIRN	Naples Airport
Olbia	Italy	OLB	LIEO	Olbia Airport
Palermo	Italy	PMO	LICJ	Palermo Airport
Palma de Mallorca	Spain	PMI	LEPA	Palma de Mallorca Airport
Paris	France	CDG	LFPG	Charles de Gaulle Airport
Prague	Czech Republic	PRG	LKPR	Václav Havel Airport Prague
Rome	Italy	FCO	LIRF	Rome Fiumicino Airport
Stockholm	Sweden	ARN	ESSA	Stockholm Arlanda Airport
Warsaw	Poland	WAW	EPWA	Warsaw Chopin Airport

== Fleet ==
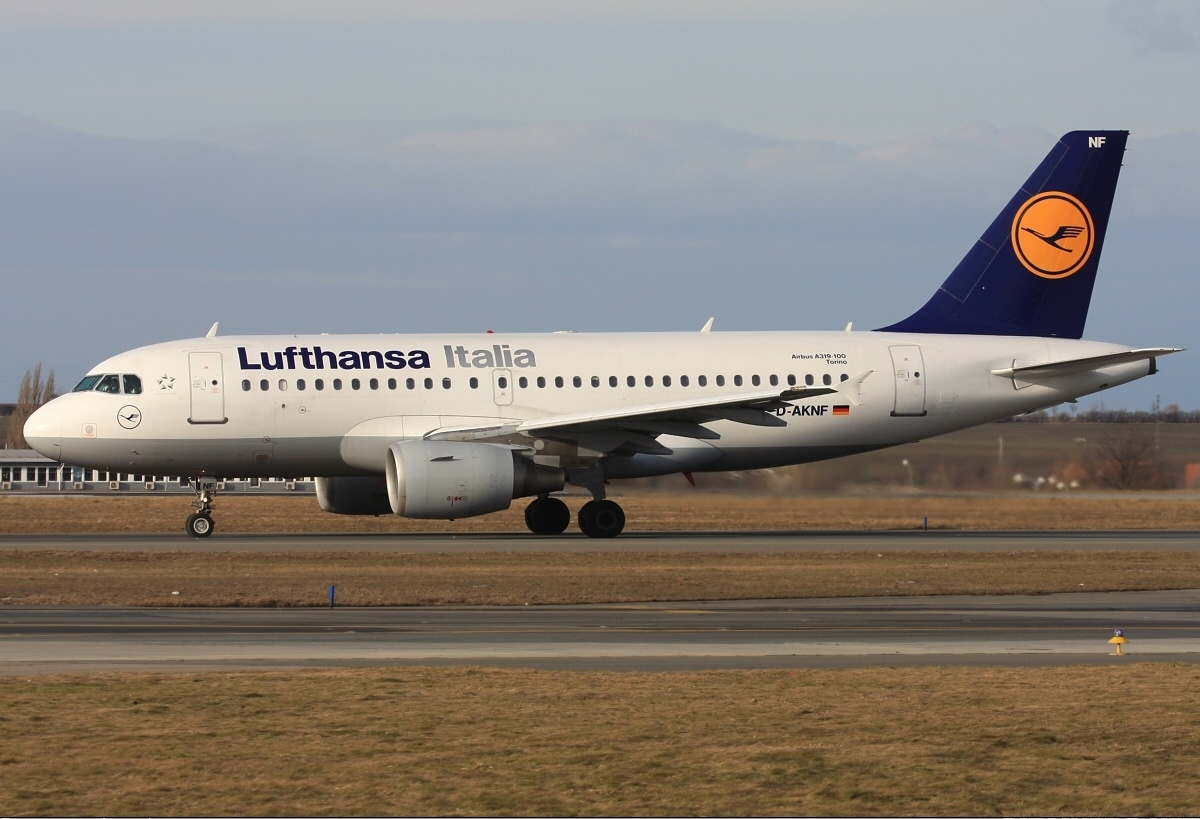
Airbus A319-100

All Lufthansa Italia aircraft were given names of Italian cities, such as "Bologna" and "Varese", and were painted in a slightly modified Lufthansa livery while retaining the German registrations.

Lufthansa Italia fleet
Aircraft	Total	Passengers			Notes
Aircraft	Total	J	Y	Total	Notes
Airbus A319-100	9	12	120	132	taken over from Germanwings and Lufthansa
Total	9				
