= ANA Wings =

Regional airline of Japan

ANA Wings Co., Ltd. ANAウイングス株式会社 ANA Uingusu Kabushiki-gaisha

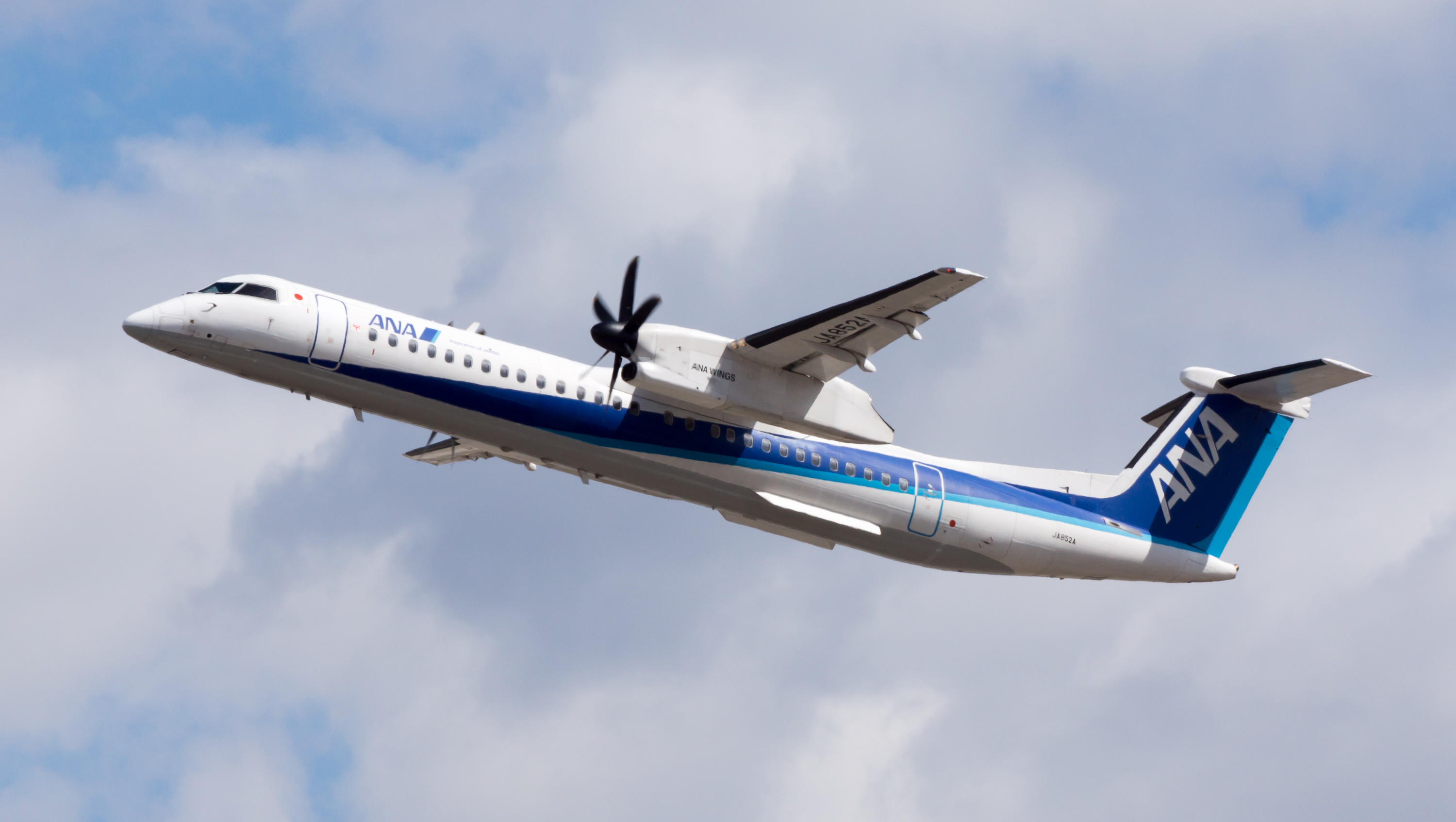
- ANA Wings DHC-8-400
IATA	ICAO	Call sign
NH; EH	ANA; AKX	ALL NIPPON; ALFA WING
- Commenced operations: 1 October 2010; 15 years ago (amalgamation)
- Hubs: Fukuoka; Nagoya–Centrair; Naha; Osaka–Itami; Sapporo–Chitose; Tokyo–Haneda
- Frequent-flyer program: ANA Mileage Club
- Alliance: Star Alliance (affiliate)
- Fleet size: 65
- Destinations: 48
- Parent company: All Nippon Airways
- Headquarters: Ōta, Tokyo, Japan
- Key people: Hiroki Izumi (CEO)
- Employees: 1,157 (1 April 2014)
- Website: www.anawings.co.jp

ANA Wings is a regional airline with its corporate headquarters at Ōta, Tokyo, Japan and a wholly owned subsidiary of All Nippon Airways (ANA). The airline was formed on 1 October 2010 through the merger of Air Next, Air Central and Air Nippon Network.

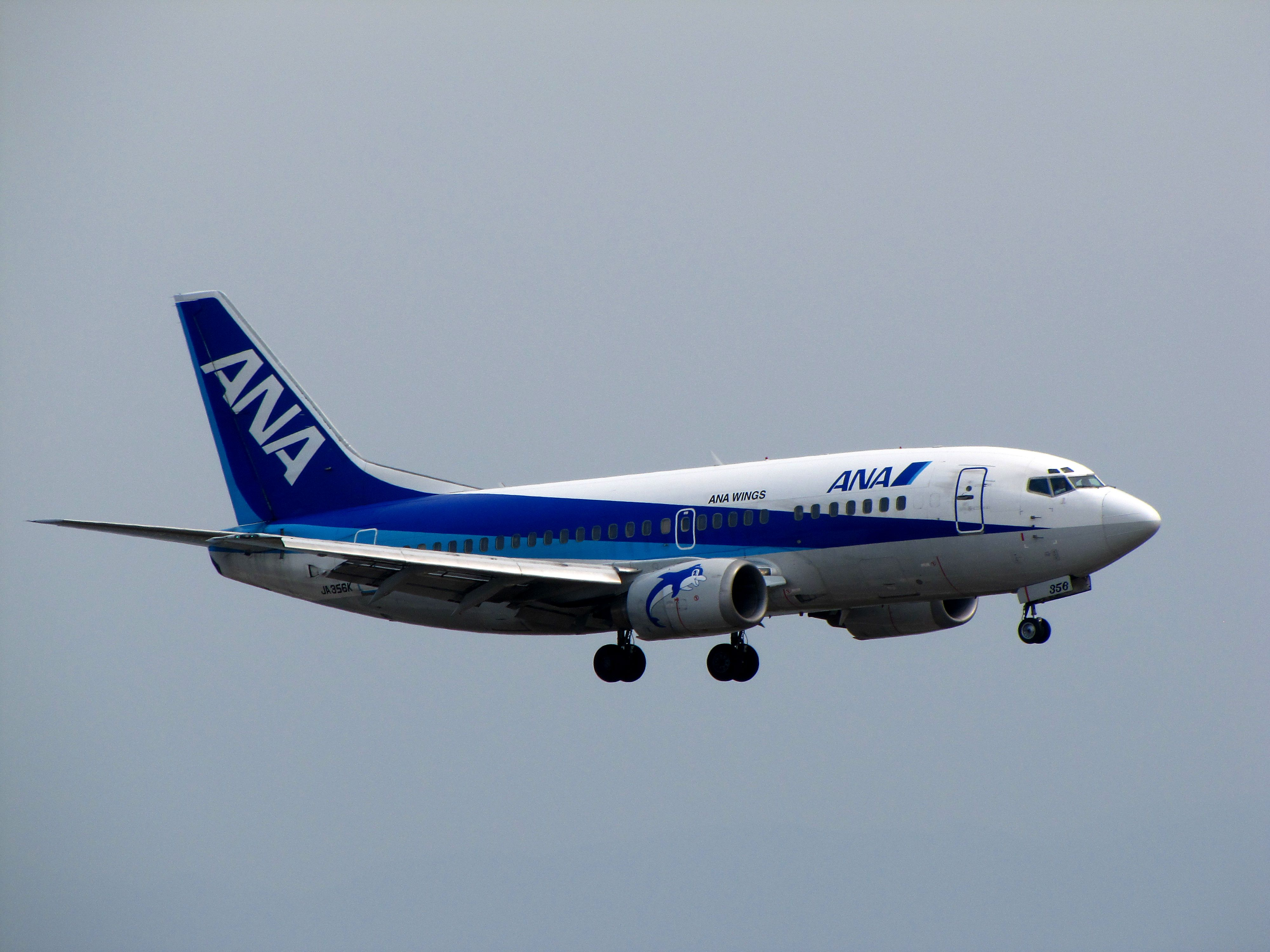
A former ANA Wings Boeing 737-500 in 2012.

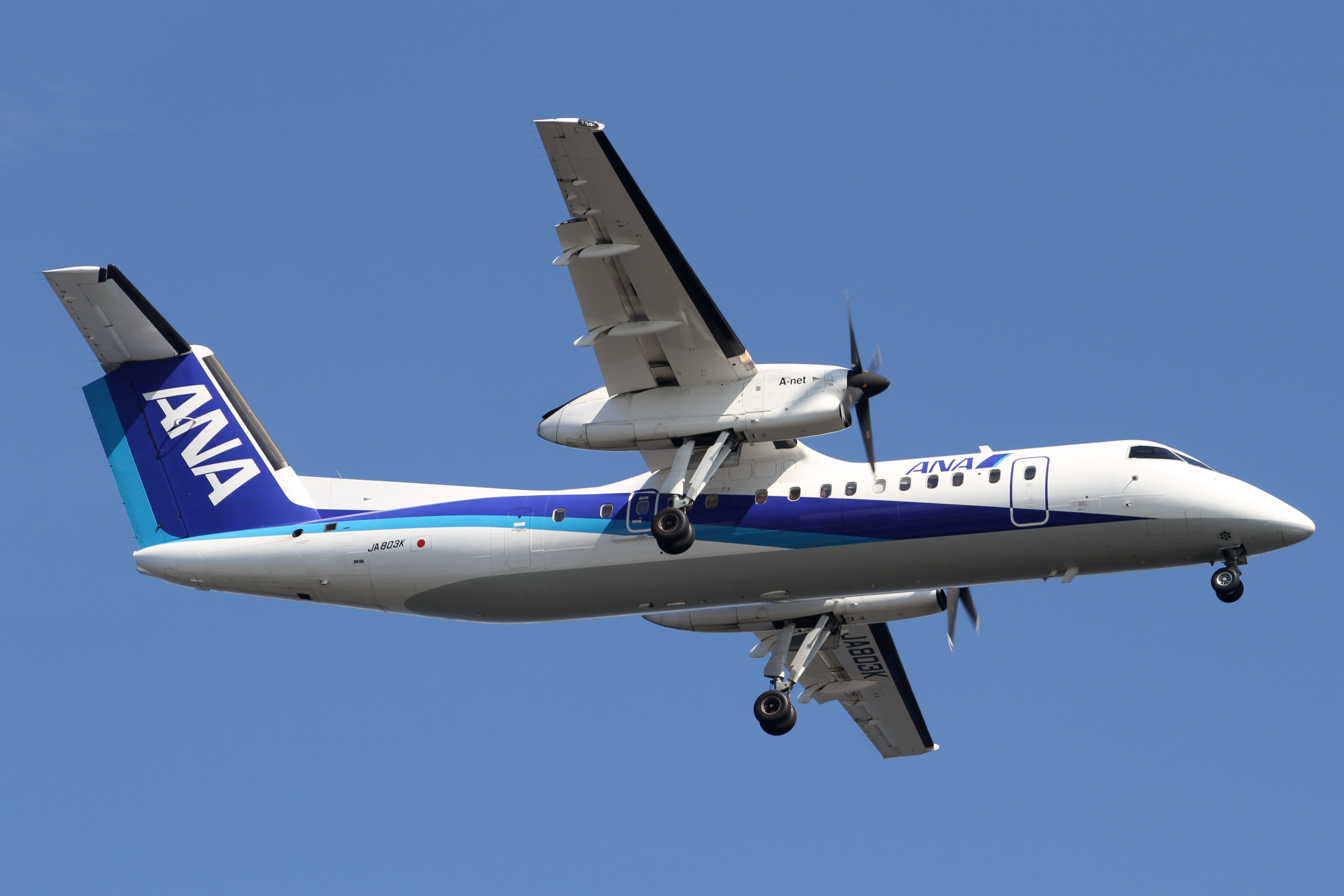
A former ANA Wings Bombardier Q300 in 2012.

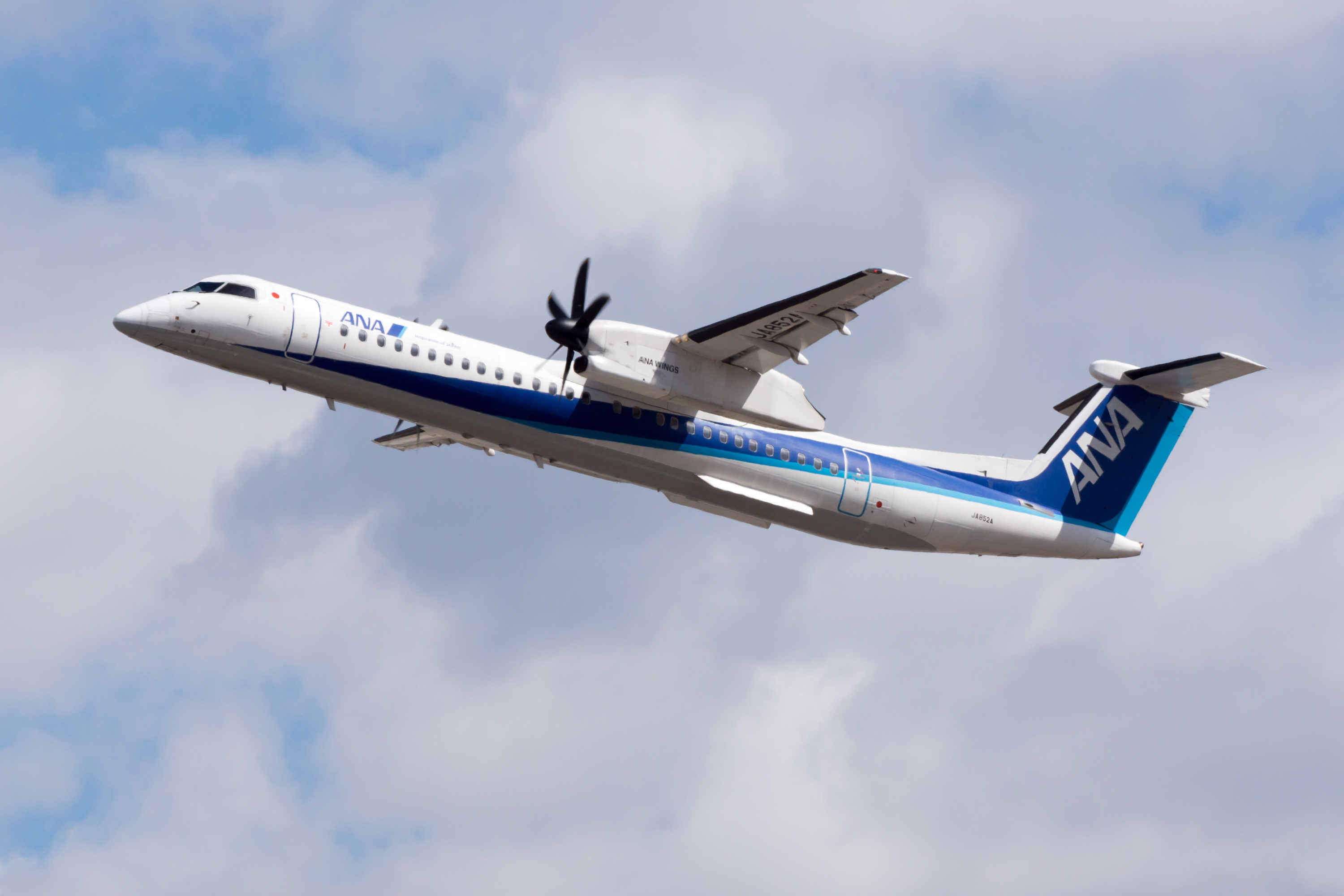
ANA Wings Bombardier Q400

== Fleet ==
=== Current fleet ===
As of July 2026, ANA Wings operates the following aircraft:

ANA Wings Fleet
Aircraft	In Fleet	Orders	Passengers	Notes
De Havilland Canada Dash 8-400	26	5	74	Some leased to ORC. Additional order of 7 deliveries until 2027.
Boeing 737-800	39		158	Operated for All Nippon Airways
Total	65	5		

=== Former fleet ===
As of August 2025, ANA Wings operated 39 Boeing 737-800 and 24 De Havilland Canada DHC-8-400.

ANA Wings previously operated the De Havilland Canada Dash 8-300, retired in 2014, and the Boeing 737-500, retired in 2020.

== Destinations ==
All destinations served lie in Japan. Current destinations served by the airline are listed below:

Region	City	Airport	Notes	Ref
Chūbu	Komatsu	Komatsu Airport		
Chūbu	Nagoya	Chubu Centrair International Airport	Hub	
Chūbu	Niigata	Niigata Airport		
Chūbu	Noto	Noto Airport		
Chūbu	Shizuoka	Shizuoka Airport		
Chūbu	Toyama	Toyama Airport		
Chūgoku	Hiroshima	Hiroshima Airport		
Chūgoku	Iwakuni	Iwakuni Airport		
Chūgoku	Masuda	Hagi-Iwami Airport		
Chūgoku	Okayama	Okayama Airport		
Chūgoku	Tottori	Tottori Airport		
Chūgoku	Yamaguchi	Yamaguchi Ube Airport		
Chūgoku	Yonago	Yonago Kitaro Airport		
Kantō	Tokyo	Haneda Airport	Hub	
Kantō	Tokyo	Narita International Airport	Hub	
Kyushu	Fukuoka	Fukuoka Airport	Hub	
Kyushu	Naha	Naha Airport	Hub	
Hokkaido	Asahikawa	Asahikawa Airport		
Hokkaido	Hakodate	Hakodate Airport		
Hokkaido	Kushiro	Kushiro Airport		
Hokkaido	Monbetsu	Monbetsu Airport		
Hokkaido	Nemuro/Nakashibetsu	Nemuro Nakashibetsu Airport		
Hokkaido	Ōzora	Memanbetsu Airport		
Hokkaido	Sapporo	New Chitose Airport	Hub	
Hokkaido	Wakkanai	Wakkanai Airport		
Izu Islands	Hachijō-jima	Hachijojima Airport		
Kansai	Kobe	Kobe Airport		
Kansai	Osaka	Itami Airport	Hub	
Kansai	Osaka	Kansai International Airport	Hub	
Kyushu	Gotō	Fukue Airport		
Kyushu	Ishigaki	New Ishigaki Airport		
Kyushu	Kagoshima	Kagoshima Airport		
Kyushu	Kumamoto	Kumamoto Airport		
Kyushu	Miyakojima	Miyako Airport		
Kyushu	Miyazaki	Miyazaki Airport		
Kyushu	Nagasaki	Nagasaki Airport		
Kyushu	Ōita	Oita Airport		
Kyushu	Saga	Saga Airport		
Shikoku	Kōchi	Kōchi Airport		
Shikoku	Matsuyama	Matsuyama Airport		
Shikoku	Takamatsu	Takamatsu Airport		
Shikoku	Tokushima	Tokushima Airport		
Tōhoku	Akita	Akita Airport		
Tōhoku	Aomori	Aomori Airport		
Tōhoku	Fukushima	Fukushima Airport		
Tōhoku	Ōdate/Noshiro	Odate–Noshiro Airport		
Tōhoku	Sendai	Sendai Airport		
Tōhoku	Shōnai	Shonai Airport		

=== Codeshare agreements ===
ANA Wings codeshares with the following airlines:

- All Nippon Airways

=== Interline agreements ===
ANA Wings interlines with the following airlines:

- Singapore Airlines
