= Air Next =

Low-cost airline of Japan (2004–2010)

Air Next Co., Ltd. エアーネクスト株式会社 Eā Nekusuto Kabushiki-gaisha
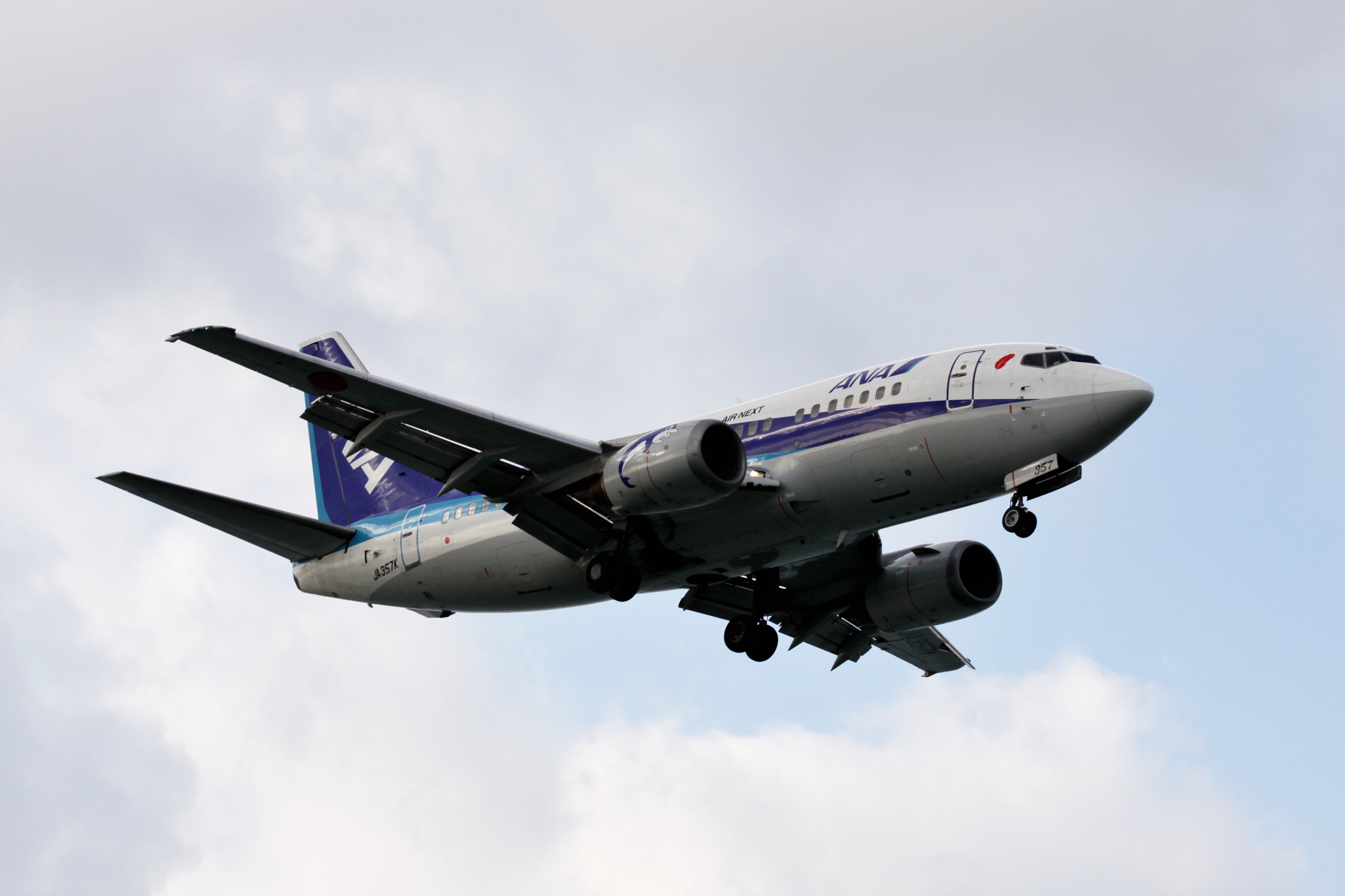
| IATA | ICAO | Call sign |
|---|---|---|
| 7A | NXA | BLUE-DOLPHIN |
- Founded: August 20, 2004
- Commenced operations: June 21, 2005
- Ceased operations: October 1, 2010 (merged with Air Central and Air Nippon Network to form ANA Wings)
- Hubs: Fukuoka Airport
- Alliance: Star Alliance (affiliate; 2004–2010)
- Fleet size: 14
- Destinations: 5
- Parent company: All Nippon Airways
- Headquarters: Fukuoka Airport, Hakata-ku, Fukuoka Prefecture, Japan
- Key people: Motomu Iwatani (president)
- Website: www.airnext.ana-g.com

Air Next was a low-cost airline based on the grounds of Fukuoka Airport in Hakata-ku, Fukuoka, Fukuoka Prefecture, Japan and a wholly owned subsidiary of All Nippon Airways (ANA). It operated domestic services from its main base at Fukuoka Airport. On October 1, 2010, Air Next, Air Central and Air Nippon Network were merged and rebranded as ANA Wings.

== History ==
The airline was established on August 20, 2004, and its first flight was on June 21, 2005, with a pair of Boeing 737-500 aircraft. Air Next received two more 737s by the end of 2006 and another three in 2007, bringing their fleet to a total of seven aircraft.

In February 2005 Air Next was headquartered in Minato, Tokyo.

Air Next aircraft carried ANA livery with the name "Air Next" in small letters on the fuselage and a dolphin painted on each engine. Flights were operated with ANA/NH flight numbers, although Air Next had its own airline codes.

== Destinations ==
- Fukuoka – Komatsu
- Fukuoka – Ishigaki
- Naha – Miyako
- Naha – Ishigaki

== Fleet ==
As of December 2009, the Air Next fleet included the following aircraft:

Air Next fleet
| Aircraft | In Fleet | Passengers |
|---|---|---|
| Boeing 737-500 | 14 | 126/133 |
