= Star Alliance =

Airline alliance

- Launch date: 14 May 1997; 29 years ago
- Full members: 26
- Destination airports: 1,300
- Destination countries: 195
- Annual passengers (M): 762
- Annual RPK (G): 1,739
- Fleet size: 5,033
- Headquarters: Frankfurt, Germany
- Management: Theo Panagiotoulias (CEO); Michael Rousseau (chairman)
- Alliance slogan: Together. Better. Connected.
- Website: www.staralliance.com

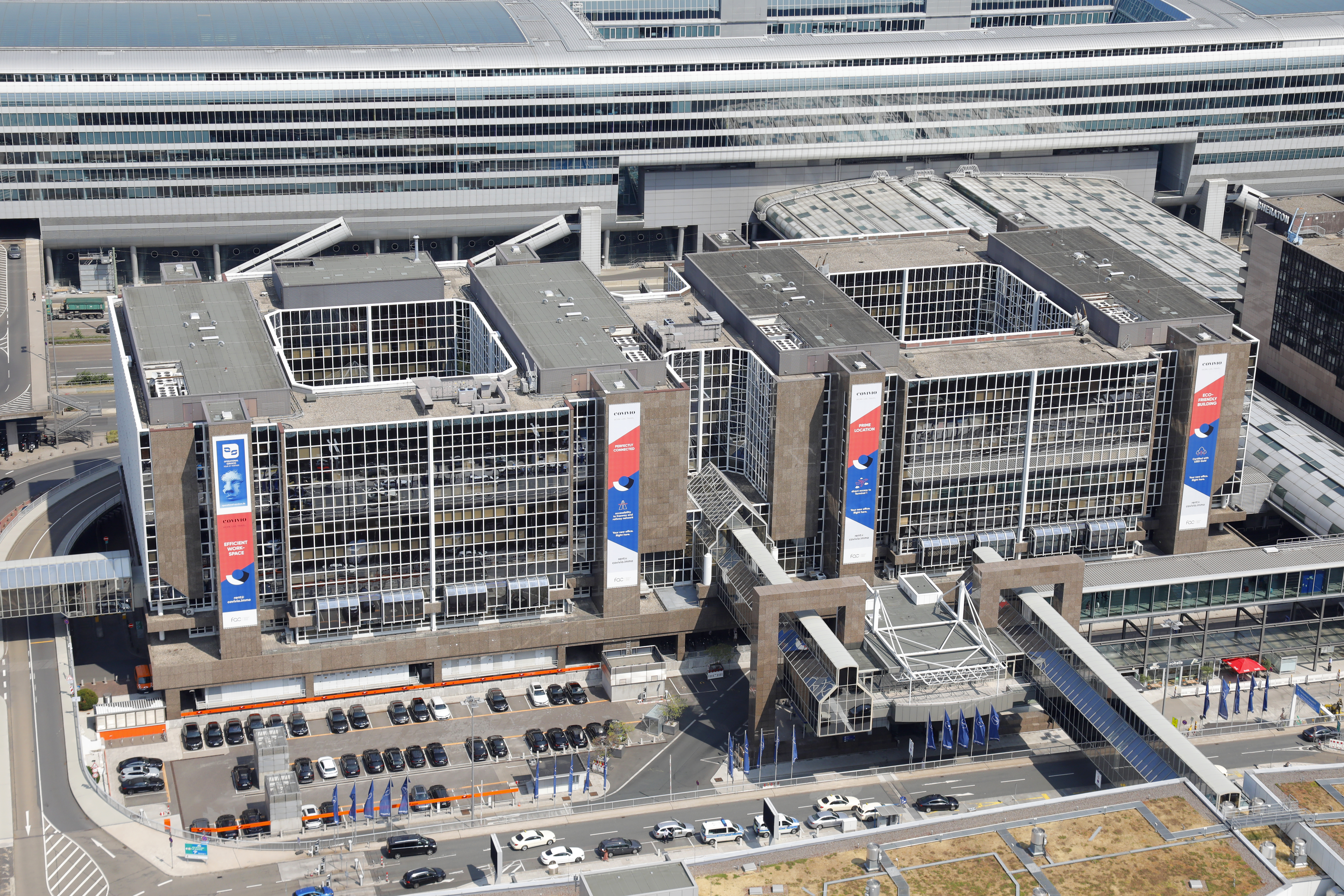
The head office of the alliance is at Frankfurt Airport Centre 1.

Star Alliance is an airline alliance headquartered in Frankfurt, Germany. Founded on 14 May 1997, it was the world's first global airline alliance. Star Alliance has 26 member airlines, the most of any airline alliance, which operate a combined fleet of over 5,000 aircraft, serving more than 1,300 airports in 195 countries on more than 19,000 daily departures.

As of April 2024, it is the world's largest airline alliance by market share, holding 17.4 percent compared to 13.7 percent for SkyTeam and 11.9 percent for Oneworld.

The alliance has a two-tier rewards programme, Silver and Gold, with incentives including priority boarding and upgrades. Like other airline alliances, Star Alliance airlines share airport terminals (known as co-locations), and many member aircraft are painted in the alliance's livery.

== History ==
=== 1997–1999: Founding and early years ===
The Star Alliance was announced on 14 May 1997 by five airlines from three continents: Air Canada, Lufthansa, Scandinavian Airlines, Thai Airways International and United Airlines. The group adopted a shared star-shaped logo, with each point representing a founding member. Its first slogan was "The Airline Network for Earth," and it aimed to connect passengers to major cities worldwide. Advertising efforts were managed by Young & Rubicam, with a budget of $25 million (€18 million).

VARIG, a now-defunct Brazilian airline, joined the alliance on 22 October 1997, marking its expansion into South America. Ansett Australia and Air New Zealand also joined, extending the network into Australia and the Pacific. With these additions, the alliance served 720 destinations in 110 countries and operated a combined fleet of 1,650 aircraft. All Nippon Airways became the second Asian airline to join on 15 October 1999.

=== 2000s: Expansion and first decade ===
During the early 2000s, a number of airlines joined Star Alliance; the Austrian Airlines Group (Austrian Airlines, Tyrolean Airways and Lauda Air) joined on 26 March 2000 and Singapore Airlines on 1 April. BMI and Mexicana joined on 1 July, bringing the alliance's membership to 13. With Singapore Airlines' entry into the alliance, Thai Airways considered moving to Oneworld, but eventually decided to remain. The addition of BMI made London Heathrow the only European hub with two alliances. During the year, Emirates considered joining Star Alliance, but decided against it. That year the now-defunct BWIA West Indies Airways, which had entered an alliance with United Airlines, considered becoming a member but did not. In 2000, the alliance also opened its first three business centres (in Los Angeles, Frankfurt and Bangkok) and announced the formation of an Alliance Management Team (AMT), the partnership's executive body. In September 2001, Ansett Australia (the alliance's only Australian member) left Star Alliance due to bankruptcy, giving most of the Australian market to Qantas (a Oneworld member). That year, Star Alliance announced the appointment of a new CEO, Jaan Albrecht.

Partner airlines promoted the Star Alliance brand with a 'Round the World' ticket (RWT) that offered choices of 19,000, 21,000, and 23,000 miles with stopovers in 15 cities, valid for one year.

Asiana Airlines joined the alliance on 28 March 2003, Spanair on 1 May 2003, followed by LOT Polish Airlines (Poland's flag carrier) joining in October. Around this time, Mexicana Airlines left the alliance after deciding not to renew a codeshare agreement with United Airlines, later joining Oneworld. US Airways joined the alliance in May 2004, becoming its second US-based airline. In November, Adria Airways, Blue1 and Croatia Airlines joined the alliance as its first three regional members.

Although Star Alliance invited Lineas Aereas Azteca to join in 2005, the airline filed for bankruptcy in mid-2007. TAP Air Portugal joined on 14 March 2005, adding African destinations to the network. In April 2006, Swiss International Air Lines, the alliance's sixth European airline, and South African Airways (its first African carrier) became the 17th and 18th members.

By May 2007, Star Alliance's 10th anniversary, its members had a combined 16,000 daily departures to 855 destinations in 155 countries and served 406 million passengers annually. The alliance introduced Biosphere Connections, a partnership with UNESCO, the International Union for Conservation of Nature (IUCN), and the Ramsar Convention on Wetlands to promote environmental sustainability.

Today, nearly 30% of global air travellers use the services of our member carriers or, looking at it from an overall industry perspective, two-thirds of worldwide air travellers use one of the three airline alliances.

— Jaan Albrecht, former Star Alliance CEO

VARIG left the alliance on 31 January 2007, and the two Chinese airlines, Air China and Shanghai Airlines, joined on 12 December.

On 1 April 2008, Turkish Airlines joined the alliance after a 15-month integration process beginning in December 2006, becoming its 20th member. EgyptAir, Egypt's national airline and Star Alliance's second African carrier, joined on 11 July 2008.

On 27 October 2009, Continental Airlines became the 25th member of Star Alliance after leaving SkyTeam three days earlier. According to Alliance CEO Jaan Albrecht, "Bringing Continental Airlines into Star Alliance has been a truly unique experience. This is the first time an airline has moved directly from one alliance to another, and I would like to thank all those involved in ensuring a smooth switch". At the time, it was rumoured that the switch was Continental's first move in a planned merger with United Airlines. Eventually on 2 May 2010, United and Continental announced they would be merging under the United name; the merger was completed on 1 October 2010. On 26 December 2009, Brussels Airlines joined the alliance.

=== 2010s: Further expansion and second decade of operations ===
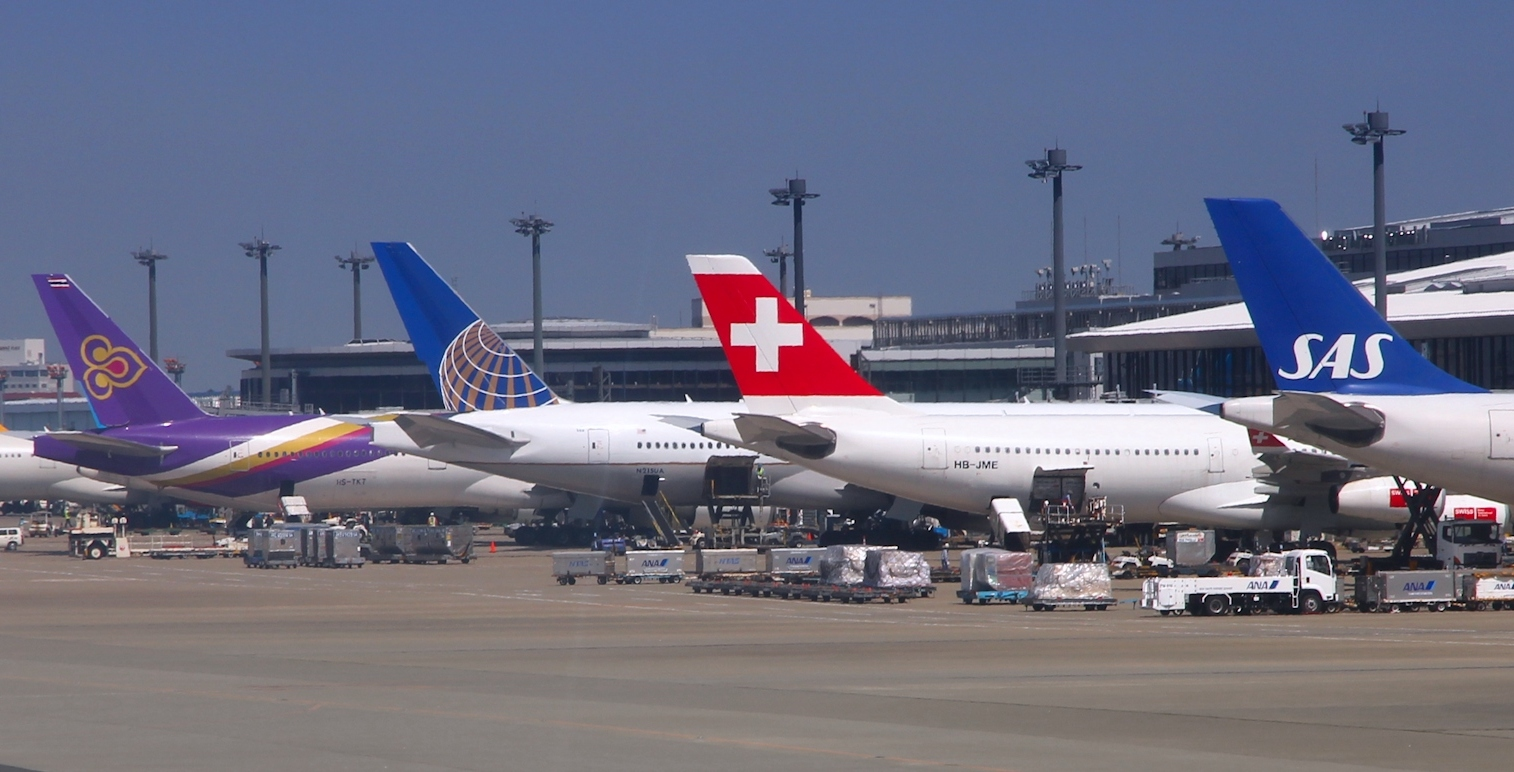
Four then-members of Star Alliance at Narita Airport in April 2012: Thai, United, Swiss and SAS

Brazilian carrier TAM Airlines joined Star Alliance on 13 May 2010, increasing its foothold in South America. Aegean Airlines, Greece's largest airline by number of passengers, joined on 30 June.

Shanghai Airlines left the alliance on 31 October 2010 when it merged with China Eastern Airlines, a SkyTeam member. On 29 September, the chief executive board approved Ethiopian Airlines as Star Alliance's 30th member, though Ethiopian did not officially join the alliance until December of the following year. In 2010, the alliance flew to 1,172 airports in 181 countries, with about 21,200 daily departures.

Since 2011, the alliance has gained several large members, but it has lost others due to collapse or mergers. On 13 December 2011, Ethiopian Airlines joined, adding five countries and 24 destinations to the alliance's map.

In 2012, Spanair ceased operations, and BMI left after being acquired by International Airlines Group (IAG), the parent company of Oneworld members Iberia and British Airways. BMI was integrated into British Airways. In North America, Continental Airlines was fully integrated into United Airlines. On 21 June, Avianca, TACA Airlines (integrated into Avianca in 2013) and Copa Airlines joined, massively increasing the alliance's Latin American presence. In November, Blue1 left after becoming an affiliate of parent Scandinavian Airlines, while Shenzhen Airlines joined, augmenting Air China's Chinese network. Taiwanese carrier EVA Air then joined on 18 June 2013, becoming the alliance's 28th member. On 13 December, Air India was again invited to begin an integration process with the alliance.

Following this string of expansions, 2014 opened with two major departures through mergers. First, Brazilian carrier TAM Airlines merged with LAN Airlines to become LATAM Airlines Group. Next, US Airways completed its merger with American Airlines and also left the alliance. Both parent companies stayed with Oneworld. On 24 June, the alliance approved Air India, which joined on 11 July, leaving the alliance at 27 members.

Future expansion centres around the addition of Connecting Partners, subsidiaries or partners of alliance members, which will add connectivity to the alliance without becoming full members. Avianca Brasil joined as an affiliate on 22 July 2015, strengthening the alliance's presence in Brazil. In 2015, the alliance announced their new Connecting Partner model, with South African Airways' low-cost subsidiary Mango initially being announced to be the first. These plans did not materialise, and Juneyao Airlines, which codeshares with Shenzhen Airlines, joined as the first Connecting Partner on 23 May 2017. On 20 August 2019, Star Alliance announced affiliate member Avianca Brasil's exit from the alliance from 1 September 2019. The departure, however, would not affect Avianca's membership. On 30 September 2019, Adria Airways ceased operations, and the airline exited the alliance on 2 October 2019.

=== 2020s: 25th anniversary and restructuring of several member airlines ===
The now-defunct regional subsidiary of Thai Airways, Thai Smile, joined as a Connecting Partner in February 2020. In January 2024, the Thai Smile brand was discontinued and folded into the parent airline as a result of the reorganisation of Thai Airways International following bankruptcy.

On 16 November 2020, Asiana Airlines announced its plans to exit the alliance. Asiana will merge with Korean Air, the South Korean Government confirmed, in a $1.6 billion acquisition by the SkyTeam member. After the United States Department of Justice approved the merger in December 2024, the merger was completed and Asiana Airlines became a subsidiary of Korean Air. It was announced in May 2026 that Asiana would be integrated into Korean Air by 17 December 2026.

In October 2023, as a part of the restructuring of Scandinavian Airlines' parent company SAS Group, Air France-KLM, along with the Government of Denmark and two financial firms (Castlelake and Lind Invest), announced plans to invest in Scandinavian Airlines. In March 2024, the US Bankruptcy Court approved the investment, along with the Stockholm District Court on 12 June 2024 and the European Commission on 28 June 2024. As a result of the investment, Scandinavian Airlines left Star Alliance on 31 August 2024 and joined SkyTeam on 1 September 2024.

In January 2025, Lufthansa Group acquired a 41 percent stake in ITA Airways, a SkyTeam member. The European Commission approved the acquisition of ITA in July 2024. On 3 February 2025, ITA Airways announced that it was leaving SkyTeam following the acquisition by Lufthansa Group. ITA Airways joined Star Alliance on 1 April 2026.

== Member airlines and affiliates ==
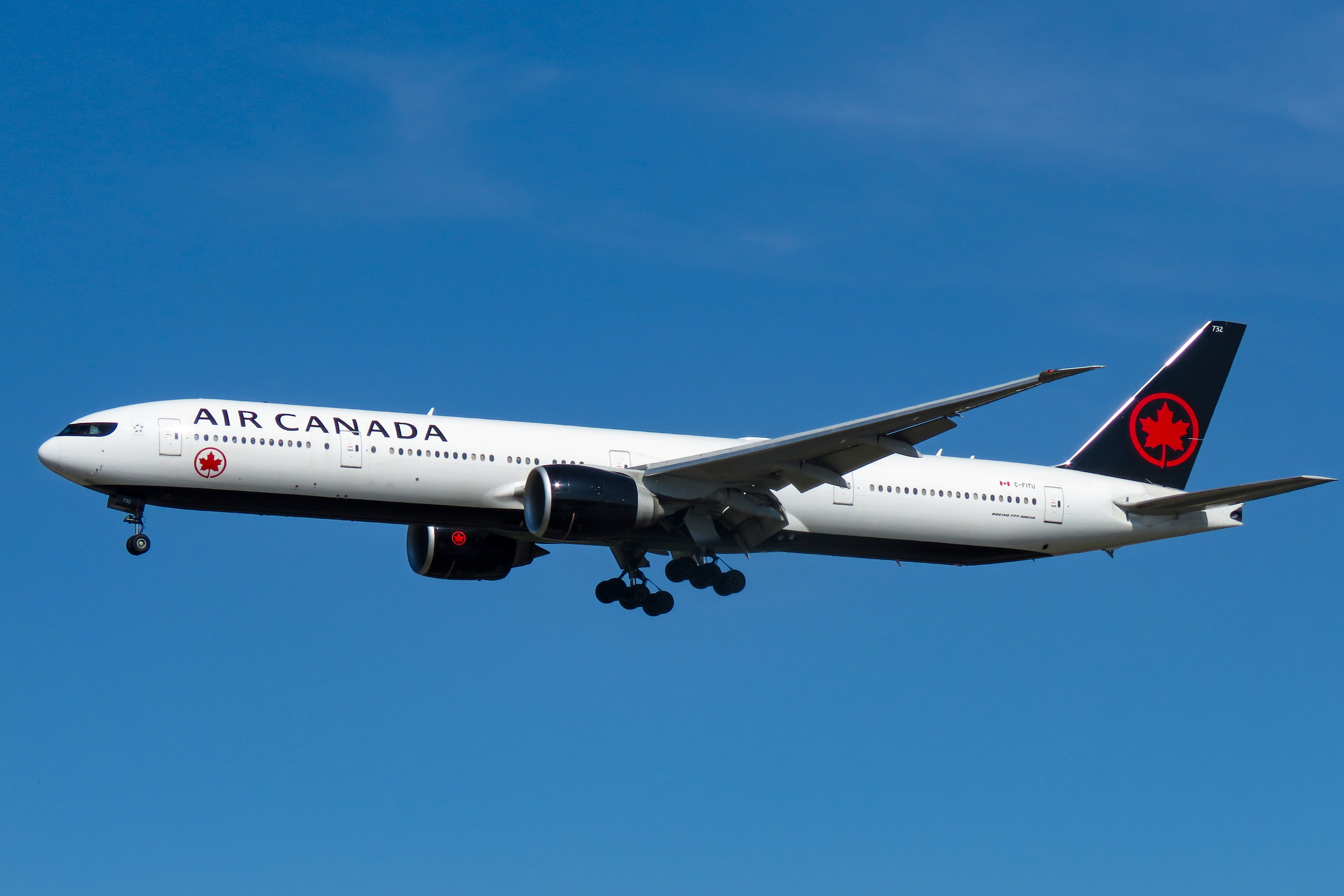
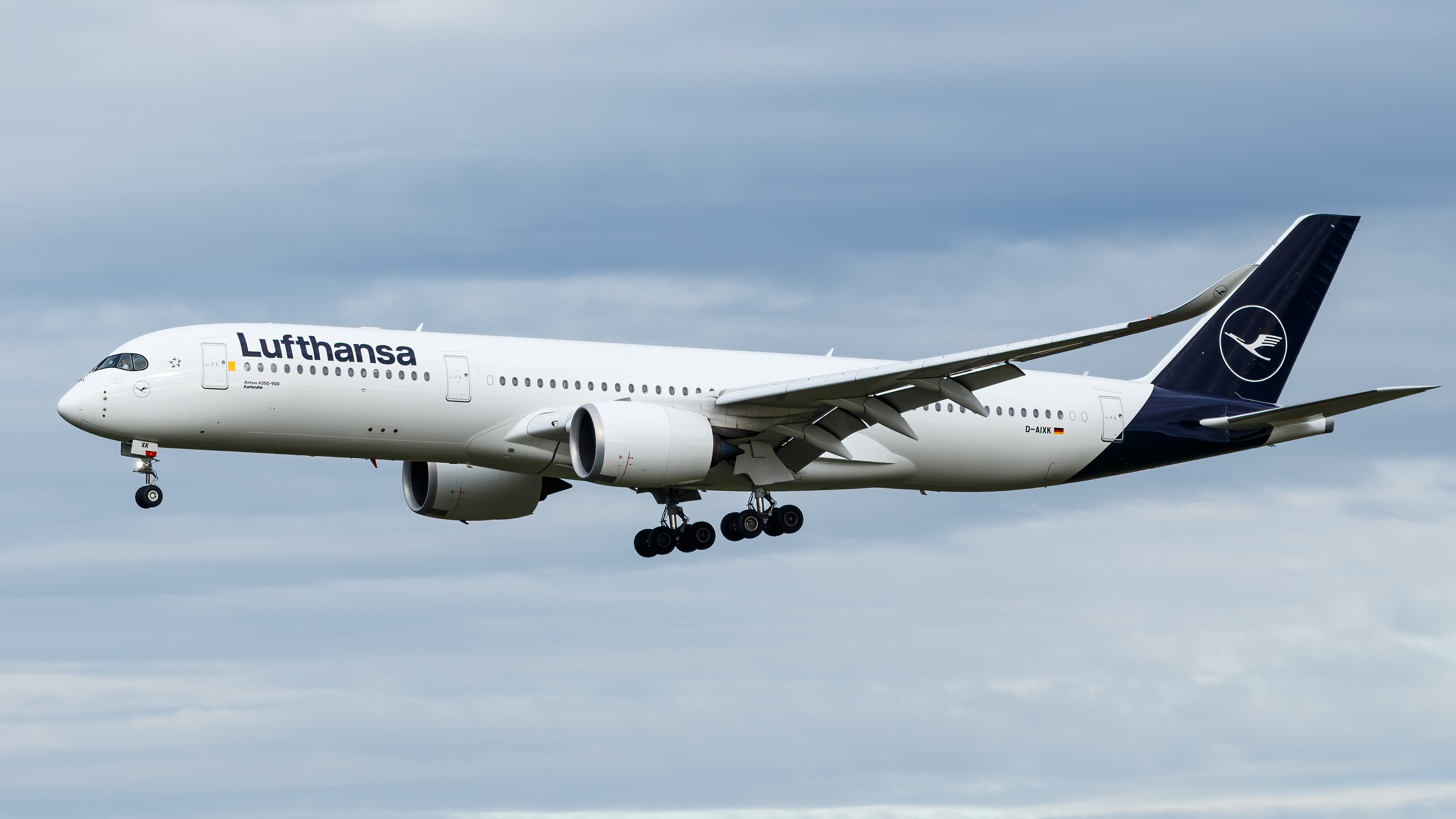
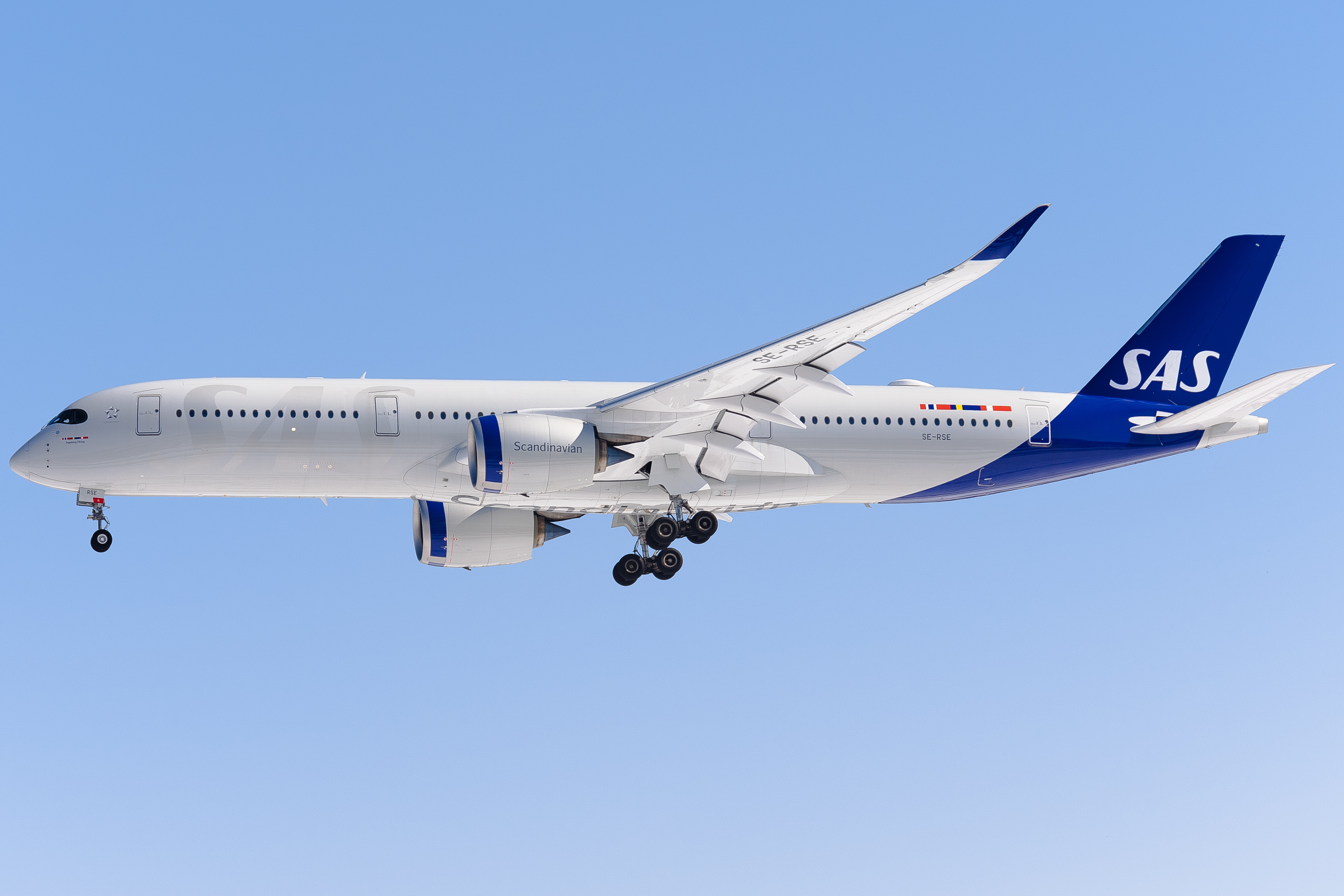
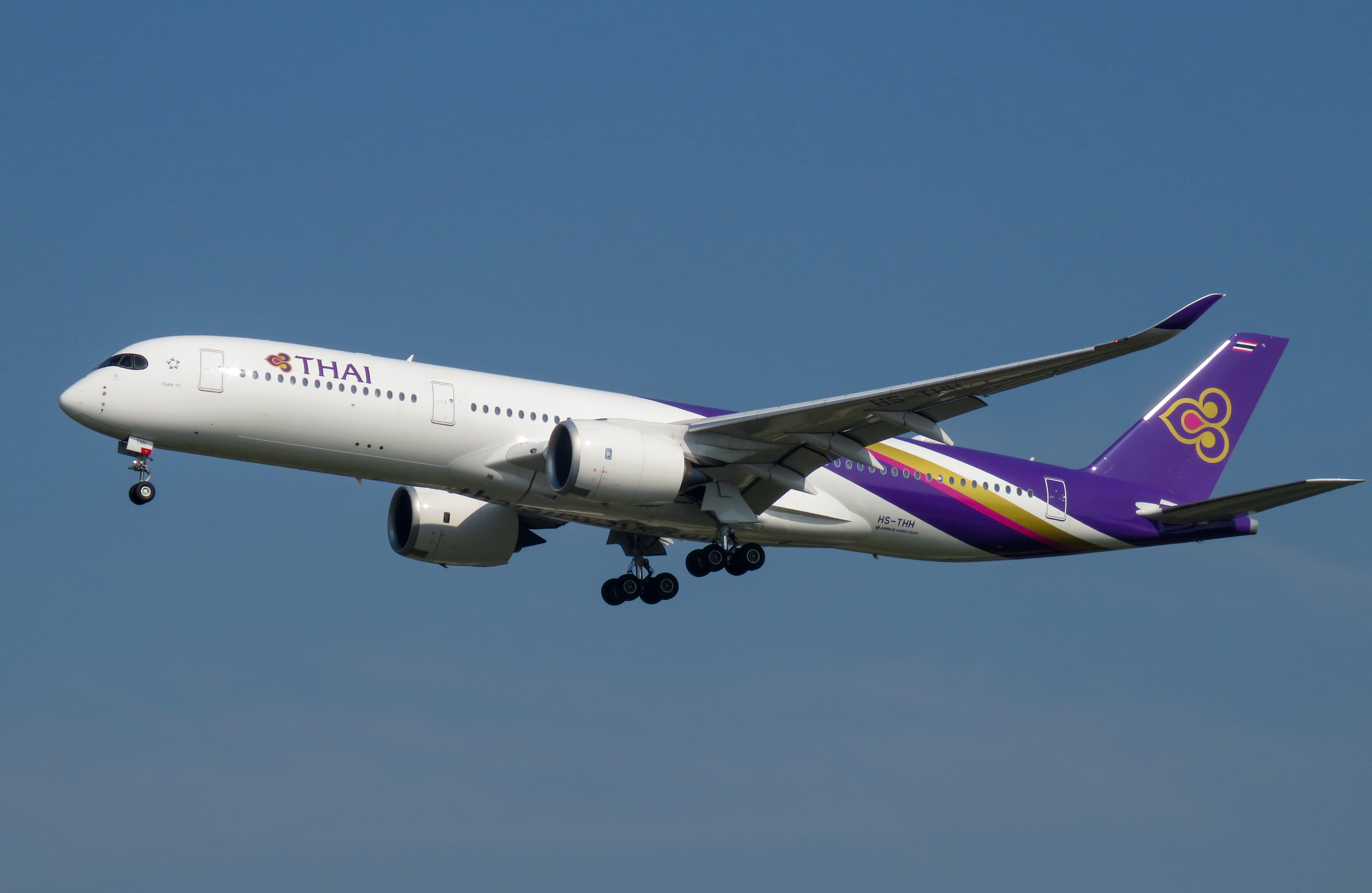
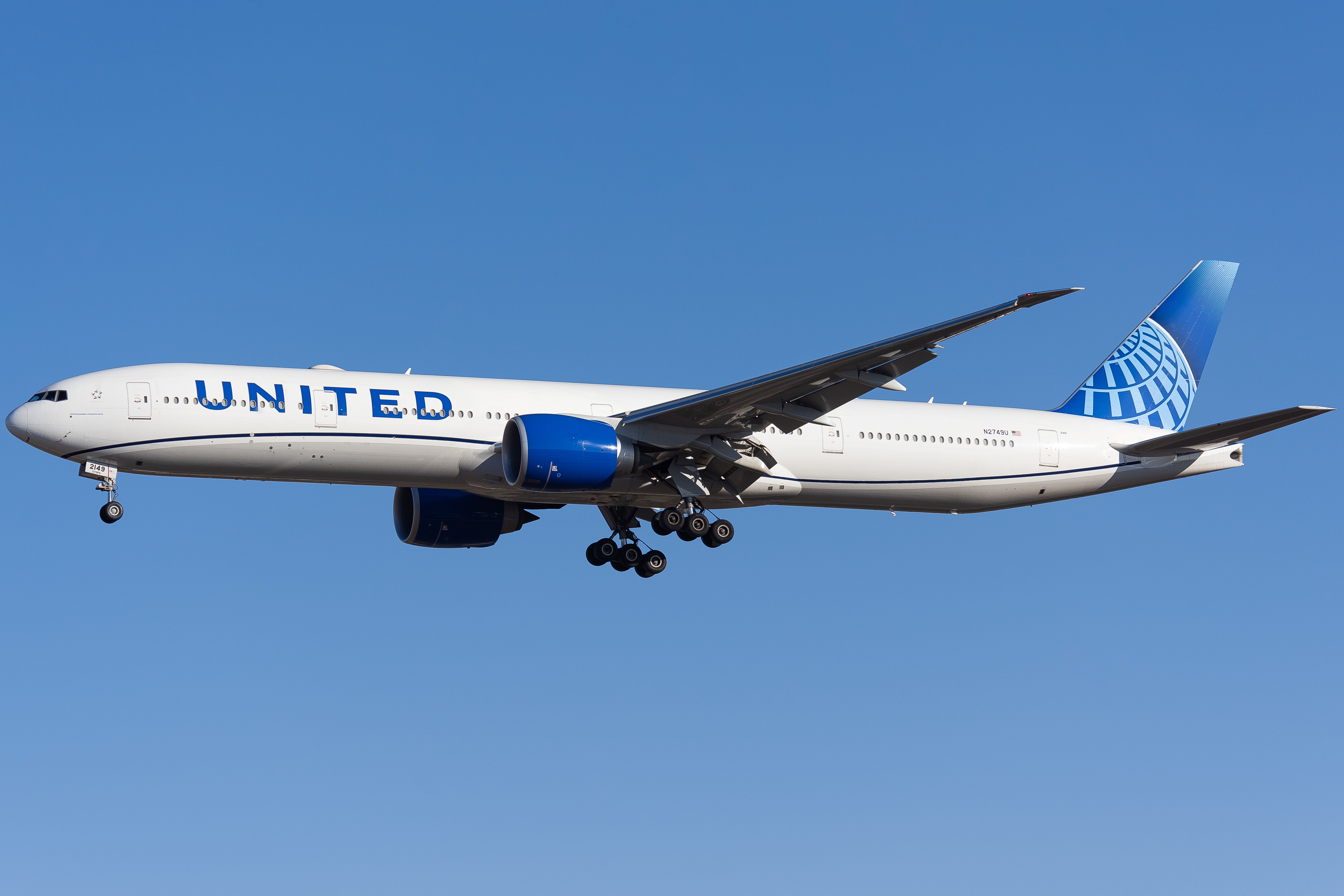
Air Canada, Lufthansa, Scandinavian Airlines (switched to SkyTeam in 2024), Thai Airways International, and United Airlines are the five founding members of the alliance.

=== Members and affiliates ===
Member	Joined	Member affiliates
(Greece) Aegean Airlines	30 June 2010	(Greece) Olympic Air
Air Canada^{[A]}	14 May 1997	Air Canada Express^{[B]} Air Canada Jetz; Air Canada Rouge
Air China	12 December 2007	—N/a
Air India	11 July 2014	—N/a
Air New Zealand	3 May 1999	—N/a
(Japan) All Nippon Airways	15 October 1999	(Japan) ANA Wings
(South Korea) Asiana Airlines	28 March 2003	—N/a
(Austria) Austrian Airlines^{[E]}	26 March 2000	—N/a
(Colombia) Avianca	21 June 2012	Avianca Costa Rica; Avianca Ecuador; Avianca El Salvador (Colombia) Avianca Express; Avianca Guatemala
(Belgium) Brussels Airlines^{[E]}	9 December 2009	—N/a
(Panama) Copa Airlines	21 June 2012	—N/a
Croatia Airlines	18 November 2004	—N/a
(Egypt) Egyptair	11 July 2008	—N/a
(Ethiopia) Ethiopian Airlines	13 December 2011	—N/a
(Taiwan) EVA Air	18 June 2013	—N/a
(Italy) ITA Airways^{[E]}	1 April 2026	—N/a
(Poland) LOT Polish Airlines	26 October 2003	—N/a
(Germany) Lufthansa^{[A]}^{[E]}	14 May 1997	(Germany) Lufthansa City Airlines
(China) Shenzhen Airlines	29 November 2012	—N/a
Singapore Airlines	1 April 2000	—N/a
(South Africa) South African Airways	10 April 2006	—N/a
(Switzerland) Swiss International Air Lines^{[E]}	1 April 2006	—N/a
TAP Air Portugal	14 March 2005	(Portugal) TAP Express^{[C]}
(Thailand) Thai Airways International^{[A]}	14 May 1997	—N/a
(Turkey) Turkish Airlines	1 April 2008	—N/a
(United States) United Airlines^{[A]}	14 May 1997	(United States) United Express^{[D]}

^{A}Founding member.
^{B}Air Canada Express flights are operated by Jazz Aviation and PAL Airlines.
^{C}TAP Express flights are operated by Portugália Airlines.
^{D}United Express flights are operated by CommuteAir, GoJet Airlines, Mesa Airlines, Republic Airways and SkyWest Airlines.
^{E}Part of the Lufthansa Group, which owns Austrian Airlines, Brussels Airlines, ITA Airways (41%), Lufthansa and Swiss International Air Lines.

=== Connecting partners ===
Connecting Partner	Joined
(China) Juneyao Air	23 May 2017

=== Intermodal partners ===
Since August 2022, the German railway provider Deutsche Bahn has been the first intermodal partner of the Star Alliance, whose airlines have been able to assign their own flight numbers for trains. In March 2025, Austrian Federal Railways became the second intermodal partner.

Intermodal Partner	Joined
(Germany) Deutsche Bahn	1 August 2022
(Austria) Austrian Federal Railways	19 March 2025

=== Former members ===
Former member	Joined	Exited	Affiliates	Notes
(Slovenia) Adria Airways	18 November 2004	30 September 2019	(Switzerland) Darwin Airline	Ceased operations on 30 September 2019.
Ansett Australia	3 May 1999	12 September 2001	(Australia) Aeropelican (Australia) Hazelton Airlines (Australia) Kendell Airlines (Australia) Skywest Airlines; Ansett New Zealand	Suffered financial collapse on 12 September 2001. Ansett resumed operations on 1 October 2001, but would permanently cease operations on 4 March 2002. In 2002, Hazelton and Kendell merged to become Rex Airlines.
(Finland) Blue1	3 November 2004	1 November 2012	—N/a	Left the alliance on 1 November 2012 after SAS took over mainline operations, was a member affiliate of Scandinavian Airlines (2012–2015), and is now a part of CityJet.
(United Kingdom) British Midland International	1 July 2000	20 April 2012	(United Kingdom) BMI Regional	Merged into British Airways, an International Airlines Group division and a Oneworld member, on 20 April 2012.
(United States) Continental Airlines	27 October 2009	3 March 2012	(United States) Continental Connection (United States) Continental Express (United States) Continental Micronesia	Merged with United Airlines on 3 March 2012.
(Mexico) Mexicana	1 July 2000	31 March 2004	(Mexico) Aerocaribe	Left the alliance in 2004 after deciding not to renew a codeshare alliance with United Airlines, opting instead to codeshare with American Airlines and then joined Oneworld in 2009. Ceased operations on 28 August 2010.
(China) Shanghai Airlines	12 December 2007	31 October 2010	—N/a	Acquired by China Eastern Airlines, a SkyTeam member, on 31 October 2010.
(Spain) Spanair	1 May 2003	27 January 2012	(Spain) AeBal	Ceased operations on 27 January 2012.
(Denmark) (Norway) (Sweden) Scandinavian Airlines	14 May 1997	31 August 2024	(Finland) Blue1 (Republic of Ireland) SAS Connect (Sweden) SAS Link	Founding member; partly acquired by Air France–KLM, two SkyTeam members.
(El Salvador) TACA Airlines	21 June 2012	27 May 2013	(El Salvador) TACA Regional	Merged with Avianca on 27 May 2013; renamed Avianca El Salvador.
(Brazil) TAM Airlines	13 May 2010	30 March 2014	TAM Paraguay	Merged with LAN Airlines, a Oneworld member, on 30 March 2014.
(United States) US Airways	4 May 2004	30 March 2014	(United States) US Airways Express (United States) US Airways Shuttle	Merged with American Airlines, a Oneworld member, on 30 March 2014.
(Brazil) VARIG	22 October 1997	31 January 2007	(Brazil) Nordeste (Brazil) Rio Sul	Ceased operations on 20 July 2006.

=== Former affiliates of current members ===
Member	Former affiliate	Joined	Exited	Notes
Air Canada	(Canada) Air Alliance	1997	1999	Folded into Air Canada Express.
Air Canada	(Canada) Air BC	1997	2001	Folded into Air Canada Express.
Air Canada	Air Canada Tango	2001	2004	Folded into Air Canada.
Air Canada	(Canada) Air Nova	1997	2001	Folded into Air Canada Express.
Air Canada	(Canada) Air Ontario	1997	2001	Folded into Air Canada Express.
Air Canada	(Canada) Zip	2002	2004	Folded into Air Canada.
Air China	Air China Inner Mongolia	2014	2025	Folded into Air China
Air New Zealand	(New Zealand) Air Nelson	1999	2019	Folded into Air New Zealand.
Air New Zealand	(New Zealand) Mount Cook Airlines	1999	2019	Folded into Air New Zealand.
(Japan) All Nippon Airways	(Japan) Air Next	2004	2010	Merged with ANA Wings.
(Japan) All Nippon Airways	(Japan) Air Nippon	1999	2012	Merged with ANA Wings.
(Colombia) Avianca	(Brazil) Avianca Brasil	2015	2019	Ceased operations after filing for bankruptcy protection.
(Colombia) Avianca	Avianca Honduras	2013	2018	Suspended operations in 2018 and retired its fleet in 2020. Currently dormant.
(Colombia) Avianca	(Peru) Avianca Perú	2012	2020	Ceased operations when Avianca filed for Chapter 11 bankruptcy amid the COVID-19 pandemic.
(Austria) Austrian Airlines	(Austria) Lauda Air	2000	2013	Replaced by Austrian Airlines operations, now known as Austrian myHoliday.
(Austria) Austrian Airlines	(Austria) Tyrolean Airways	2000	2015	Folded into Austrian Airlines.
(Panama) Copa Airlines	Copa Airlines Colombia	2010	2020	Ceased operations in 2020 and folded into Copa Airlines. Its routes are now operated by Wingo.
(Egypt) EgyptAir	(Egypt) EgyptAir Express	2006	2019	Merged with EgyptAir.
(Germany) Lufthansa	(Italy) Lufthansa Italia	2009	2011	Folded into Lufthansa.
(Germany) Lufthansa	(Germany) Lufthansa CityLine	1997	2026	Folded into Lufthansa.
(South Africa) South African Airways	(South Africa) South African Express	2006	2020	Folded into South African Airways.
(Switzerland) Swiss International Air Lines	(Switzerland) Swiss Global Air Lines	2007	2018	Folded into Swiss International Air Lines after being dissolved.
(Thailand) Thai Airways International	(Thailand) Thai Smile	2011	2024	Connecting partner from 2020, folded into Thai Airways.
(Turkey) Turkish Airlines	(Turkey) AnadoluJet	2008	2024	Re-established as AJet.
(United States) United Airlines	(United States) United Shuttle	1997	2001	Became part of United Airlines.
(United States) United Airlines	(United States) TED	2004	2009	Folded into United Airlines.

== Customer services ==
=== Frequent flyer programmes, Star Alliance Silver and Gold status ===
Status miles can be earned across all Star Alliance member airlines' frequent flyer programmes using a single frequent flyer account, allowing members to attain Star Alliance Silver status or progress to Gold status. Higher-tier status levels of each member airline's frequent flyer programmes are aligned with the two uniformly recognised Star Alliance status levels: Star Alliance Silver and Star Alliance Gold. Both status levels entitle special benefits and privileges to passengers when travelling on the Star Alliance network. Membership in any Star Alliance airline programme grants full access to the entire Star Alliance network without the need to register with any additional programme.

Star Alliance Silver benefits include access to priority reservations, waitlist, and priority airport stand-by. Star Alliance Gold benefits include priority reservations waitlist, airport stand-by, check-in and baggage handling, additional checked luggage allowance, and access to designated lounges operated by Star Alliance or member airlines.

Frequent flyer programme list by airline and Star Alliance status equivalents
Airline	Frequent flyer programme	Star Alliance Silver equivalent status(es)	Star Alliance Gold equivalent status(es)
(Austria) Austrian Airlines	Miles & More	Frequent Traveller	Senator; HON Circle
(Belgium) Brussels Airlines	Miles & More	Frequent Traveller	Senator; HON Circle
Croatia Airlines	Miles & More	Frequent Traveller	Senator; HON Circle
(Italy) ITA Airways	Miles & More	Frequent Traveller	Senator; HON Circle
(Poland) LOT Polish Airlines	Miles & More	Frequent Traveller	Senator; HON Circle
(Germany) Lufthansa	Miles & More	Frequent Traveller	Senator; HON Circle
(Germany) Lufthansa City Airlines	Miles & More	Frequent Traveller	Senator; HON Circle
(Switzerland) Swiss International Air Lines	Miles & More	Frequent Traveller	Senator; HON Circle
(Greece) Aegean Airlines	Miles+Bonus	Miles+Bonus Silver	Miles+Bonus Gold
Air Canada	Aeroplan	25K; 35K	50K; 75K; Super Elite 100K
Air China	PhoenixMiles	Silver	Gold; Platinum
(China) Shenzhen Airlines	PhoenixMiles	Silver	Gold; Platinum
Air India	Maharaja Club	Silver	Gold; Platinum
Air New Zealand	Koru	Silver	Gold; Platinum Black
(Japan) All Nippon Airways	ANA Mileage Club	Bronze	Super Flyers; Diamond; Platinum
(South Korea) Asiana Airlines	Asiana Club	Gold	Diamond; Diamond Plus; Platinum
(Colombia) Avianca	LifeMiles	Silver	Gold; Diamond; Cenit
(Panama) Copa Airlines	ConnectMiles	ConnectMilesSilver	Gold; Platinum; Presidential Platinum
(Egypt) Egyptair	EgyptAir Plus	Silver	Gold; Elite; Platinum
(Ethiopia) Ethiopian Airlines	ShebaMiles	Silver	Gold; Platinum
(Taiwan) EVA Air	Infinity MileageLands	Silver	Gold; Diamond
Singapore Airlines	KrisFlyer	Elite Silver	Elite Gold; PPS Club; Solitaire PPS Club
(South Africa) South African Airways	Voyager	Silver	Gold; Platinum
TAP Air Portugal	Miles&Go	Silver	Gold; Navigator
(Thailand) Thai Airways International	Royal Orchid Plus	Silver	Gold; Platinum
(Turkey) Turkish Airlines	Miles & Smiles	Classic Plus	Elite; Elite Plus
(United States) United Airlines	MileagePlus	Premier Silver	Premier Gold; Premier Platinum; Premier 1K; Global Services

=== Codeshares ===
In 2004, Star Alliance introduced a "regional" concept to expand its reach through smaller regional carriers. To join, these regional members needed sponsorship from an existing alliance member. The alliance no longer labels airlines as "regional" members, instead referring to all 27 airlines simply as "members."

The common use of codeshare agreements led to suspicions of anti-competitive behaviour. The European Union suspected the alliance of operating as a virtual merger of its members, with speculation that, if regulations were relaxed, the members might merge into one corporation.

== Livery and logo ==
Some Star Alliance members paint some of their aircraft with the alliance livery, usually a white fuselage with "Star Alliance" across it and a black tail fin with the alliance logo. This livery was introduced in 2002 with Asiana Airlines being the first airline to utilise it. Some variations exist: Singapore Airlines formerly kept its logo on the tails of its aircraft, but now uses the Star Alliance logo on white tails, while Air New Zealand now uses full black livery with reversed coloured original Star Alliance livery elements. Aircraft painted in an airline's regular livery have the Star Alliance logo near the cockpit.

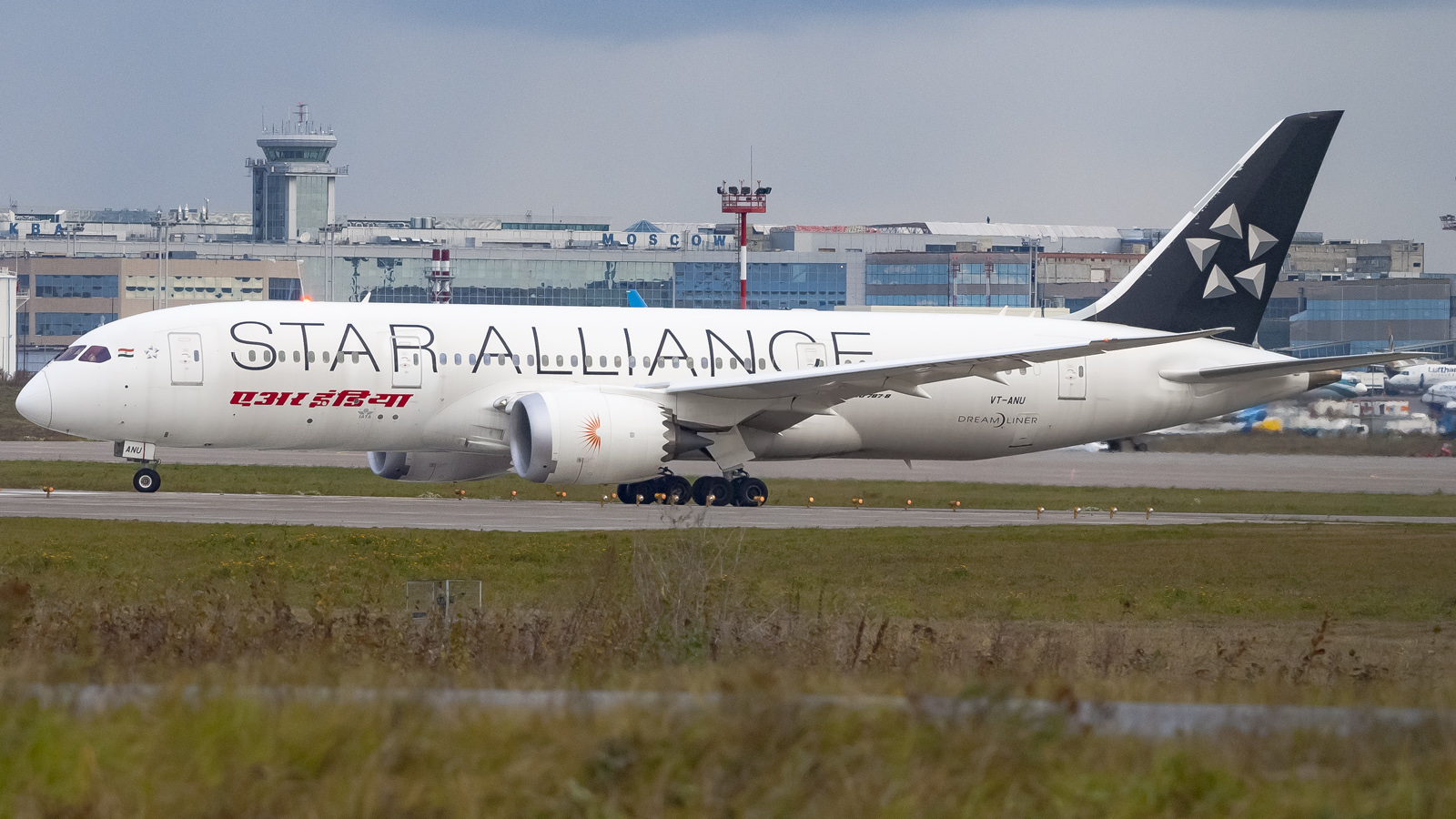
An Air India Boeing 787-8 in the present-day Star Alliance livery

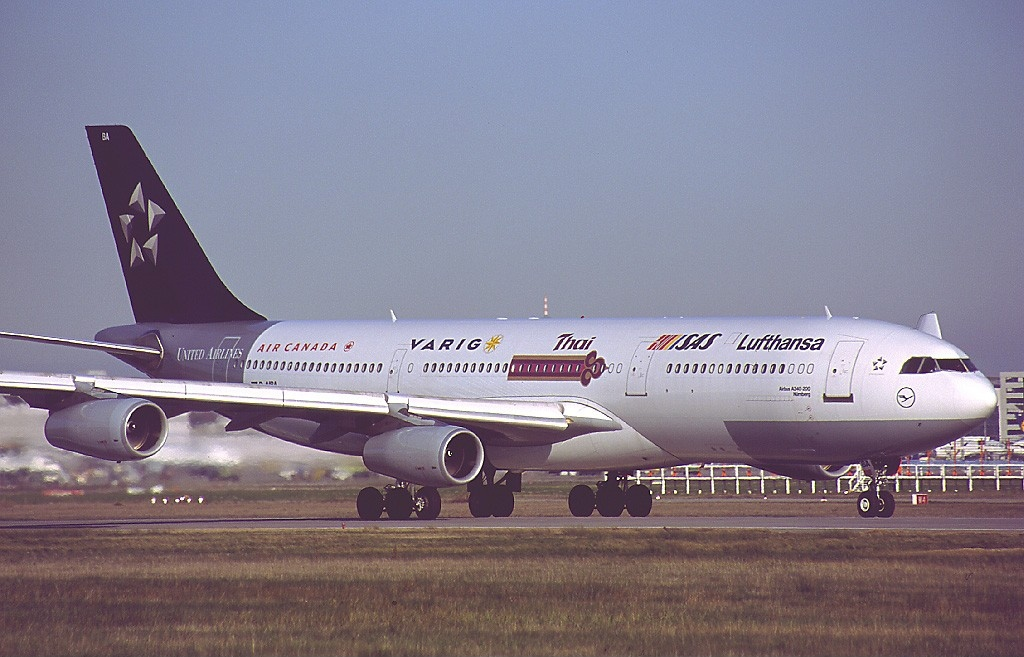
A former Lufthansa A340-200 in the first Star Alliance livery

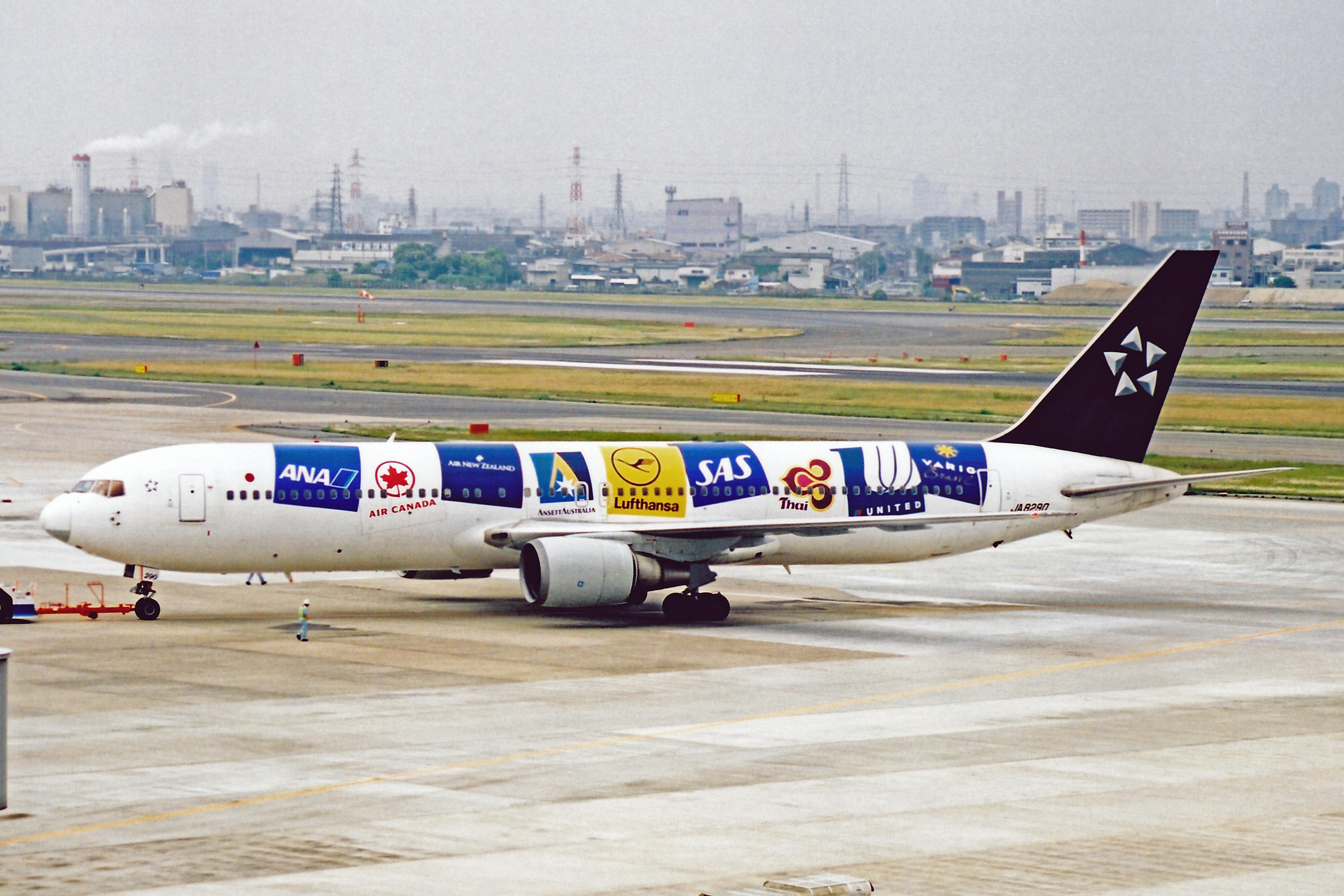
A former All Nippon Airways Boeing 767-300 wearing the second Star Alliance livery

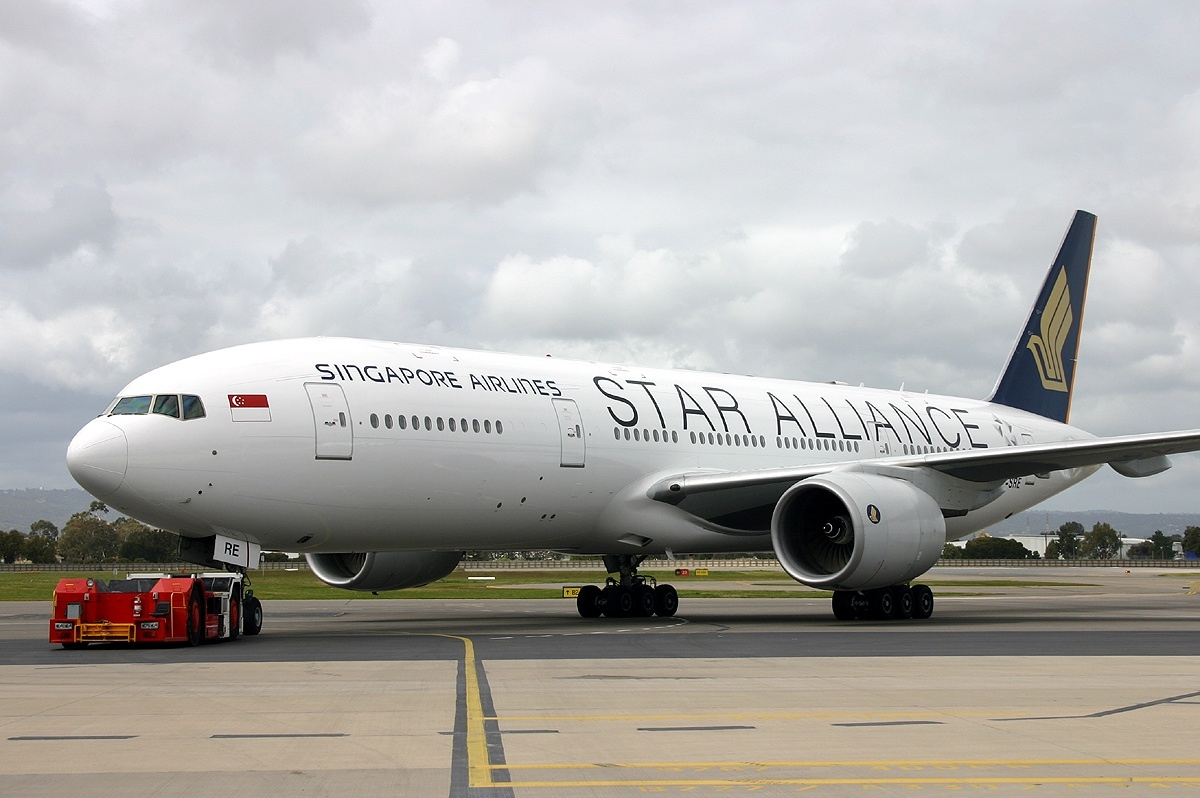
A former Singapore Airlines Boeing 777-200ER in its former Star Alliance livery: note the tail still shows the Singapore Airlines logo.

Singapore Airlines Boeing 777 in recent star alliance livery

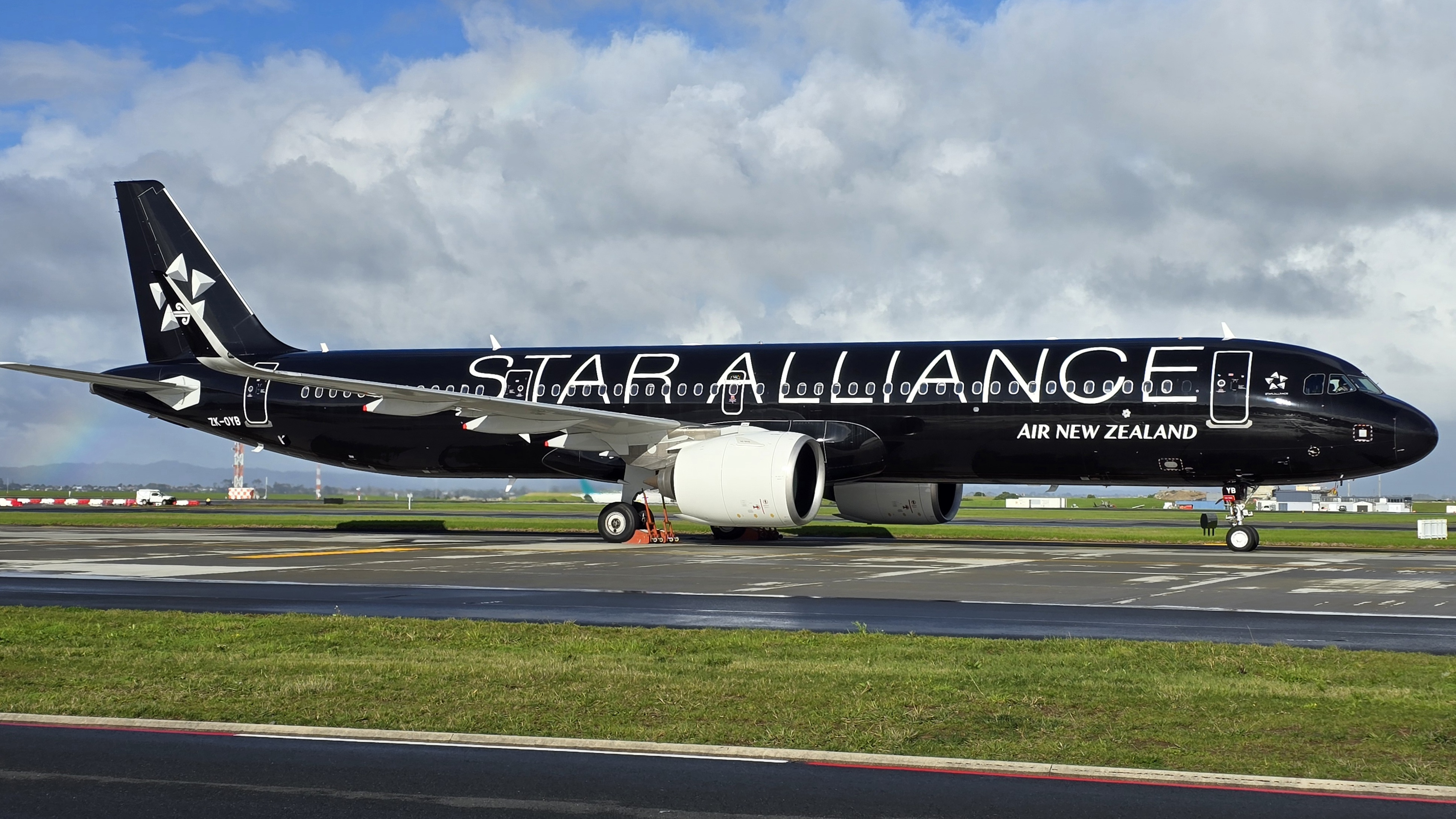
An Air New Zealand Airbus A321neo registered ZK-OYB wearing a full black Star Alliance livery

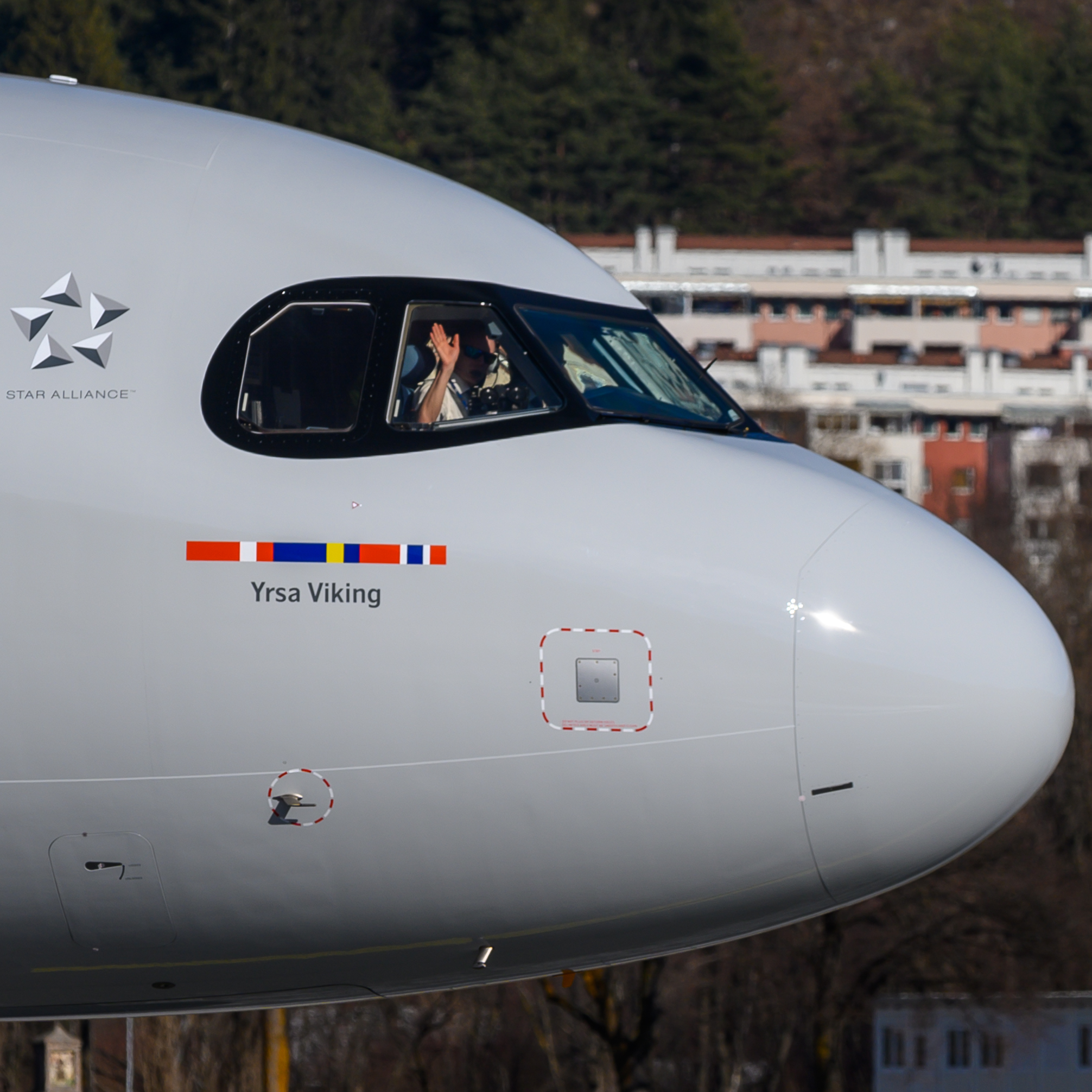
An SAS A320neo in regular livery showing the Star Alliance logo behind the cockpit windows

== Award and recognition ==
On 24 June 2024, Star Alliance was voted for two top awards by Skytrax; 2024 World's Best Airline Alliance and Best Airline Alliance Lounge.
