= Kōchi Airport =

Airport in Japan

Kōchi Airport 高知空港
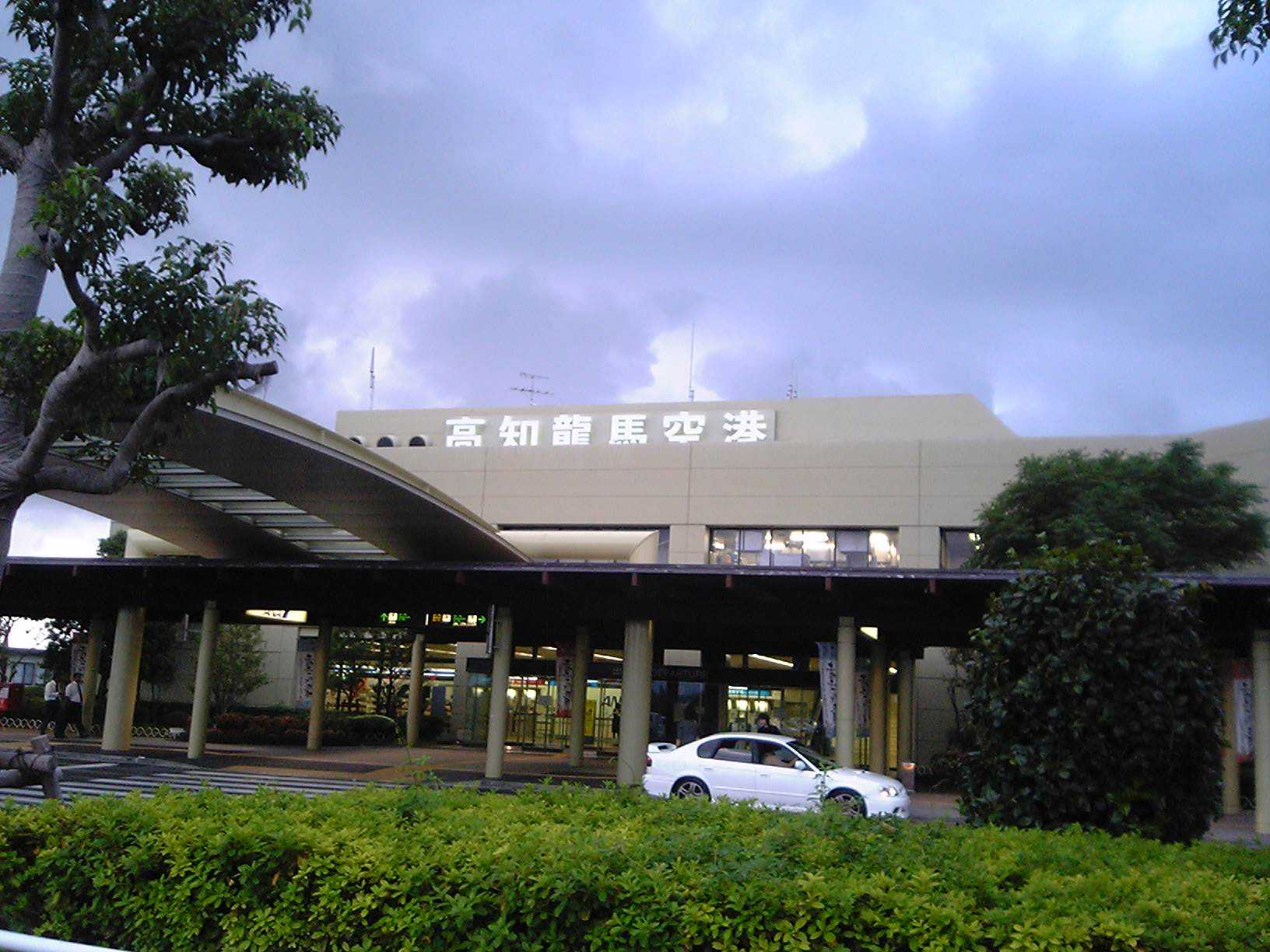
- IATA: KCZ; ICAO: RJOK

Summary
- Airport type: Public
- Owner: Government of Japan
- Operator: Kōchi Airport
- Location: Nankoku, Kochi Prefecture, Japan
- Elevation AMSL: 29 ft (8.8 m)
- Coordinates: 33°32′46″N 133°40′10″E
- Website: www.kochiap.co.jp

Map
- Location in Kōchi Prefecture Location in Japan

Runways
Direction	Length		Surface
Direction	m	ft	Surface
14/32	2,500	8,202	Asphalt

Statistics (2015)
- Passengers: 1,350,930
- Cargo (metric tonnes): 3,678
- Aircraft movement: 18,176
- Source: Japanese Ministry of Land, Infrastructure, Transport and Tourism

Kōchi Airport (高知空港, Kōchi Kūkō) (IATA: KCZ, ICAO: RJOK), also known as Kōchi Ryōma Airport (高知龍馬空港 (Kōchi Ryōma Kūkō)), is a regional airport in Nankoku, a city in Kōchi Prefecture of Japan. It is located on the southeastern coast, 7 NM (13 km; 8.1 mi) east of the city of Kōchi.

The 120 ha (297 acres) airport has a single runway handling small to medium size aircraft. The 10,900 m^{2} (117,327 sq ft) two storey terminal building is located to the north side of the runway. The arrivals level is on the first floor and departures on the second. There are 14 retail stores in the small terminal building. There is an observation deck on the third floor of the building. Transportation from the airport is by car, taxi or bus.

== History ==
Kōchi Airport was originally built in 1944 as Kōchi Airfield for the Imperial Japanese Navy and from 1945 to 1952 the airport was under command of US forces. The airfield became a civilian airport in 1952 and first flights started operating in 1954.

The runway was expanded in 1960 and 1980 and later to 2,500 metres (8,202 ft) to handle larger aircraft.

In November 2003 it became the first airport in Japan to be nicknamed after a person: Bakumatsu period leader Sakamoto Ryōma.

== Facts ==
- 6,850 long tons (6,960 t) of cargo annually (2000)
- 13,500 landings annually (2000)
- 3 gates handling 37 aircraft

== Statistics ==
- 2,400,000 passengers annually (1,932,000 in 2000)

== Airlines and destinations ==
Airlines	Destinations
All Nippon Airways	Tokyo–Haneda
ANA Wings	Osaka–Itami
Fuji Dream Airlines	Nagoya–Centrair, Nagoya–Komaki
J-Air	Fukuoka
Japan Airlines	Tokyo–Haneda
Jetstar Japan	Osaka–Kansai, Tokyo–Narita
Tigerair Taiwan	Taipei–Taoyuan

== Incidents and accidents ==
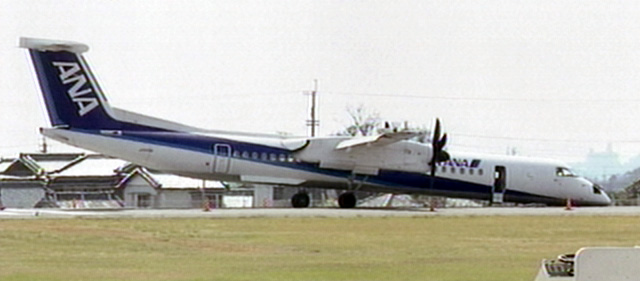
All Nippon Airways Flight 1603 plane makes a belly landing at Kōchi Airport on 13 March 2007 after the front landing gear fails to deploy.

On 13 March 2007, All Nippon Airways Flight 1603, a Bombardier Dash 8, on a flight from Osaka to Kōchi, landed safely at the Kōchi Airport after the front wheel of the plane failed to deploy. As a result, ANA's fleet of thirteen Bombardier DHC-8 aircraft were grounded for emergency inspections.
