= Shinbashi =

District of Minato, Tokyo, Japan

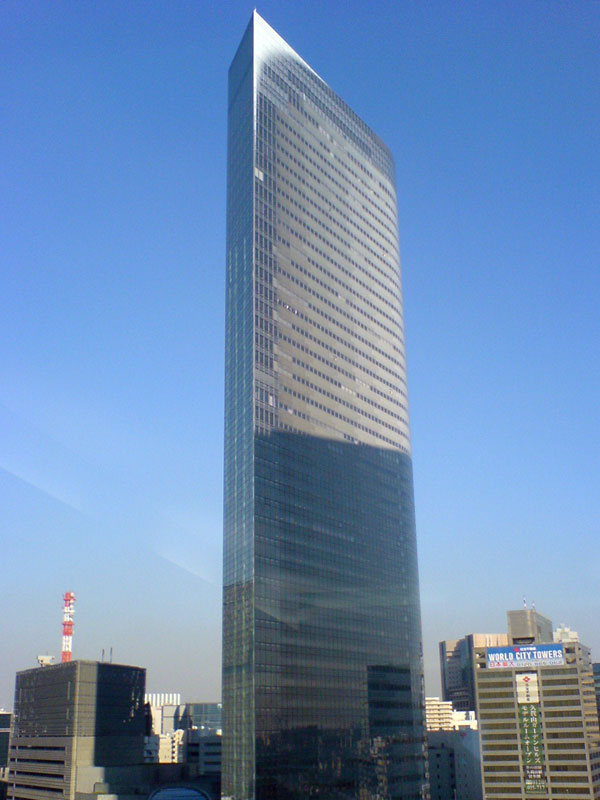
The Dentsu Building in Higashi-Shinbashi

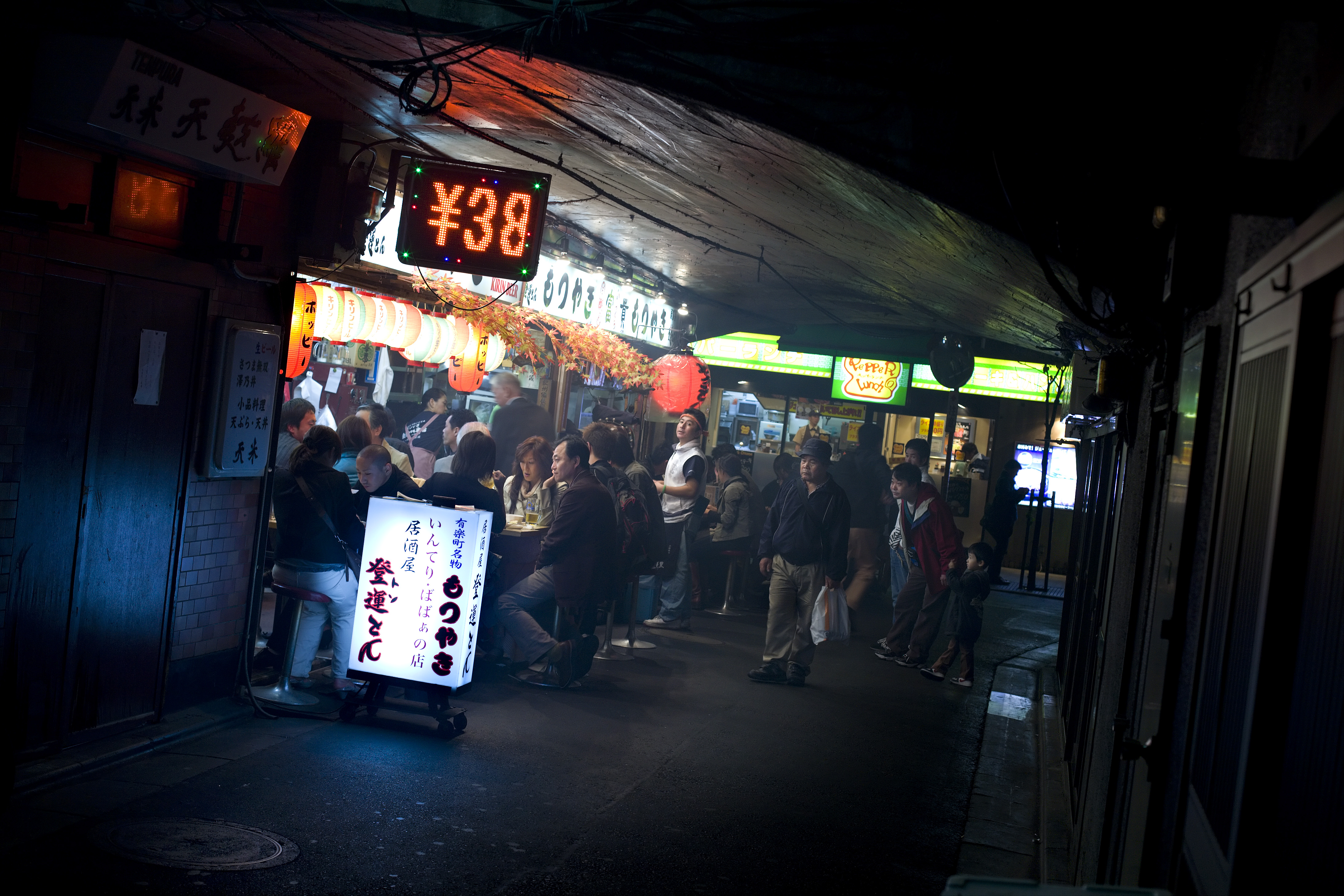
A yakitori shop under the railway tracks near Shimbashi

Shinbashi (新橋), sometimes transliterated Shimbashi, is a district of Minato, Tokyo, Japan.

== Name ==
Read literally, the characters in Shinbashi mean "new bridge".

== History ==
The area was the site of a bridge built across the Shiodome River in 1604. The river was later filled in. Shinbashi Station was the Tokyo terminus of the first railway in Japan in 1872. It remains a major railway hub and has since developed into a commercial center, most recently with the construction of the Shiodome "Shiosite" high-rise office complex.

== Places in Shinbashi ==
- Reconstructed Shimbashi Station, which now houses a museum and restaurant.
- Shiodome Shiosite high-rise commercial complex.

== Economy ==
The Shiodome City Center building in Shiodome includes the corporate headquarters and public and investor relations offices of Fujitsu, the headquarters of All Nippon Airways, and the headquarters of ANA subsidiaries Air Nippon and ANA & JP Express. In addition ANA subsidiary Air Japan has some offices in Shiodome City Center. In the late 1960s All Nippon Airways had its headquarters in the Hikokan Building in Shinbashi.

Other companies in Shinbashi include:

- Dentsu
- Kyodo News
- Nippon Television
- Nittsu
- Panasonic Electric Works (Tokyo head office)
- Shiseido
- Softbank
- Yakult

== Train stations ==
- Shimbashi Station (Ginza Line, Keihin-Tohoku Line, Toei Asakusa Line, Yamanote Line, Yokosuka Line, Yurikamome)
- Shiodome Station (Toei Oedo Line, Yurikamome)

== Education ==
Minato City Board of Education operates public elementary and junior high schools.

Shinbashi 1-6-chōme is zoned to Onarimon Elementary School (御成門小学校) and Onarimon Junior High School (御成門中学校).
