= AJV (disambiguation) =

AJV may refer to:

- ANA & JP Express (ICAO airline code AJV), Japanese cargo airline
- Advance Aviation Jet (ICAO airline code AJV), Thai air charter
- Volkswagen AJV, a discontinued VW petrol engine
- Arbeitsgemeinschaft von Jugendbuchverlagen (ajv; German: association of youth book publishers)
