= FamilyMart =

Japanese multinational convenience store chain

FamilyMart Co., Ltd.

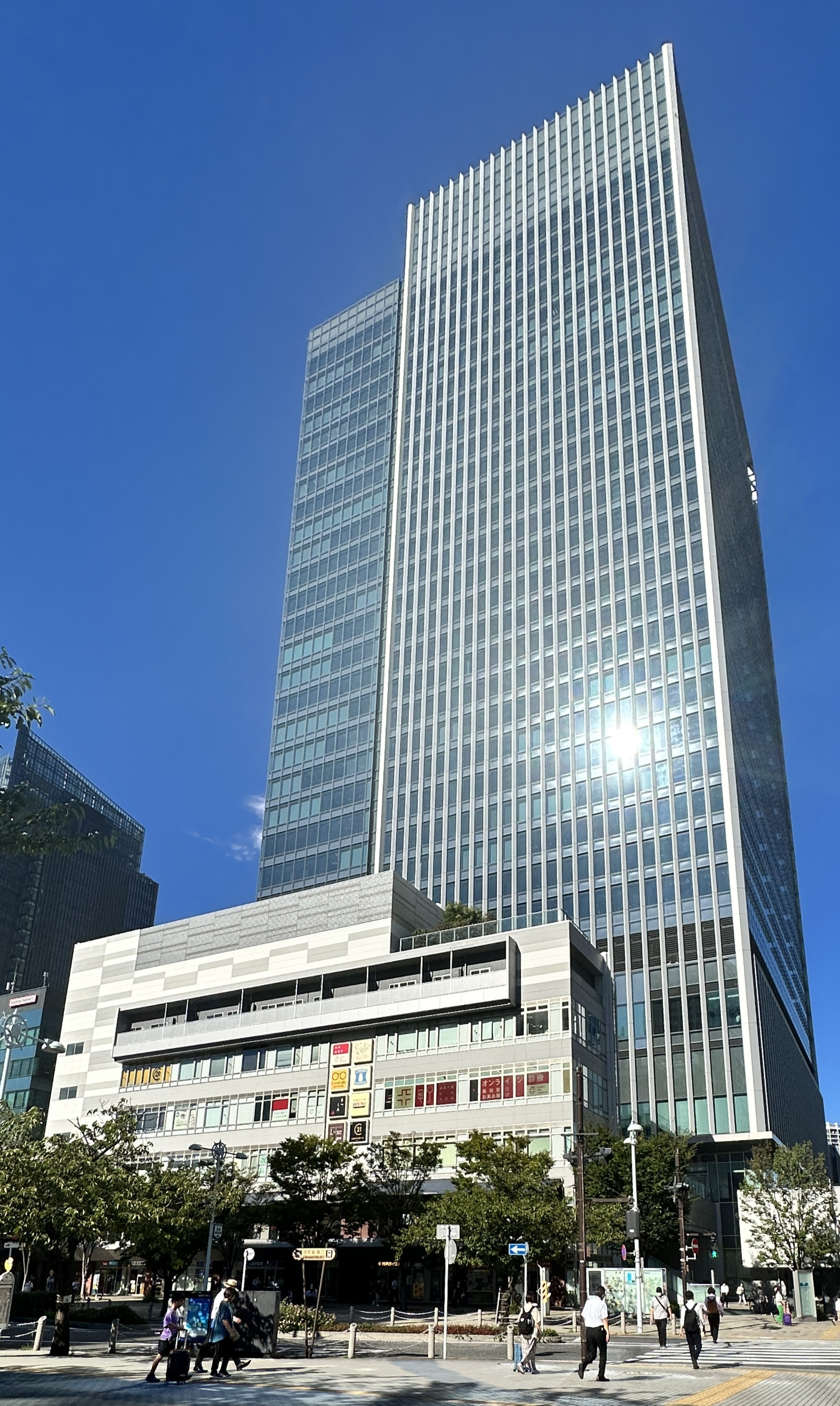
- FamilyMart's headquarters in Shibaura, Tokyo
- Native name: 株式会社ファミリーマート
- Romanized name: Kabushiki gaisha FamirīMāto
- Formerly: Jonas Co., Ltd. (1948-1981)
- Type: Subsidiary
- Industry: Convenience stores
- Founded: August 19, 1948; 78 years ago (company); 1973; 53 years ago (brand)
- Founder: Seibu Retailing Group
- Headquarters: Tamachi Station Tower S, Shibaura, Minato, Tokyo, Japan
- Number of locations: 24,941 (July 2021)
- Areas served: Japan; Taiwan; China mainland Vietnam; Indonesia; Malaysia
- Key people: Koji Takayanagi (Director and chairman); Kensuke Hosomi (Representative Director and president)
- Products: Onigiri (rice balls); Hot snacks; Refrigerated meals; Oden (stew); Coffee and frappe beverages
- Revenue: JPY 477.5 bn (2017)
- Operating income: JPY 42.8 bn (2017)
- Net income: JPY 21.9 bn (2017)
- Total assets: JPY 730.3 bn (2016)
- Total equity: JPY 295.2 bn (2016)
- Number of employees: 16,601 (2017)
- Parent: Seibu Retailing Group (1973–2006); FamilyMart UNY Holdings Co., Ltd. (2017–2020); Itochu (2020–present)
- Subsidiaries: Famima!!
- Website: www.family.co.jp

FamilyMart Company, Ltd. (Japanese: 株式会社ファミリーマート, Hepburn: Kabushikigaisha Famirīmāto) is a Japanese convenience store franchise chain, and a subsidiary of Itochu, a Japanese trading company. It is Japan's second largest convenience store chain, behind Seven-Eleven Japan. FamilyMart currently has 24,574 franchise stores worldwide in Japan, Malaysia, Taiwan, China, Philippines, Vietnam, and Indonesia. Its headquarters is on the 17th floor of the Sunshine 60 building in Ikebukuro, Toshima, Tokyo. There were some stores in Japan with the name Circle K Sunkus under the operation of FamilyMart.

FamilyMart stores sell typical Japanese convenience store goods, including basic grocery items, magazines, manga, soft drinks, alcoholic drinks like sake, nikuman (steamed pork buns), fried chicken, onigiri/omusubi (rice balls), and bento. FamilyMart is known for its distinctive doorbell melody, which plays upon entering the store. The doorbells are exclusively made by Panasonic. The melody is referred to as Melody Chime No. 1 – Daiseikyou, and was originally developed for Panasonic by Yasuhi Inada in 1978.

== History ==
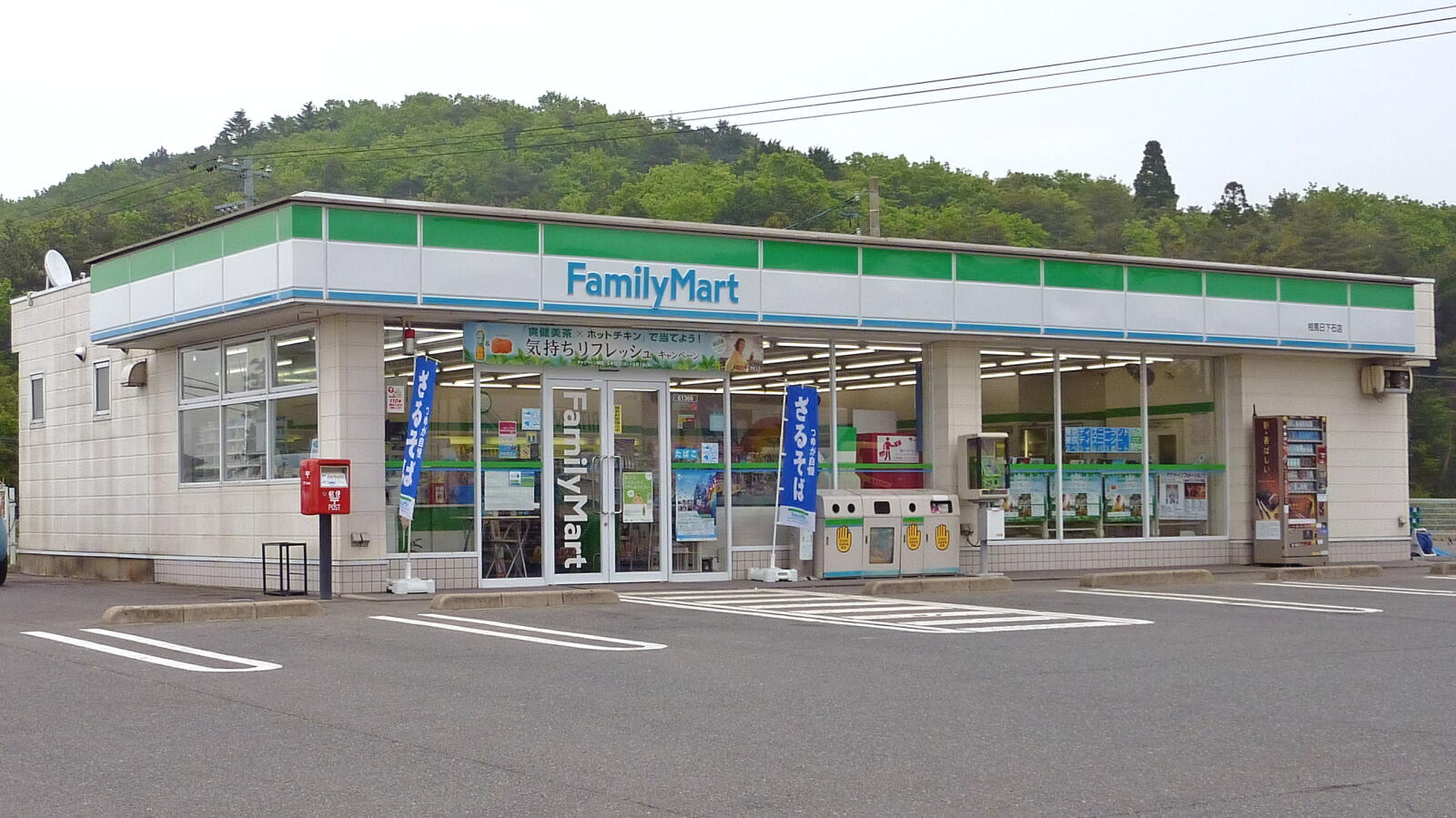
FamilyMart store in Sōma, Fukushima, Japan

The first FamilyMart opened in Sayama, Saitama Prefecture, in 1973. In 2002, it was listed as a company in Taiwan.

In October 2013, FamilyMart opened its 10,000th store in Japan. Operations in certain parts of Asia, especially China, continue to expand. FamilyMart also operated stores in South Korea from 1990 until 2014, when FamilyMart sold its stake in BGF Retail and divested from South Korea.

As of January 2018, there were 24,243 stores worldwide; 17,409 stores in Japan, 3,165 stores in Taiwan, 2,177 stores in China, 1,138 stores in Thailand, 277 stores in Malaysia, 165 stores in Vietnam, 87 stores in Indonesia, and 66 stores in the Philippines.

FamilyMart was a subsidiary of the FamilyMart UNY Holdings Co., Ltd. (UFHD), which also owned supermarket chain UNY, until 2020. UFHD was dissolved when Uny was acquired by the parent company of Don Quijote in 2020.

FamilyMart Co.'s parent company is Itochu, a Japanese trading company, with a stake of 50.1%. On July 8, 2020, Itochu announced it would spend approximately ¥580 billion (approx US$5.5 billion) to purchase 100% of FamilyMart, with the intent to sell 4.9% of the shares to Zen-Noh and Norinchukin Bank. FamilyMart shareholders approved the takeover on October 26, and the stock was delisted on November 12, thus leading the completion of the acquisition.

=== International operations ===
==== Mainland China ====
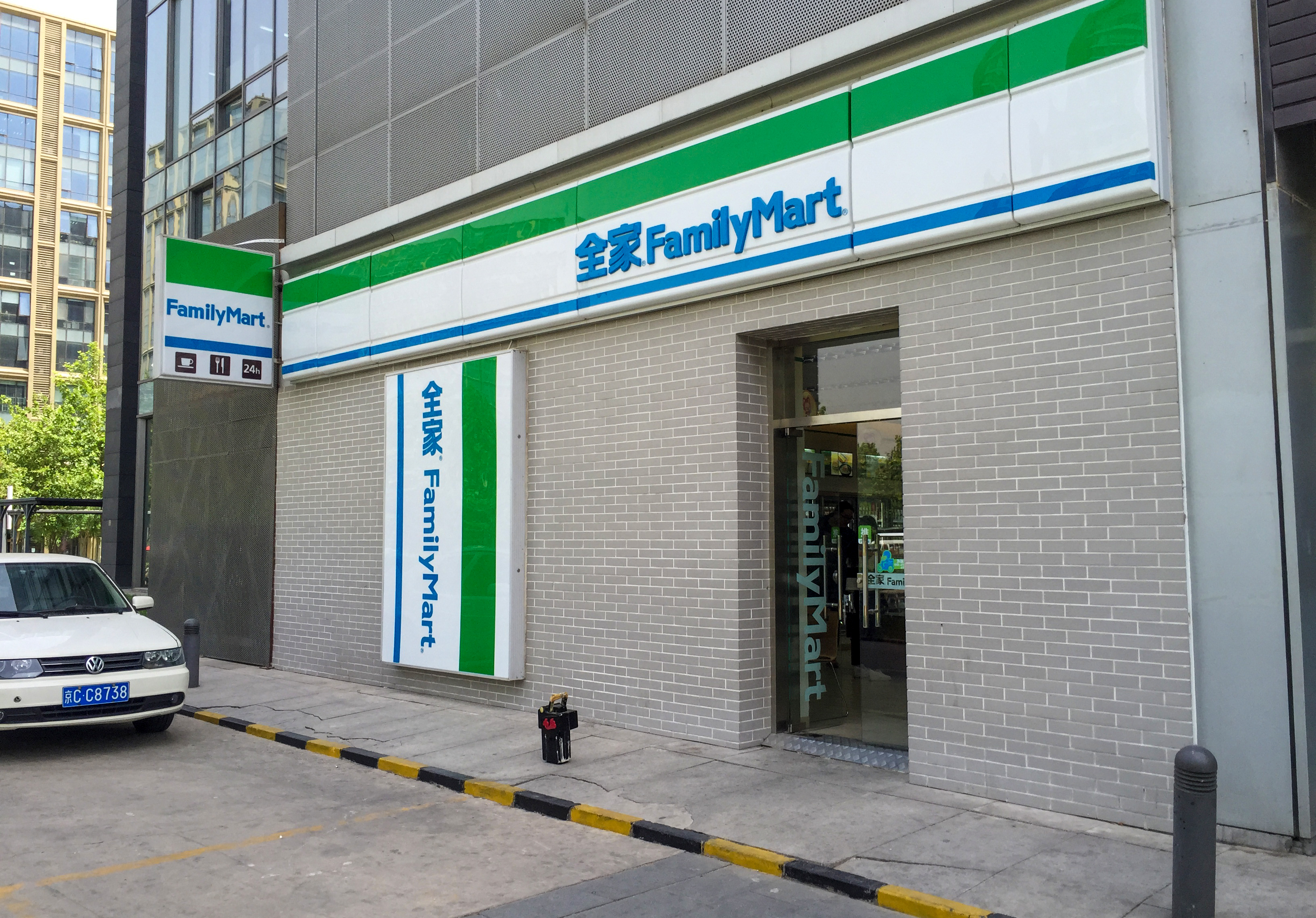
A FamilyMart store in Beijing, China

FamilyMart opened its first store in Shanghai, China, in 2004. Since then, the chain has expanded to Guangzhou, Suzhou and Hangzhou. Other stores are in Shenzhen, Guangzhou, Chengdu, Wuxi, Beijing and Dongguan. By December 2020, there are over 2,967 FamilyMart stores in mainland China.

==== Indonesia ====
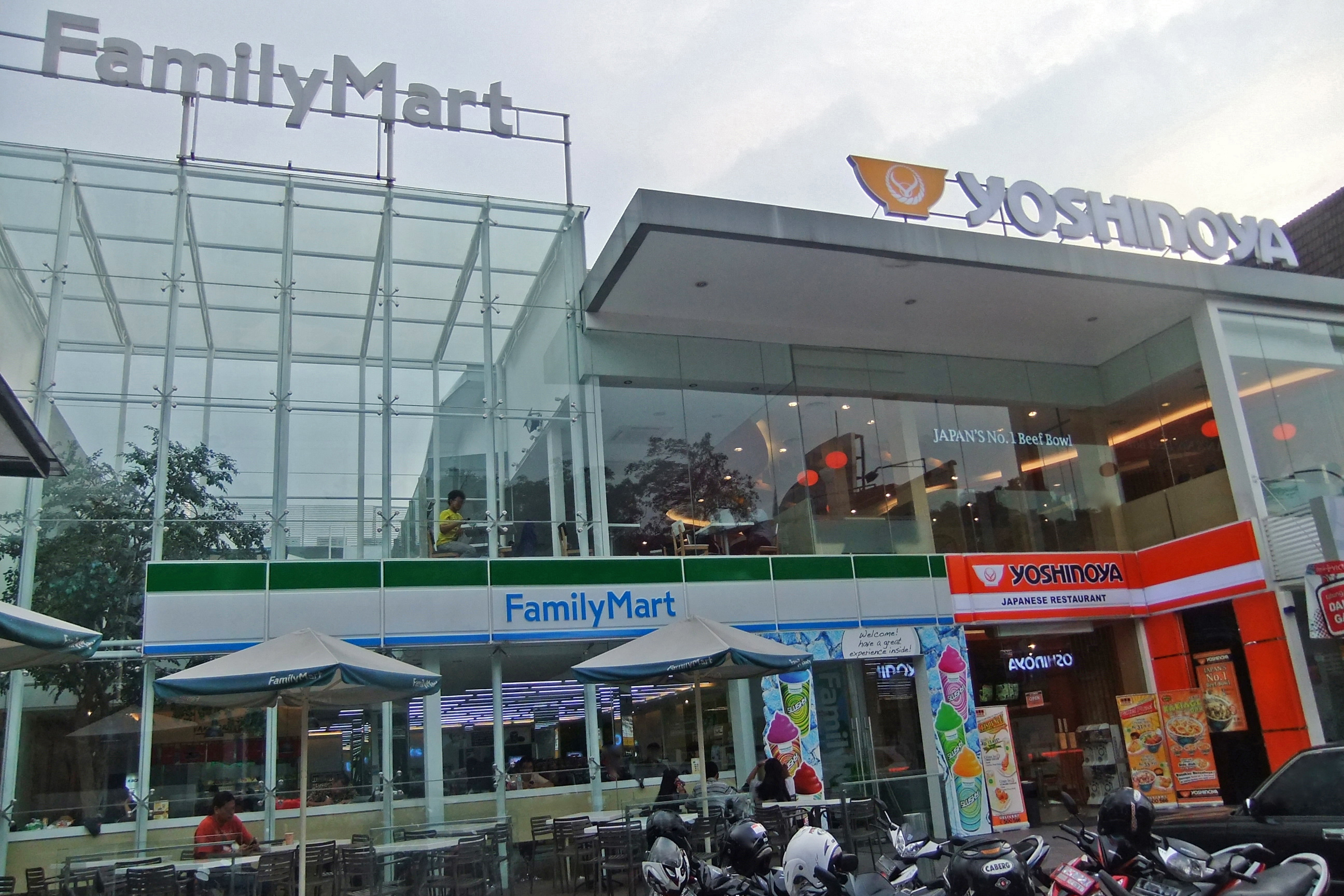
A FamilyMart store (left) in South Jakarta, Jakarta

In 2012, FamilyMart planned to open 300 outlets in each Southeast Asian countries. They officially entered the Indonesian market in 2012 through a joint venture with PT Fajar Mitra Indah, which is a subsidiary of the Wings Group, one of the major Indonesian company. The first FamilyMart store in Indonesia opened on 16 October 2012 in Cibubur, followed by a second outlet on Jalan Bulungan, South Jakarta on 17 November 2012. Additional stores were subsequently launched in Pejaten (South Jakarta), Kelapa Gading (North Jakarta), and Thamrin Residence Apartment (Central Jakarta).

By 31 March 2013, FamilyMart had established six outlets in Jakarta. In a major expansion move, PT Fajar Mitra Indah acquired 57 Starmart stores in early 2016 for Rp50 billion, after Starmart reported a net loss of Rp144 billion and closed 51 stores in 2015. The remaining 27 unsold Starmart stores were shut down.

As of June 2024, FamilyMart operated more than 270 outlets, primarily concentrated in the Greater Jakarta area (Jabodetabek). By 2025, FamilyMart had expanded its footprint into more cities throughout Java Island, notably Surabaya, Malang and Bali.

==== Malaysia ====
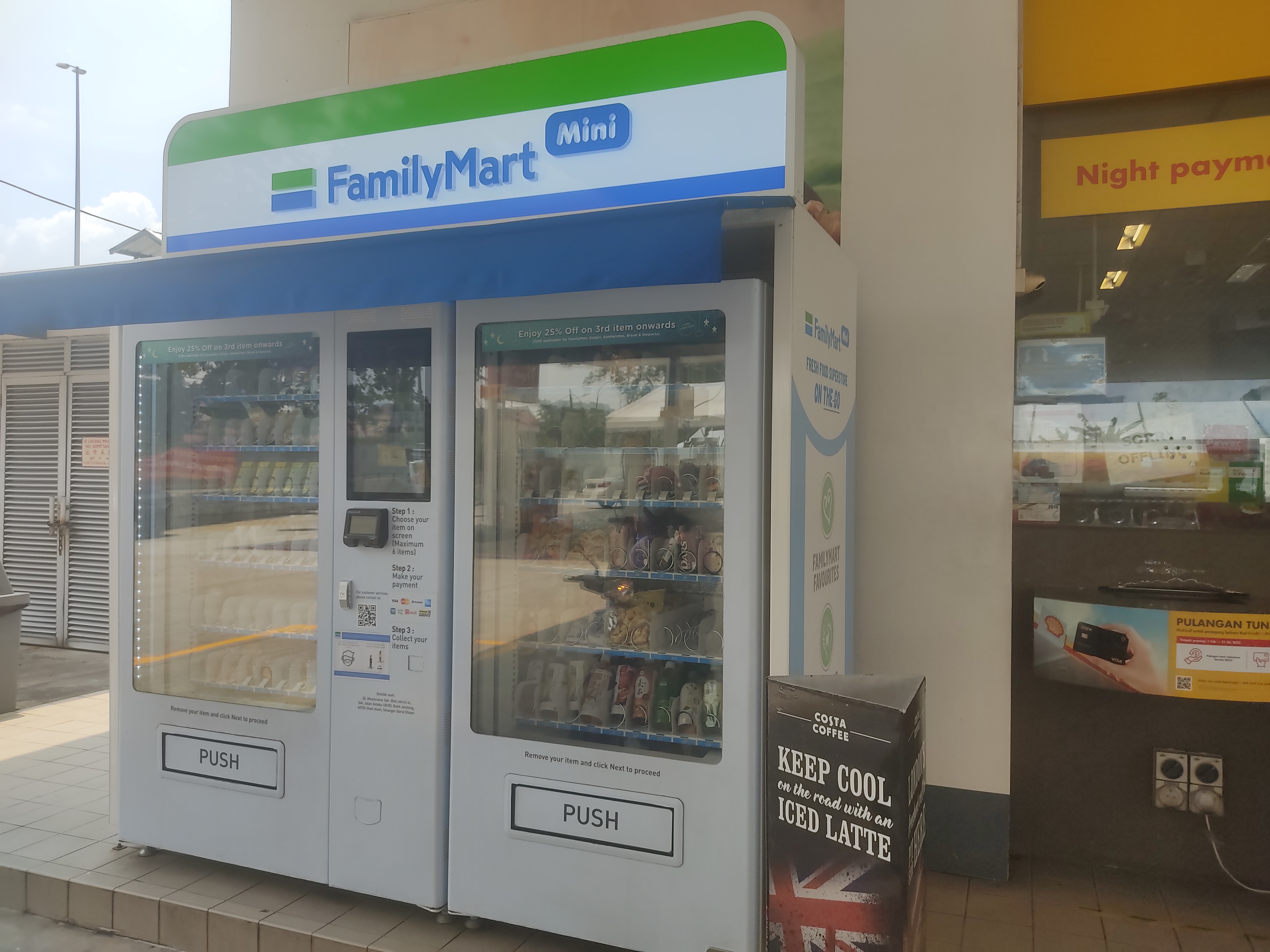
A FamilyMart Mini vending machine in Shell Jalan Tun Razak, Kuala Lumpur

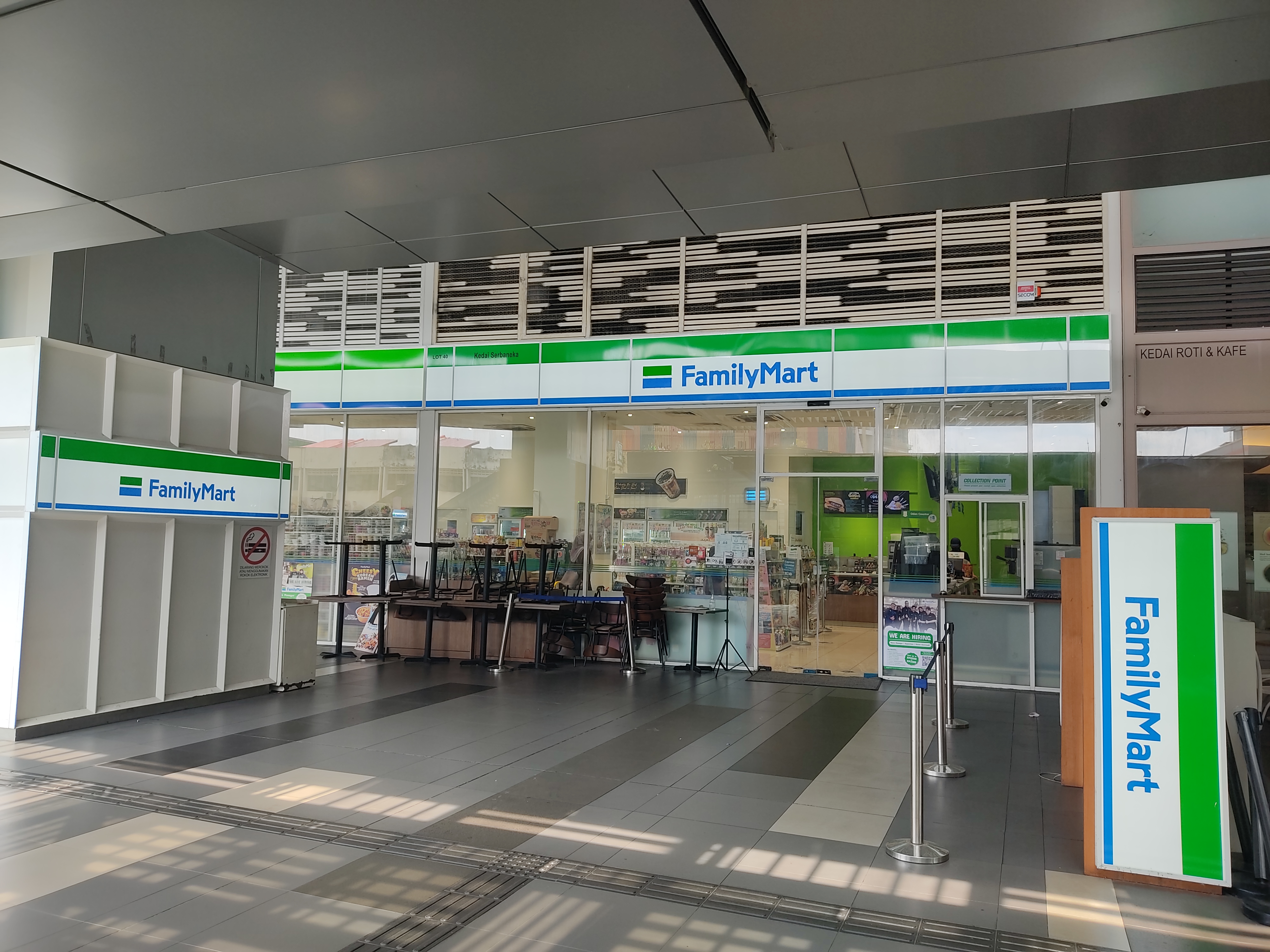
A FamilyMart store in Nu Sentral (KL Sentral), Kuala Lumpur

FamilyMart opened its first store in Malaysia at Wisma Lim Foo Yong in Bukit Bintang, Kuala Lumpur on November 11, 2016. It has become popular because it is the first convenience store selling soft serve ice cream and fresh snacks.

FamilyMart Malaysia are owned by Maxincome Resources Sdn Bhd which is one of QL Resources Bhd subsidiary. They had a 20-year agreement with FamilyMart Co Ltd.

All of FamilyMart Malaysia's food service and ready-to-eat selections are made with halal ingredients only. The service is currently in the midst of the halal application process with JAKIM. The products available in FamilyMart that are Halal certified will carry the Halal logo on its packaging. For products that are imported from Japan, Korea or Taiwan, the product ingredients will be vetted to ensure that no haram ingredients such as pork, lard or alcoholic substance were used. Customers will be able to read the ingredients information on the food or drinks packaging before purchase to ensure hassle-free consuming. In April 2019, FamilyMart Malaysia was one of the F&B outlets that was chosen by PLUS Malaysia Berhad, the largest expressway in Malaysia to set up their stores in one of the R&R areas.

As of May 6, 2021, there are 242 stores nationwide, marking the 200th store milestone on the first store in Penang after its 100th store in Malacca. By 2022, they planned to open 300 stores nationwide.

==== Taiwan ====
In 1988, FamilyMart began opening stores in Taiwan. As of October 2021, FamilyMart has over 3,600 stores in Taiwan. FamilyMart provides banking and bill payment services and as of 2018, FamilyMart accepts the highest number of bill payments among convenience stores in Taiwan, with over 100 million bills paid per year.

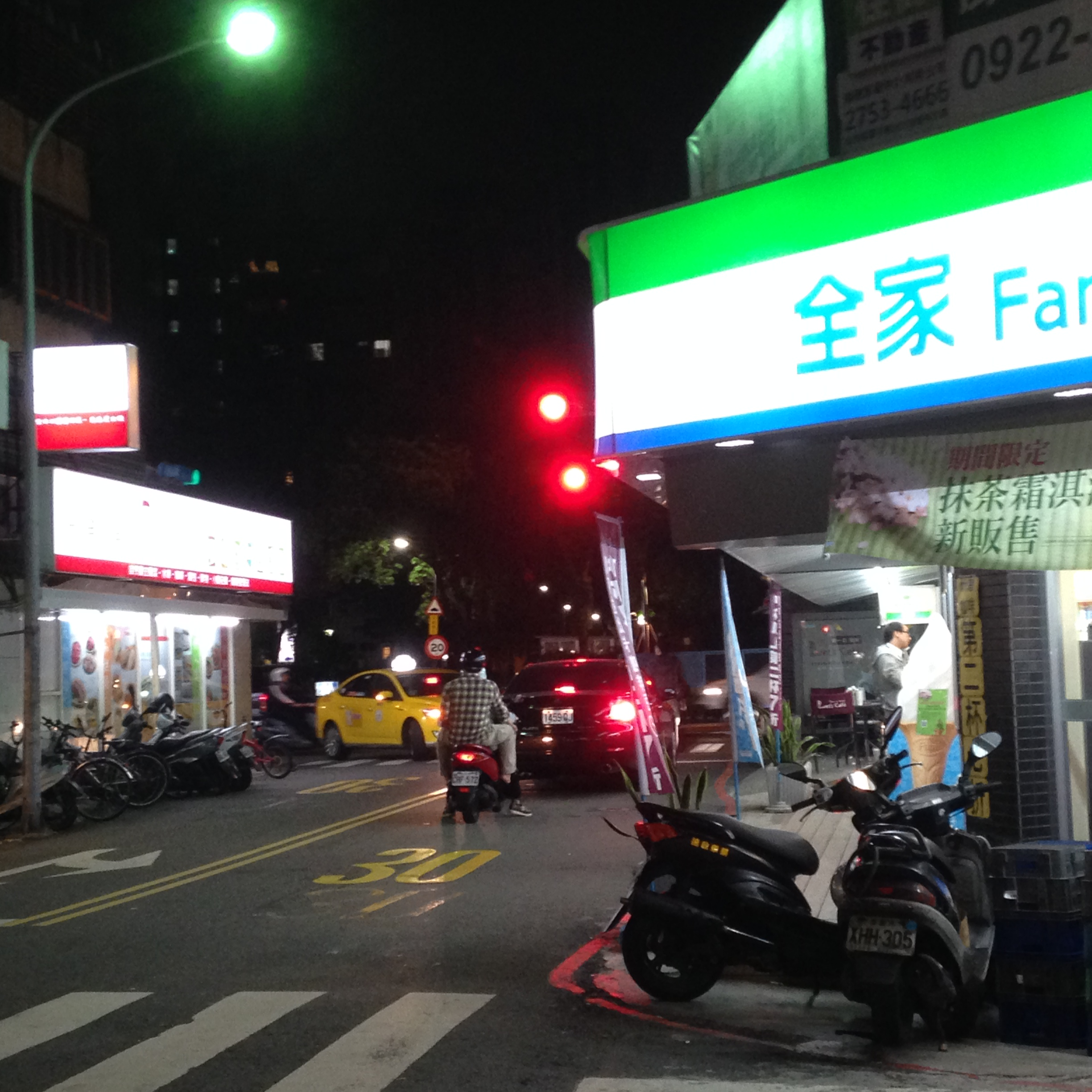
A Taiwan FamilyMart is on the right, while another convenience store is right across the street.

FamilyMart sued to end its partnership with Ting Hsin in 2019, which would end a 15-year joint venture.

==== Vietnam ====
FamilyMart opened its first store in Vietnam in 2009, starting in Ho Chi Minh City. Initially the stores were operated in a joint venture with Vietnamese distributor Phu Thai Group, after 2013, both companies went their own way, and Phu Thai Group took over a number of FamilyMart stores and started operating them under its own brand B's Mart. As of 2017, FamilyMart operated 130 stores in Ho Chi Minh City.

=== Former ===
==== Korea ====
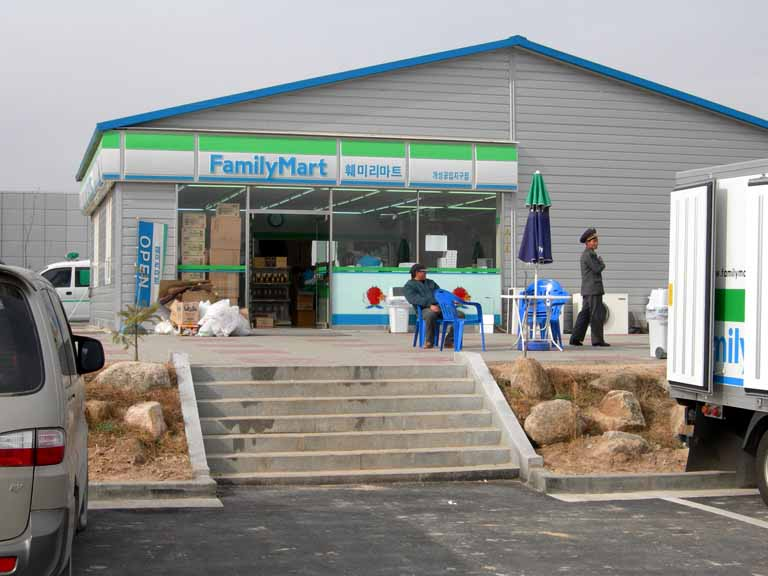
FamilyMart in Kaesong Industrial Region. North Koreans are prohibited from using the convenience store, which was set up for the use of South Korean workers. South Korean currency is not accepted.

At the end of May 2012, the number of operating FamilyMart stores had reached 7,271. In June 2012, FamilyMart of South Korea, which was being run by FamilyMart Corporation and BGF Retail, was renamed and converted to "CU" (short for "Convenience for You") under ownership of BGF Retail after an order coming from BGF Retail that required FamilyMart to leave the South Korean market, and to cease operations there. At the end of March 2014, FamilyMart withdrew from the South Korean market completely.

In addition, South Korean franchisees had operated a number of stores at Kaesong Industrial Region and Mount Kumgang Tourist Region in North Korea for South Korean visitors and workers; all the stores are now closed.

==== Thailand ====
FamilyMart opened its first store in 1993 and grew to over 1,000 locations within the next decades. In May 2020, FamilyMart transferred their 49% stake of the Thai joint venture to partner Central Group. Despite FamilyMart's effective exit from the venture, they maintained licensing rights and store locations retained the company's name. Their franchise agreement with Central ended in 2023, and FamilyMart exited Thailand as its roughly 200 remaining stores in the country were to be converted to Central's Tops Daily brand.

==== United States ====
Beginning in July 2005, FamilyMart began building and opening several stores in Los Angeles, California, under the name Famima!!. After freezing the number of locations at 10 in 2010, FamilyMart closed all eight of its Famima!! convenience stores in the United States and liquidated Famima Corp. USA, withdrawing from the United States in October 2015.

==== Philippines ====
FamilyMart was launched in the Philippines on April 7, 2013 under the ownership of Ayala Corporation, Rustan's Group and Itochu. Philippine FamilyMart CVS Inc. is the official Philippine franchisee of FamilyMart. Its first Philippine branch, opened on April 22, 2013, is located at the Glorietta 3 mall in Makati. In 2017, Phoenix Petroleum Philippines, Inc., a unit of the Davao-based conglomerate Udenna Corporation, acquired the franchise from the triumvirate; it was completed in 2018. There were more than 65 stores in the Philippines, including those built at select Phoenix Petroleum stations.

On November 21, 2019, FamilyMart opened its largest outlet in the world, with an area of 390 square meters (4,200 sq ft), at Udenna Tower in Bonifacio Global City, Taguig.

However, several FamilyMart stores in the Philippines have closed since 2022, including the world's largest outlet, due to financial challenges faced by Udenna Corporation founder and owner Dennis Uy. By 2022, Phoenix reported a ₱191.1 million impairment loss on its investment. Reports in 2023 attributed such closures to debts and unpaid obligations. Around 2025, all FamilyMart stores in the Philippines had closed and the final branch in Lanang, Davao City, was renamed Nest Mart.

== Solar power ==
FamilyMart has had solar power at some of its stores since at least 2004. It aims to increase its solar energy footprint in the future. There are around 45,000 convenience stores in Japan. Lawson run just under 10,000, a market share just behind 7-Eleven, who have about 13,000 stores. Currently, only 20 of Lawson's stores are equipped with solar equipment, but they plan to expand that number ahead of the July 1, 2012 introduction of a "feed-in tariff system", which the government and electricity companies say guarantees purchases of electricity from renewable sources such as solar or wind generators. Surplus power can be sold only after in-store lighting and air-conditioning have been powered.

== Automatic cashiers ==
On 30 January 2006, FamilyMart began trials of an automatic cashier station at one of its Tokyo stores in cooperation with Itochu and Toshiba. Special tags on items in the customer's shopping basket are remotely and instantly sensed at the register.

== Controversies ==
=== Labor Commission case by franchise owners ===
Seventeen convenience store owners of FamilyMart stores formed a union and requested collective bargaining with the company. They were refused and sued. In April 2015 the Central Labor Commission of Japan found that FamilyMart had violated the Trade Union Law by refusing to negotiate with the union. The franchise owners were recognized as employees under the trade union law, and the company was ordered to pledge to the union that it would not repeat the offence.

=== Rat infestation incident ===
In August 2019, footage emerged of as many as six rats scurrying through a FamilyMart store in Shibuya, near sushi displays and down aisles. FamilyMart responded by shutting the store, in order to investigate the cause of the problem, and apologised if the "unsanitary" footage had made customers feel "uneasy".

== See also ==
- List of convenience stores
