= Air Nippon Airways =

Air Nippon Airways may refer to:

- Air Nippon
- A mistaken way of saying All Nippon Airways
