= Shiodome City Center =

Skyscraper in Tokyo

Coordinates: 35°39′55″N 139°45′40″E

- Shiodome Shiti Sentā (汐留シティセンター)

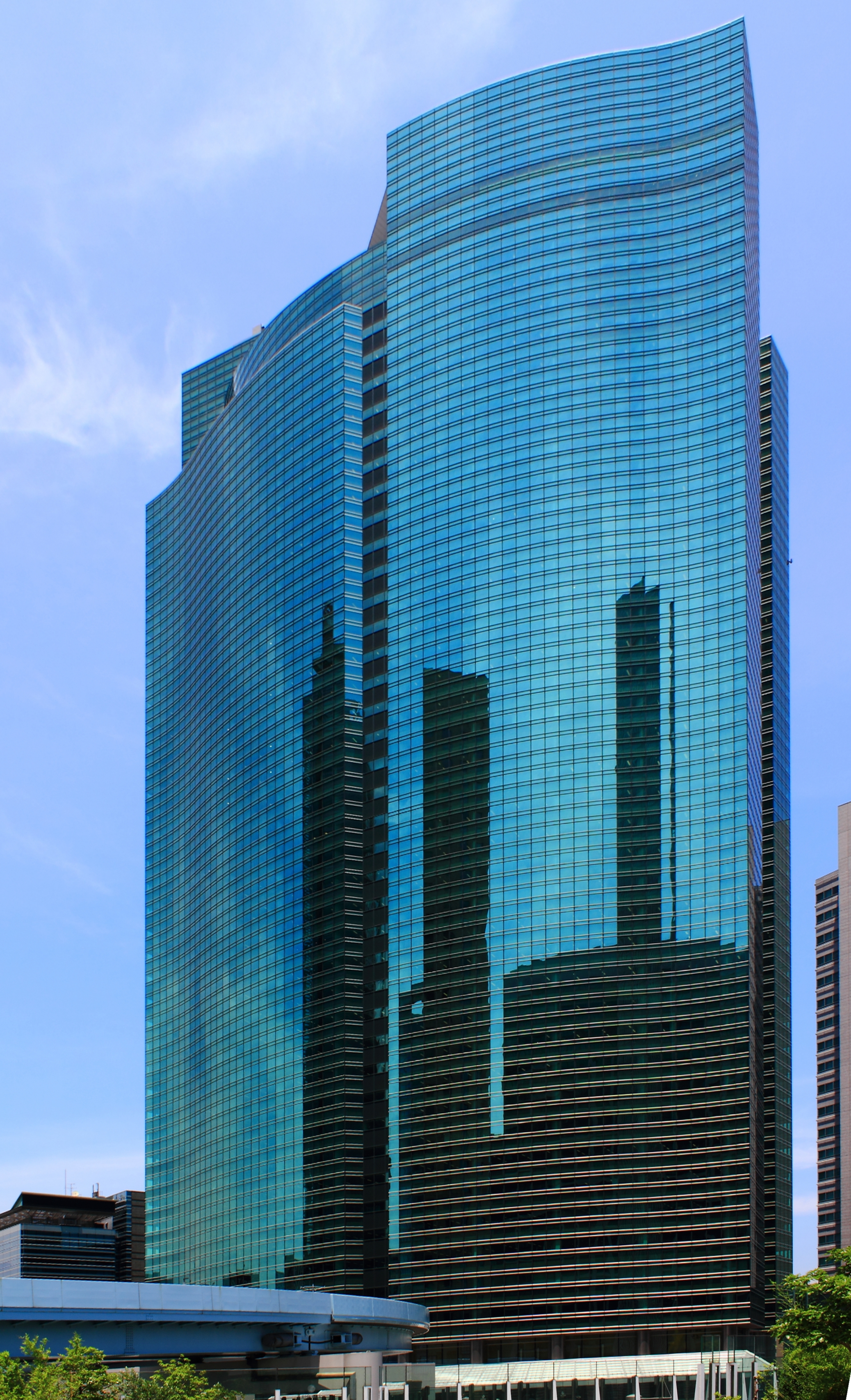
- Alternative names: AM Tower

General information
- Type: Office skyscraper
- Location: Minato, Tokyo, Japan
- Opening: 14 April 2003

Height
- Height: 215.8 metres (708 ft)

Technical details
- Floor count: 43

Website
- Shiodome City Center Official Website

Shiodome City Center (汐留シティセンター, Shiodome Shiti Sentā) is a 216 m (708 ft), 43-story skyscraper in the Shiodome area of Minato, Tokyo, Japan, managed by Mitsui Fudosan and Alderney Investments Pte Ltd., a subsidiary of the Singaporean sovereign wealth fund GIC Private Limited. Opened in 2003, it has a 1200% floor area ratio.

== History ==
In 2002 All Nippon Airways (ANA) announced that it would be taking up to ten floors in the then under-construction Shiodome City Center. It was planning on moving its headquarters from Tokyo International Airport. ANA announced that it was also moving some subsidiaries to the Shiodome City Center. When Shiodome City Center opened, Nippon Cargo Airlines moved its headquarters into the facility. The airline had its headquarters and its East Japan sales office on the 8th floor.

Bloomberg reported in 2023 that GIC was considering a sale of the building.

== Tenants ==
=== Office ===
Fujitsu's worldwide headquarters are in Shiodome City Center. The airline All Nippon Airways maintains its headquarters and a ticketing office at the building. The subsidiaries Air Nippon, ANA & JP Express, and All Nippon Airways Trading are headquartered in the building. Air Japan, an ANA subsidiary, has some offices in Shiodome City Center. Mitsui Chemicals has its headquarters in Shiodome City Center. Vanilla Air, when it was known as AirAsia Japan, was headquartered here.

=== Retail ===
- Aigan
- Famima!!
- Godiva Chocolatier
- Libro
- Porsche Center Ginza
- Subway
- Tomod's
- Vie de France

== Transportation ==
The building is close to the Shimbashi Station of the Tokyo Metro Ginza Line and Toei Asakusa Line, and the Shiodome Station of the Toei Ōedo Line and Yurikamome.

== Gallery ==
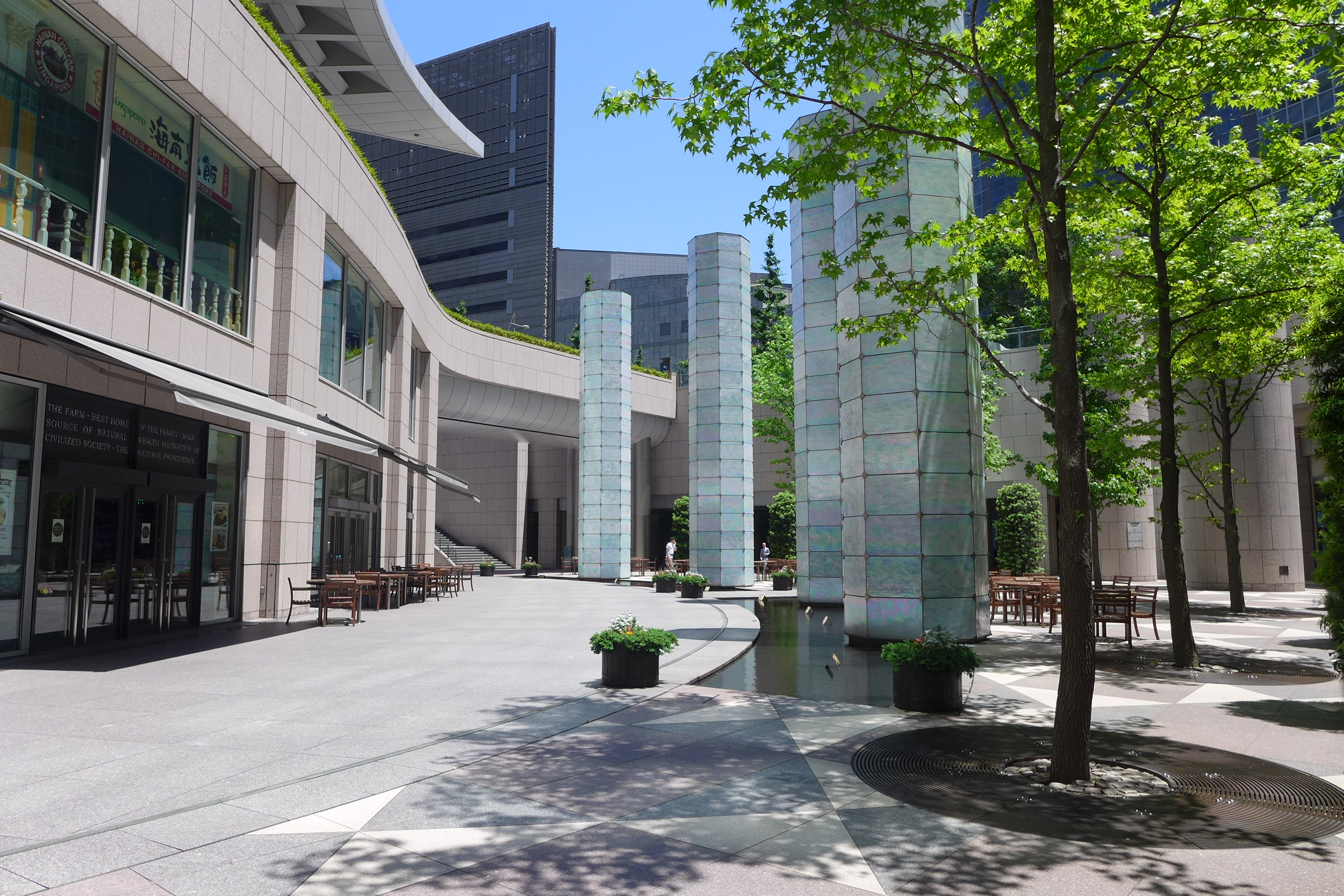
Shiodome City Center underground

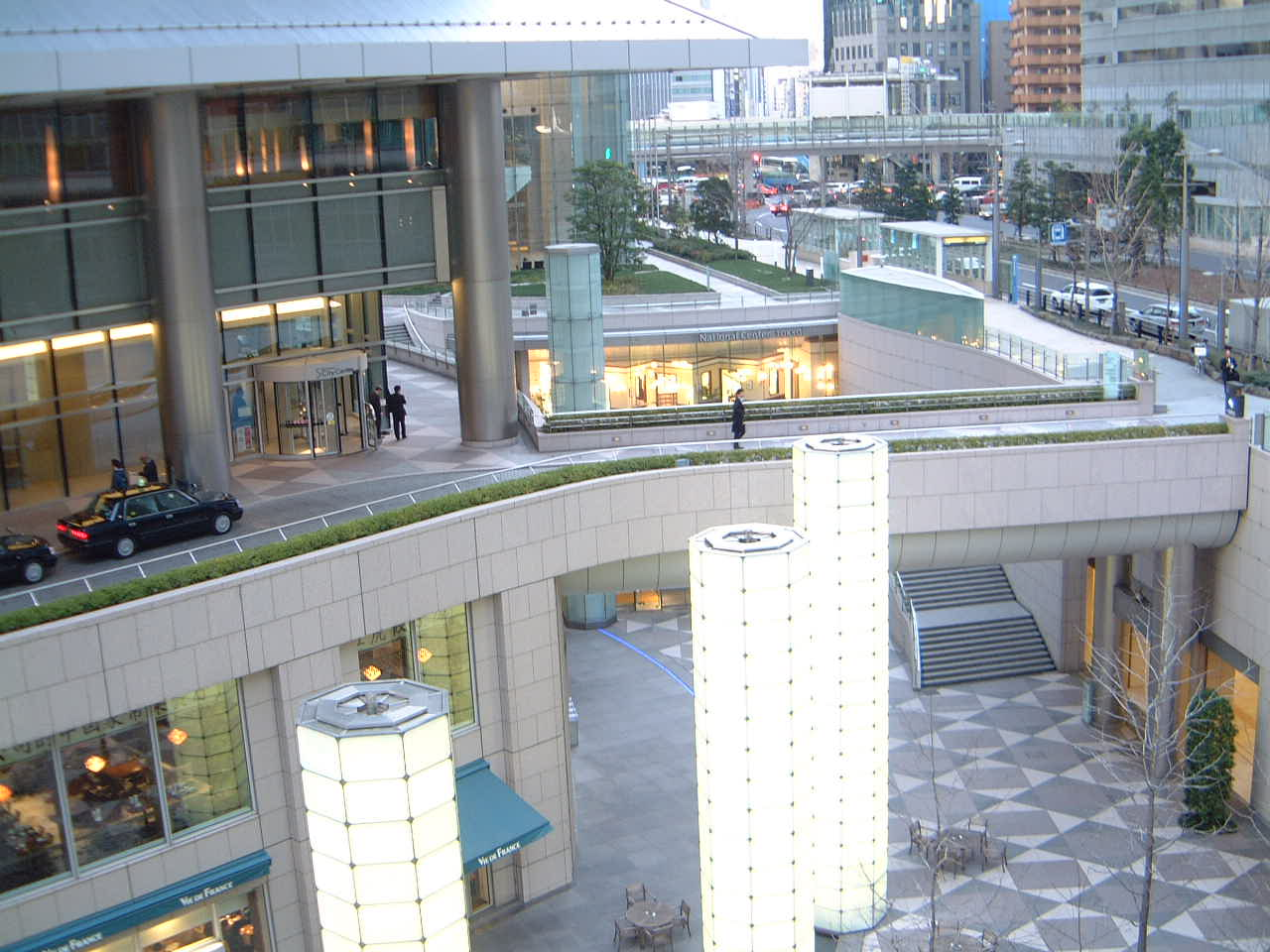
Shiodome City Center underground

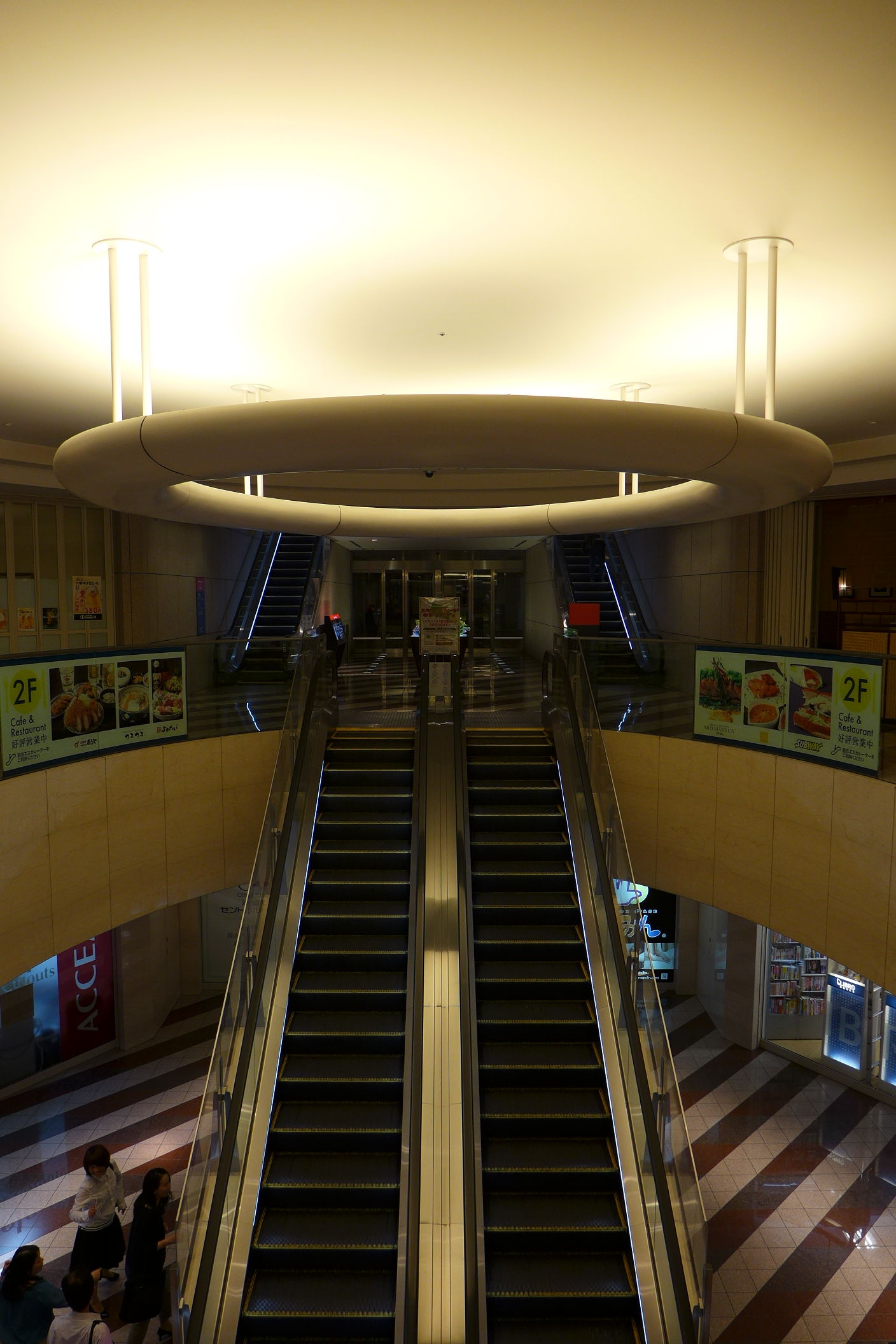
Shiodome City Center Shopping Arcade
