= Circle K Sunkus =

Defunct group of Circle K and Sunkus stores

Circle K Sunkus Co., Ltd
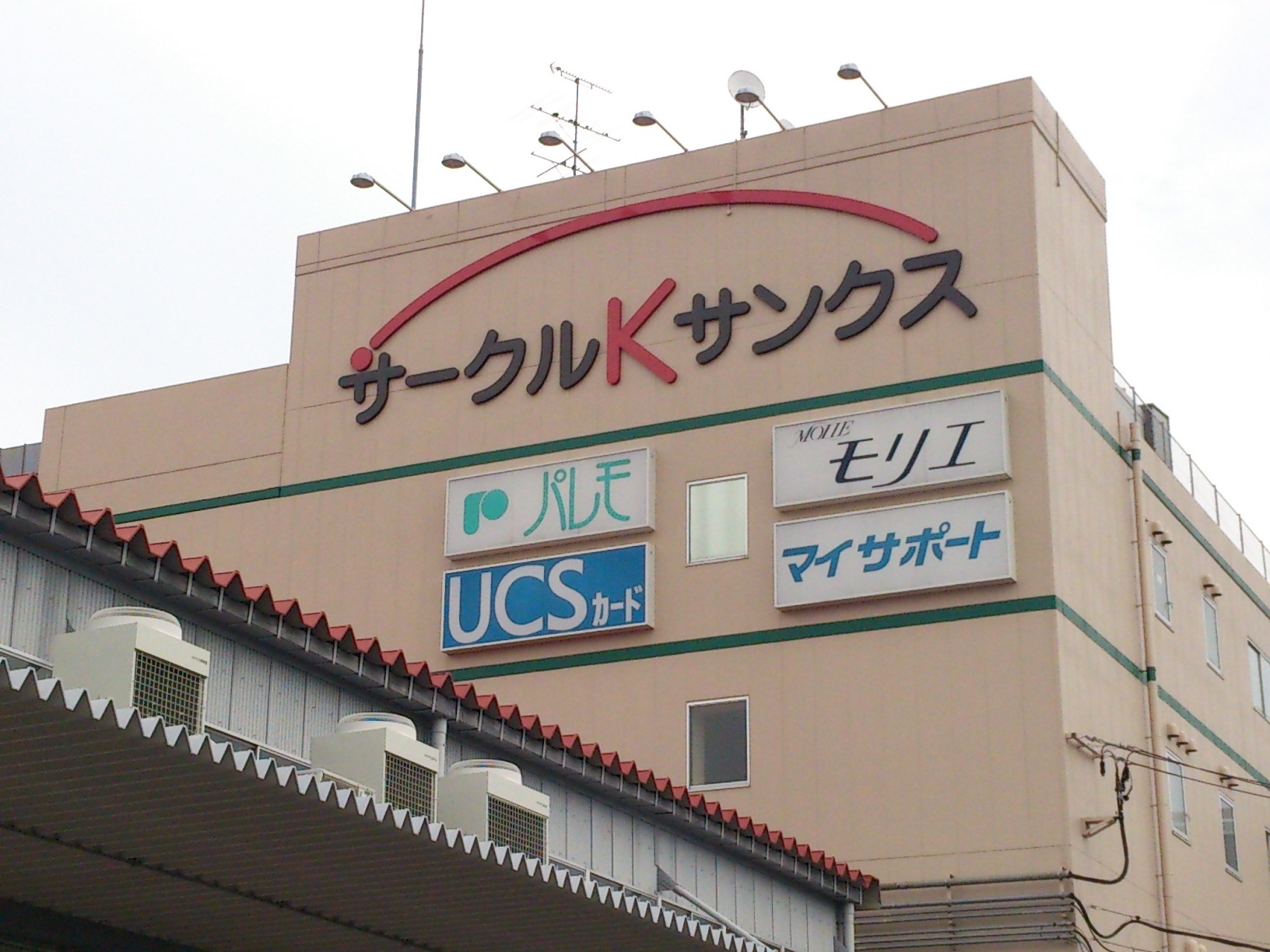
- Japanese version Circle K Sunkus logo as shown atop a building
- Native name: 株式会社サークルKサンクス
- Romanized name: Kabushiki-gaisha Sākuru Kei Sankusu
- Formerly: Circle K Japan Co., Ltd. (2001-2004)
- Type: Subsidiary
- Traded as: TYO: 3337
- Industry: Retail (Convenience stores)
- Founded: July 2, 2001; 25 years ago
- Defunct: September 1, 2016
- Fate: Absorbed into FamilyMart
- Successor: FamilyMart
- Headquarters: 20-1 Shiohama 2, Kōtō, Tokyo, Japan
- Key people: Motohiko Nakamura, President
- Brands: Circle K Sunkus
- Revenue: -
- Number of employees: 1,759 (2010)
- Parent: UNY Co., Ltd.
- Website: Circle K Sunkus' official website - at the Wayback Machine (archived 2016-01-04)

Derivation of the Sunkus logo

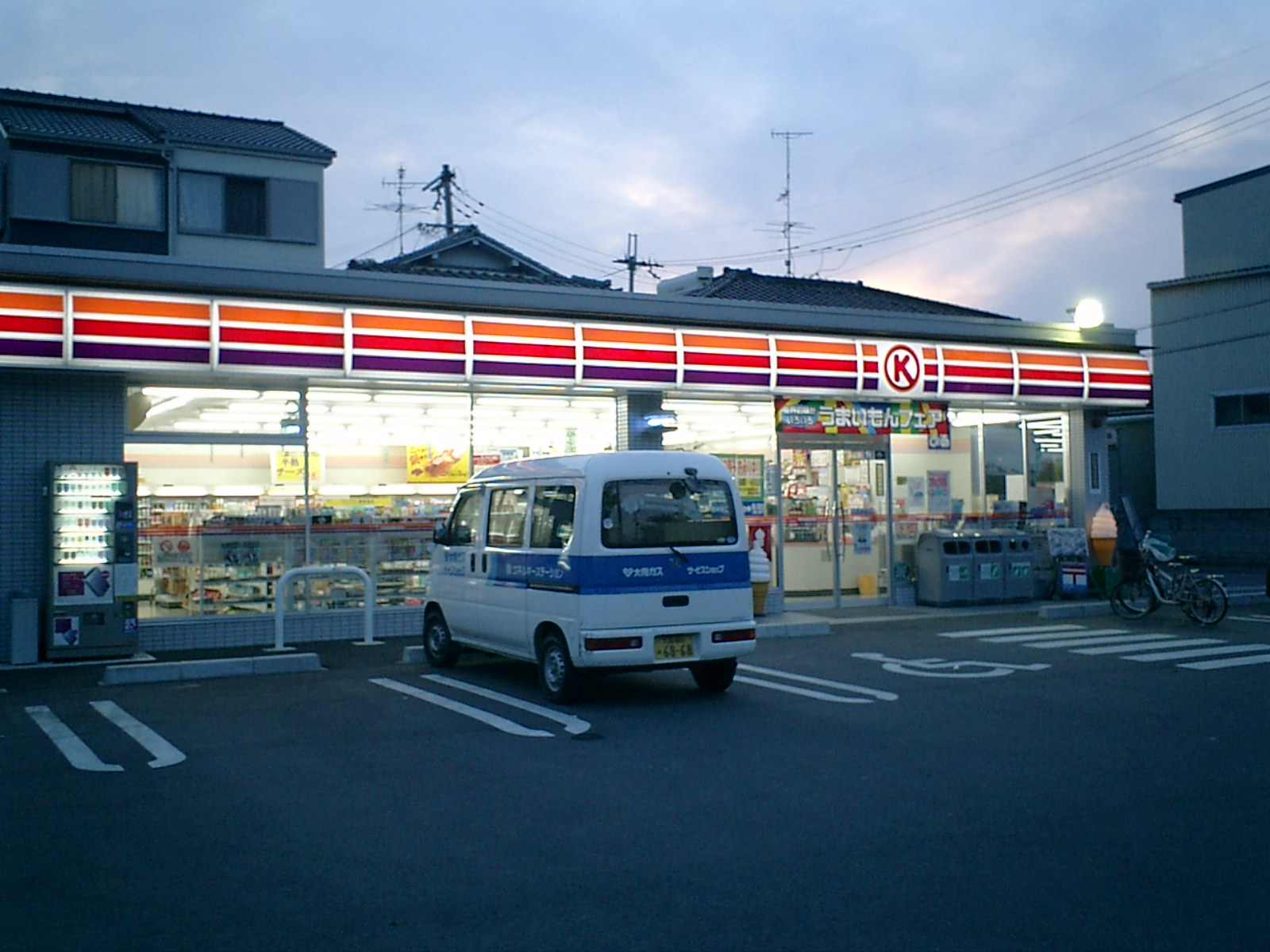
Circle K Higashi Osaka -Kawada shop (Higashi-Osaka Japan)

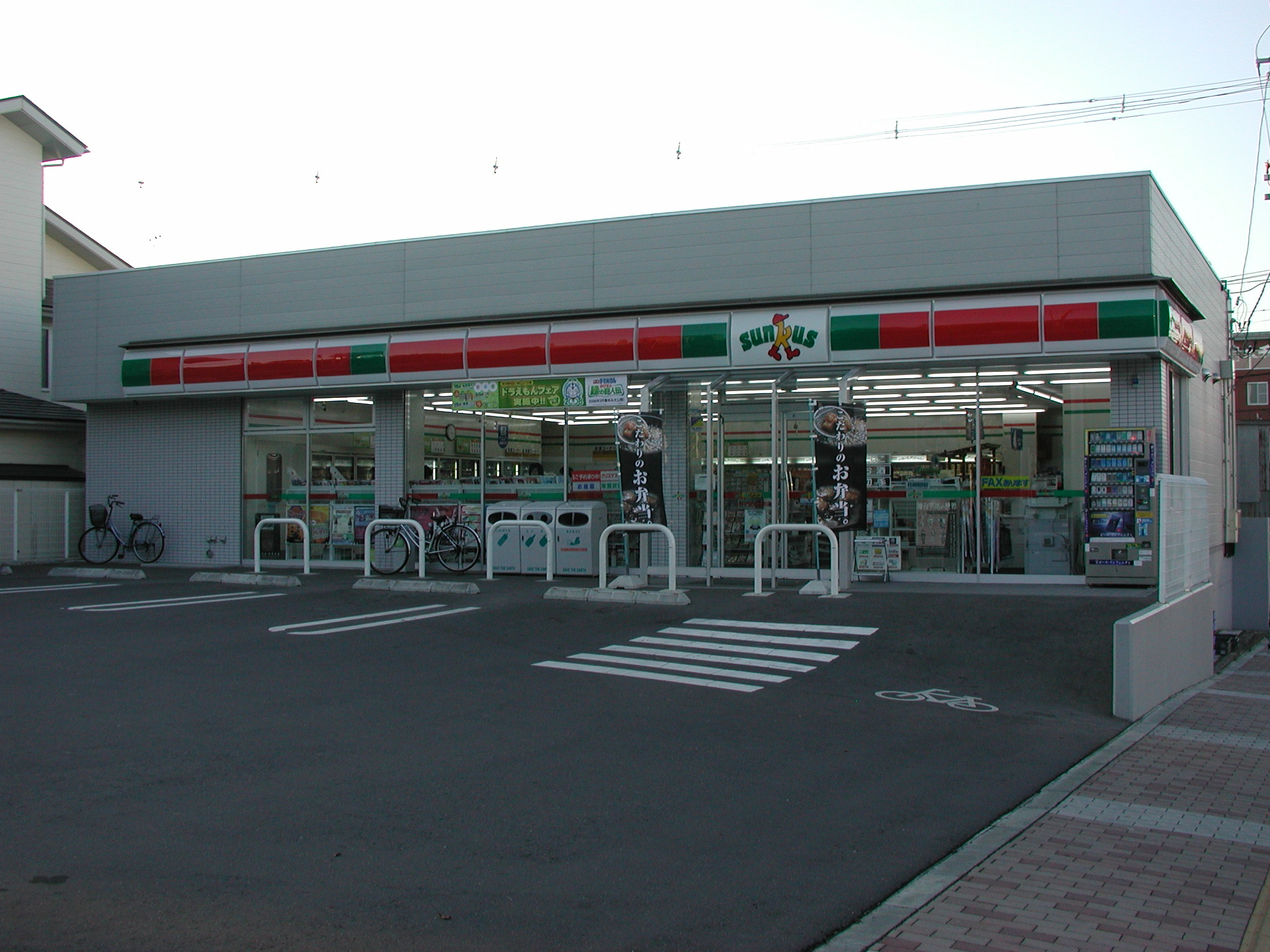
SUNKUS Hachinohe-Chibagakuenmae store

Circle K Sunkus (サークルKサンクス, Sākuru K Sankusu; stylized as CircleKSunkus) was a chain of company-operated and franchised convenience stores in Japan. The company is a division of UNY Co., Ltd., which licensed the Circle K name from Alimentation Couche-Tard, a Canadian convenience store company that owns the Circle K brand.

At the typical Japanese convenience store, goods such as magazines, manga, soft drinks, onigiri, and bento are available.

As of September 1, 2016, due to Circle K Sunkus’ acquisition and absorption by FamilyMart, all Circle K Sunkus stores have been rebranded as FamilyMart stores as a result of the FamilyMart Co. and Uny Group Holdings Co. merger.

== History ==
The first Circle K store in Japan opened on March 15, 1980, in Tenpaku-ku, Nagoya.

The first Sunkus store opened in Aoba-ku, Sendai, on July 23, 1980. The Sunkus chain expanded to Tokyo in 1981, Hokkaido in 1982, Osaka in 1989 and Nagoya in 1992.

Sunkus and Circle K Japan formed an equity and business alliance in October 1998.

The franchiser, Sunkus & Associates Inc., officially merged with Circle K Japan Co., Ltd., as of the September 1, 2004, fiscal year and was known officially as Circle K Sunkus Co., Ltd (株式会社サークルKサンクス). The two brands remained separate — convenience stores owned by the company had either a Sunkus sign or a Circle K sign.

== Facts about Sunkus ==
The word "Sunkus" is a combination of the words "Sun" and the word "Thanks", The logo is a combination of the words "Sun", "Kids", and "Us".
