= Air Japan =

Airline of Japan

Air Japan Co., Ltd. 株式会社エアージャパン Kabushiki-gaisha Eā Japan

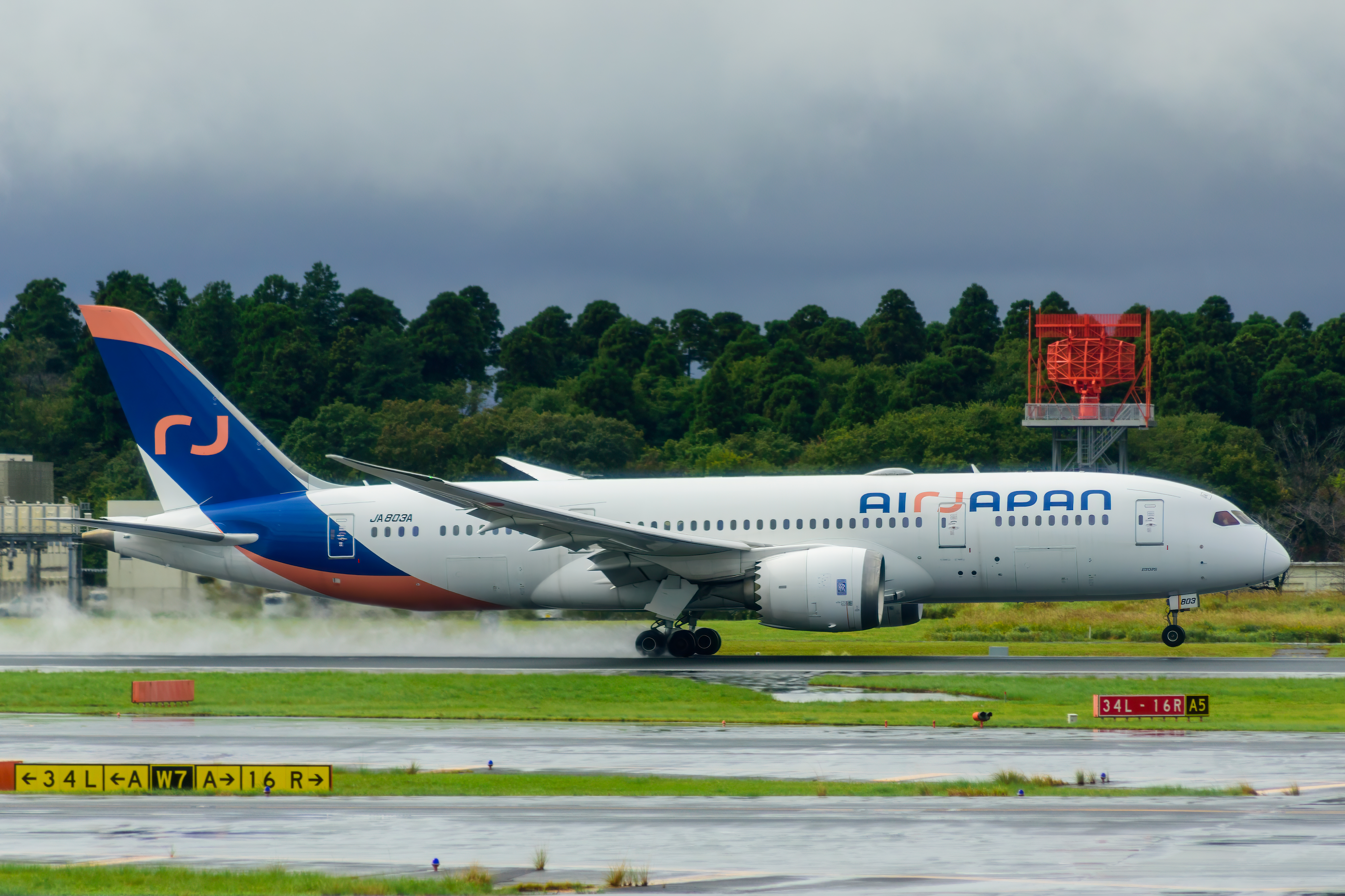
- An Air Japan Boeing 787-8 painted in the former AirJapan brand livery
IATA	ICAO	Call sign
NQ	AJX	AIR JAPAN
- Founded: June 29, 1990 (as World Air Network); July 5, 2000 (as Air Japan); March 8, 2022 (AirJapan brand)
- Commenced operations: January 1, 2001 (as Air Japan); February 9, 2024 (AirJapan brand)
- Ceased operations: March 28, 2026 (AirJapan brand)
- Operating bases: Narita International Airport
- Frequent-flyer program: ANA Mileage Club
- Fleet size: 3
- Destinations: 3
- Parent company: All Nippon Airways
- Headquarters: Narita, Chiba, Japan
- Key people: Hideki Mineguchi (President & CEO)
- Employees: 903 (June 2023)
- Website: www.air-japan.co.jp www.flyairjapan.com

Air Japan Co., Ltd. (株式会社エアージャパン, Kabushiki-gaisha Eā Japan; branded as Air Japan) is a Japanese airline headquartered at Narita International Airport in Narita, Chiba. Initially founded in 1990 as a charter airline, it transitioned to a scheduled carrier in 2000, operating flights on behalf of its parent company, All Nippon Airways. In 2022, ANA Group established AirJapan, a low-cost medium-haul brand operated by Air Japan. On October 30, 2025, the company announced that it would suspend all AirJapan brand flight operations, effective March 28, 2026, as a result of restructuring. ANA Group confirmed that Air Japan, the operating company, will continue to operate ANA brand international flights.

== History ==
=== Early years ===
Former AirJapan brand logo (2022–2026)

Former Air Japan logo

Air Japan was established as World Air Network on June 29, 1990, and became the charter airline arm of All Nippon Airways (ANA), but suspended operations on September 1, 1995. On July 5, 2000, World Air Network was renamed Air Japan, and began operating services under the ANA brand. It relaunched service as a scheduled airline on January 1, 2001; its first flight departed from Osaka to Seoul, South Korea with a Boeing 767-300 transferred from ANA.

On April 2, 2010, it was announced that Air Japan and ANA & JP Express would merge, with Air Japan being the surviving company. In taking over the operations of ANA & JP Express, which operated Boeing 767 cargo aircraft, Air Japan subsequently began operating both the passenger and cargo version of the Boeing 767. It would continue operating Boeing 767s on behalf of ANA, before beginning to operate Boeing 787s on behalf of ANA as well in 2018.

=== Redevelopment ===
On March 8, 2022, ANA unveiled plans to transform Air Japan into a low-cost medium-haul carrier, with flights to be launched in the second half of the 2023 fiscal year. It was launched with the slogan Fly Thoughtful, and its brand name was restyled and revised to AirJapan. Up to this point, Air Japan had shared the same callsign with All Nippon Airways on all flights except routes to and from Seoul Incheon, Hong Kong, Taipei, and Honolulu, which used the Air Japan call sign.

On March 9, 2023, ANA announced that Air Japan would be servicing flights to and from Southeast Asia starting in February 2024, using Boeing 787s in an all-economy class layout. The airline is intended to be ANA's rival to Japan Airlines' Zipair Tokyo, which competes in the same sector. Later that year, Air Japan's first destination from its Tokyo Narita hub was announced as Bangkok's Suvarnabhumi Airport, beginning on February 9, 2024, marking the airline's inaugural flight as a low-cost airline.

=== Cessation of AirJapan brand ===
Air Japan announced on October 30, 2025 that it would cease all operations of the AirJapan brand effective March 28, 2026. The decision is a result of restructuring of its parent company All Nippon Airways. Air Japan, the operating company that manages flights for the ANA and AirJapan brands, will continue to operate ANA brand international flights.

== Corporate affairs ==
The airline has its headquarters at the ANA Sky-center (ANAスカイセンター) 3B, Narita International Airport in Narita, Chiba. The headquarters were previously in Higashikōjiya (東糀谷), Ōta, Tokyo. In addition to its headquarters, Air Japan also used to have offices at Shiodome City Center in Minato, Tokyo.

== Destinations ==
As of July 2024, Air Japan operates passenger flights to the following destinations under its own brand. The list does not include destinations that the airline served whether with charter flights, scheduled flights operated on behalf of ANA, or any destinations served prior to its 2022 redevelopment as a low-cost airline.

Country	City	Airport	Notes	Refs
Japan	Tokyo	Narita International Airport	Base	
Singapore	Singapore	Changi Airport		
South Korea	Seoul	Incheon International Airport		
Thailand	Bangkok	Suvarnabhumi Airport		

== Fleet ==
As of August 2025, Air Japan operates the following aircraft:

Air Japan fleet
Aircraft	In service	Orders	Passengers	Notes
Boeing 787-8	3	3	324	
Total	3	3		

=== Fleet development ===
Prior to its redevelopment and relaunch as a low-cost airline, Air Japan operated Boeing 767s and 787s on behalf of ANA. Following redevelopment, Air Japan's fleet plans consist of Boeing 787-8 aircraft to be transferred from ANA. The airline's first Boeing 787-8, registered JA803A, was planned to be received on January 26, 2024, ahead of the airline's launch on February 9. Its second aircraft was planned to be received in April 2024, with a total of six aircraft to be received by the end of the 2025 fiscal year.

== Service concept ==
Air Japan's aircraft are configured entirely in economy class seating, consisting of 324 seats in a 3–3–3 layout. As a low-cost airline, Air Japan charges fees for additional services including additional baggage allowances and Wi-Fi access, and offers a buy-on-board service for in-flight catering, amenities, and goods. It offers streamable in-flight entertainment to personal devices.
