= UNY =

Japanese supermarket chain

- Company type: KK
- Industry: Supermarkets
- Founded: 1969 as UNY Co., Ltd. 2012 as UNY Group Holdings, Ltd.
- Headquarters: Inazawa, Aichi
- Area served: Japan, China, Hong Kong
- Parent: Pan Pacific International Holdings
- Website: www.uny.co.jp

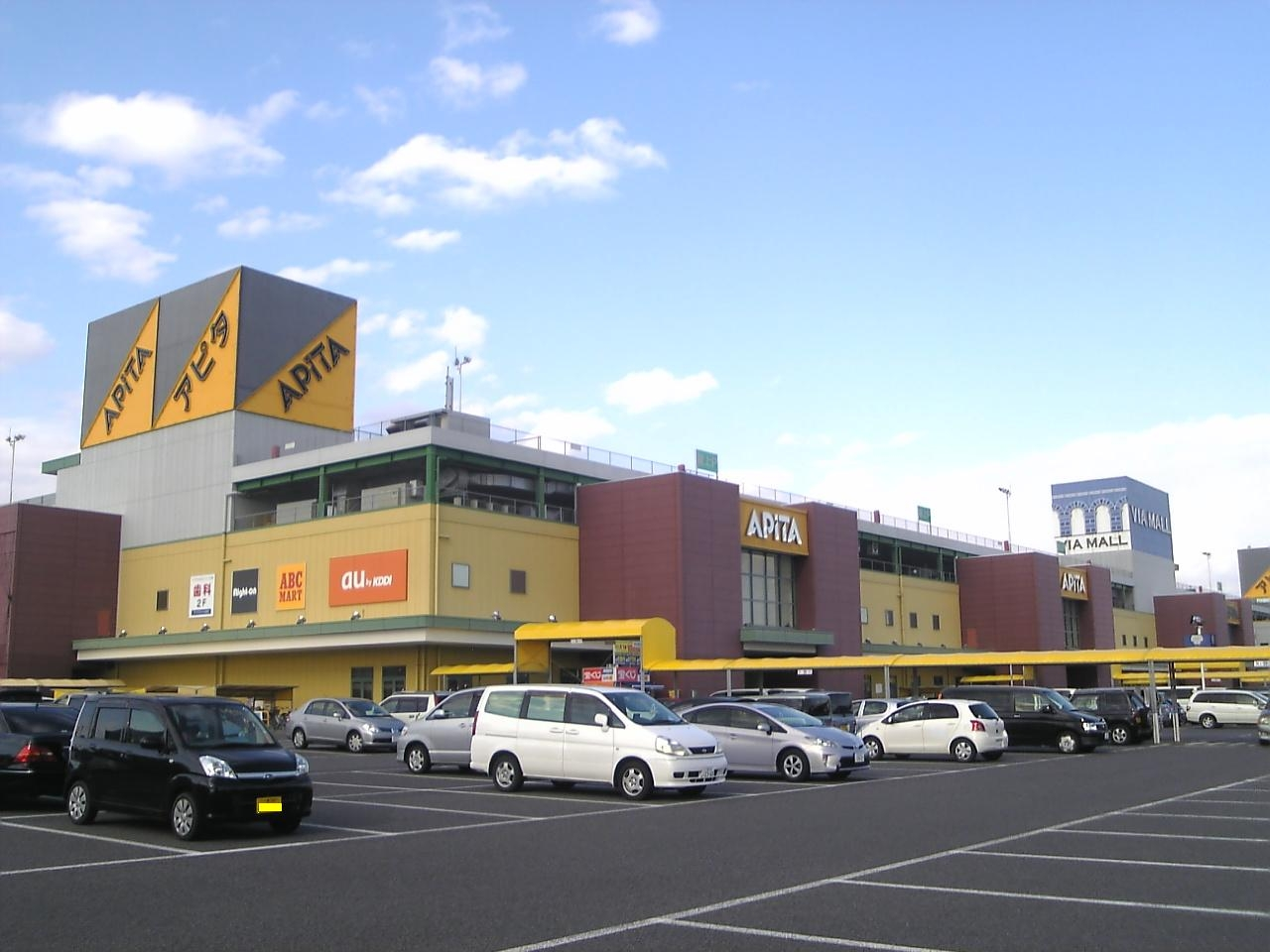
APiTA in Konan, Aichi Prefecture

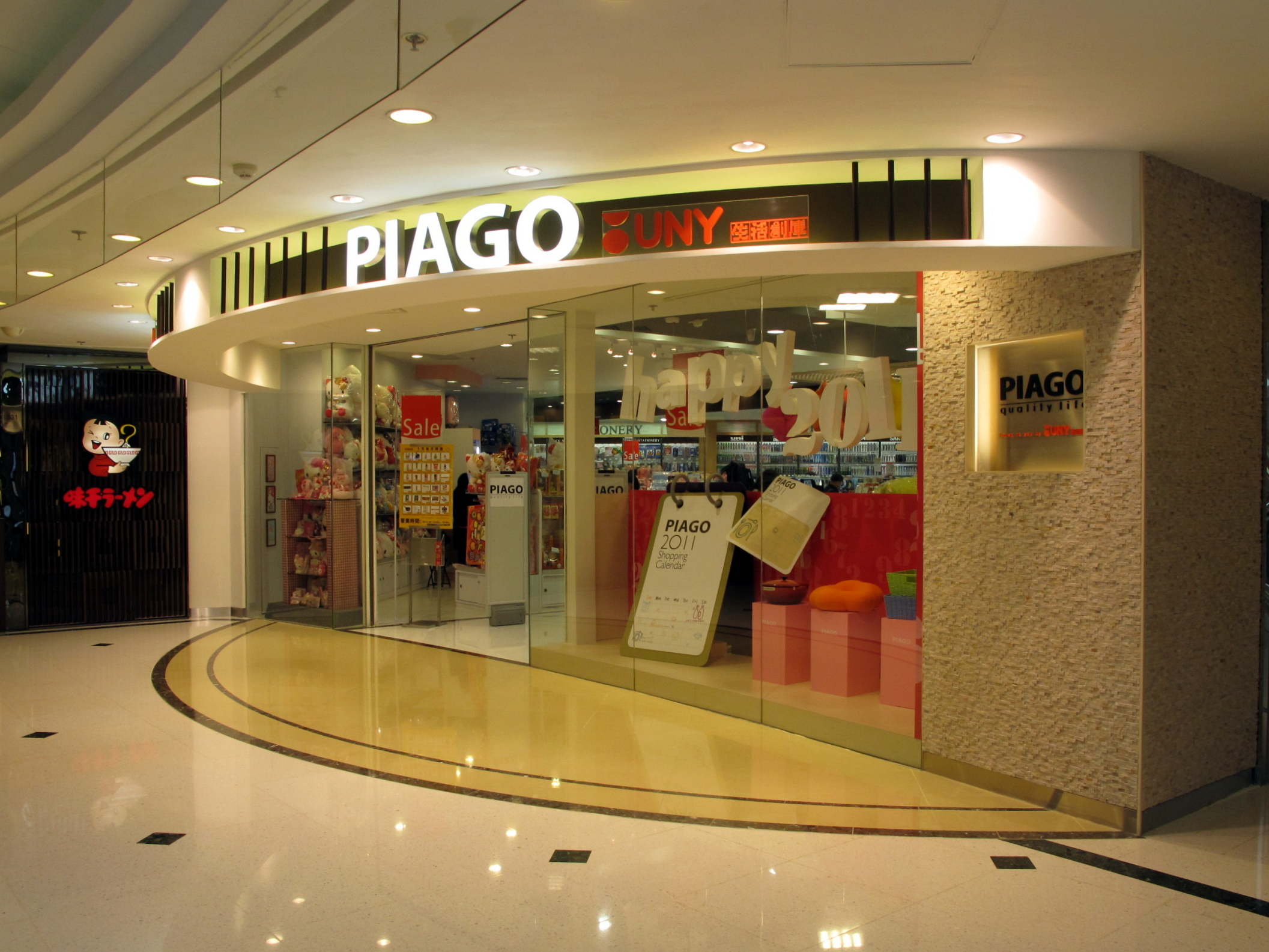
Piago UNY in Telford Gardens Plaza, Hong Kong

UNY Co., Ltd. (ユニー株式会社, Yunī Kabushikigaisha) is a company that operates a chain of supermarkets in Japan. Most of the stores are mainly located in the Chūbu and Kantō regions, with an international branch in Cityplaza, Taikoo Shing, Hong Kong operated by Uny (HK) Co., Ltd. with a brand name called APiTA, which is a subsidiary company of Henderson Land Development, a Hong Kong real estate company controlled by Hong Kong tycoon Lee Shau-kee. The company is headquartered in Inazawa, Aichi Prefecture.

In June 2018, UNY Hong Kong was acquired by Henderson Investment Ltd. and officially renamed as “Unicorn Stores (HK) Ltd.”, rather acquired by its subsidiary company Urban Kirin. Therefore, Uny became an indirect wholly owned subsidiary of the company.

== Chains ==
- APiTA
- Circle K Sunkus
- Piago

== Stores ==
So far, Unicorn Stores (HK) Ltd. operates 2 GMS and 2 supermarkets, namely APITA in Tai Koo, UNY in Lok Fu, Yuen Long, and Tseung Kwan O, as well as Guu San (the new premium Japanese lifestyle grocery store of Unicorn Stores (HK)) in Tsim Sha Tsui.
