= Advance Aviation Jet =

Thai air charter operation

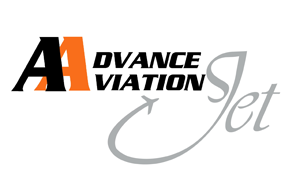
IATA	ICAO	Call sign
-	AJV	Aircraft Registration
- Founded: 2011; 15 years ago
- Operating bases: Bangkok International Airport (Sanambin Don Mueang), Bangkok Thailand
- Hubs: Don Mueang International Airport, Bangkok, Thailand
- Fleet size: 3
- Destinations: Worldwide
- Headquarters: 499 Benchachinda Building Vibhavadhi-Rangsit Road, Ladyao, Jatuchak, Bangkok Thailand
- Key people: Chai Nasylvanta
- Website: advanceaviation.co.th

Advance Aviation Jet (Advance Jet) is a Thai air charter operation registered in Bangkok, Thailand. Established in 2011, the company is specialized in business jet management and operation, as well as in other aviation-related activities, including consulting, flight support and ground handling. It works in partnership with three subsidiaries: Advance Aviation, SkyDance and Universal Aviation (Thailand).

An operations control center is located at Advance Aviation Jet's headquarters in Bangkok, Don Mueang International Airport.

== History ==
Advance Aviation Jet was founded in February 2011 by Chai Nasylvanta, four years after the successful inception of Advance Aviation Company Limited. Advance Aviation Jet received an AOC (air operator certificate) from the CAAT (Civil Aviation Authority of Thailand, formerly known as the DCA).

In October 2011, beginning with a registered capital of 150 million baht (approximately 5 million US dollars) and 550 million baht (approximately 16 million US dollars) subordinated loan from shareholders, the company operated without any external commercial debt, including aircraft acquisition in cash.

In early 2015, Advance Jet formed a joint venture with Universal Weather and Aviation Corporation, the Houston-based Ground Handling and Trip Support, called Universal Aviation (Thailand) Co., Ltd., under the motto "where sky and safety meet." The company was a dedicated Gulfstream operator.

== Headquarters ==
Advance Aviation Jet is located at 499 Benchachinda Building Vibhavadhi-Rangsit Road, Ladyao, Jatujak, Bangkok, Thailand.

=== Based airport ===
- Bangkok International Airport, Bangkok

=== Office ===
- Bangkok International Airport, 2311A, 2nd floor of Terminal 1, Vibhavadi-Rangsit Road, Sanambin Don Muang 10210

== Fleet ==
- Advance Aviation Jet's two Gulfstream G200

A/C type	Registration number	Year of manufacture	Homebase	Seats
Gulfstream G200	HS-LEE	2003 (refurbished 2011)	Don Mueang	10
Gulfstream G200	HS-HAN	2007 (refurbished 2013)	Don Mueang	10
