= Famima!! =

Convenience store chain

- Company type: Subsidiary
- Industry: Retail / grocery
- Founded: 2004; 22 years ago
- Defunct: October 28, 2015; 10 years ago
- Headquarters: Los Angeles, California, U.S.
- Number of locations: 10
- Area served: California
- Products: Bakery, delicatessen, frozen foods, snack food
- Services: Convenience
- Parent: FamilyMart

Famima!! was a chain of small upscale convenience stores owned by FamilyMart stores of Japan. Founded on September 17, 2004, the stores brought the Japanese model of premium convenience stores targeting the middle- and upper-level income group of 21 – 41 years of age to the United States. Famima stores feature upscale design and premium foods, packaging deli-style "lunch boxes" (sandwiches, panini, sushi), international and American goods popular in the United States.

FamilyMart opened and closed a number of Famima stores in Southern California between 2005 and 2013. The company originally had plans for 30 test stores with 220 additional stores by 2009. However, the company's contraction came as quickly as its expansion and Famima closed many of the original test sites. There were nine active locations as of July 2010, according to the company's website.

In 2015, FamilyMart liquidated Famima Corp. USA and announced that it would be withdrawing from the United States market, permanently closing all remaining Famima stores in Southern California by the end of October 2015, in order to concentrate its resources on its network of stores in Asia.

== Locations ==
All locations were formerly located in the Greater Los Angeles area.

- Downtown Los Angeles (all closed - date unknown)
  - Two California Plaza
  - City National Plaza
  - 700 Wilshire
  - Roosevelt (7th Street at Flower Street)
  - Pacific Center (6th Street at Olive Street, near Pershing Square)
  - Broadway Arcade Building
  - 622 Flower Street
  - Union Station
- Third Street Promenade in Santa Monica (closed as of September 22, 2015)
- Hollywood Plaza on Hollywood Blvd. (near Hollywood and Highland) (closed as of March 2011)
- Culver Center in Culver City (Venice Boulevard at Overland Ave) (closed as of October 2011)
- Arcadia - Santa Anita Ave and Live Oak Ave (closed as of October 2009)
- Fountain Valley - Bushard St. and Warner Ave (closed as of December 6, 2009)
- Glendale (closed - date unknown)
- 8th & Figueroa (closed - date unknown)
- Lakewood - Downey and South Street (closed - date unknown)
- Long Beach
  - 2nd Street in Belmont Shore (closed as of March 1, 2008)
  - Los Coyotes Diagonal (closed as of March 1, 2008)
- Pasadena
  - Playhouse District - Colorado Boulevard (closed as of November 30, 2009)
  - Old Pasadena - Raymond Avenue and Union Street (closed as of January 2010)
- Torrance (closed as of May 30, 2008)
- West Hollywood (closed as of February 1, 2009)
- Santa Anita Mall in Arcadia (closed as of May 2013)
- Westwood (closed - date unknown)
