= Air Nippon =

Regional airline of Japan (1974–2012)

Air Nippon Co., Ltd. エアーニッポン株式会社 Eā Nippon Kabushiki-gaisha
IATA	ICAO	Call sign
WJ (1974–1987); EL (1987–2012)	NKK (1974–1987); ANK (1987–2012)	KINKYORI (1974–1987); ANK AIR (1987–2012)
- Founded: March 13, 1974 (as Nihon Kinkyori Airways)
- Commenced operations: October 10, 1974 (as Nihon Kinkyori Airways); April 1, 1987 (as Air Nippon)
- Ceased operations: April 25, 2012 (merged into ANA Wings)
- Operating bases: Haneda Airport
- Frequent-flyer program: ANA Mileage Club
- Alliance: Star Alliance (affiliate; 1999–2012)
- Fleet size: 35
- Parent company: All Nippon Airways
- Headquarters: Shiodome City Center, Minato, Tokyo

Former Air Nippon logo

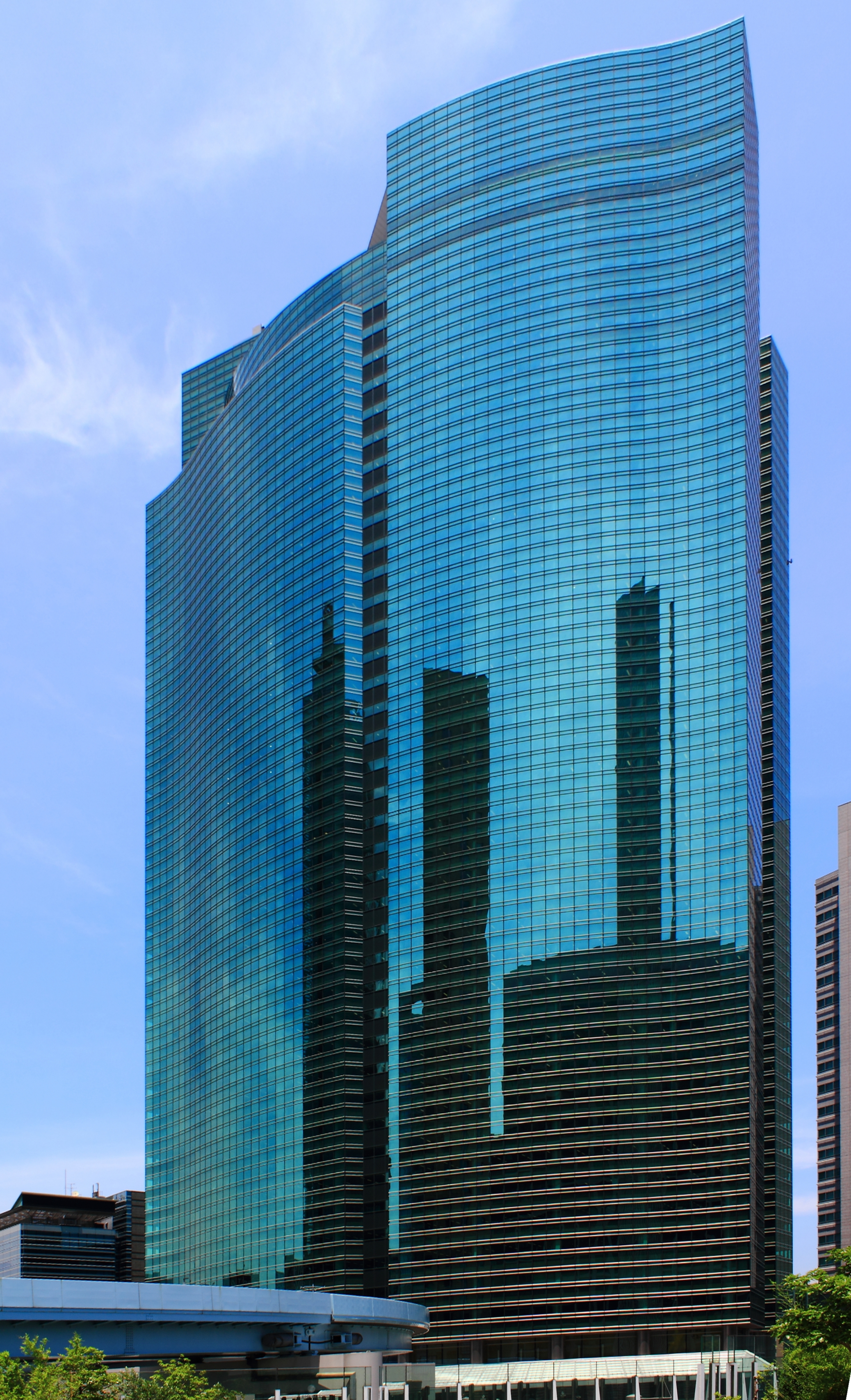
Shiodome City Center

Air Nippon was a regional airline headquartered in the Shiodome City Center complex in Minato, Tokyo, Japan.

It was a wholly owned subsidiary of All Nippon Airways (ANA). Its main base was Haneda Airport.

== Code data ==
In April 2004, Air Nippon adopted ANA flight codes and numbers for all domestic services.

== History ==
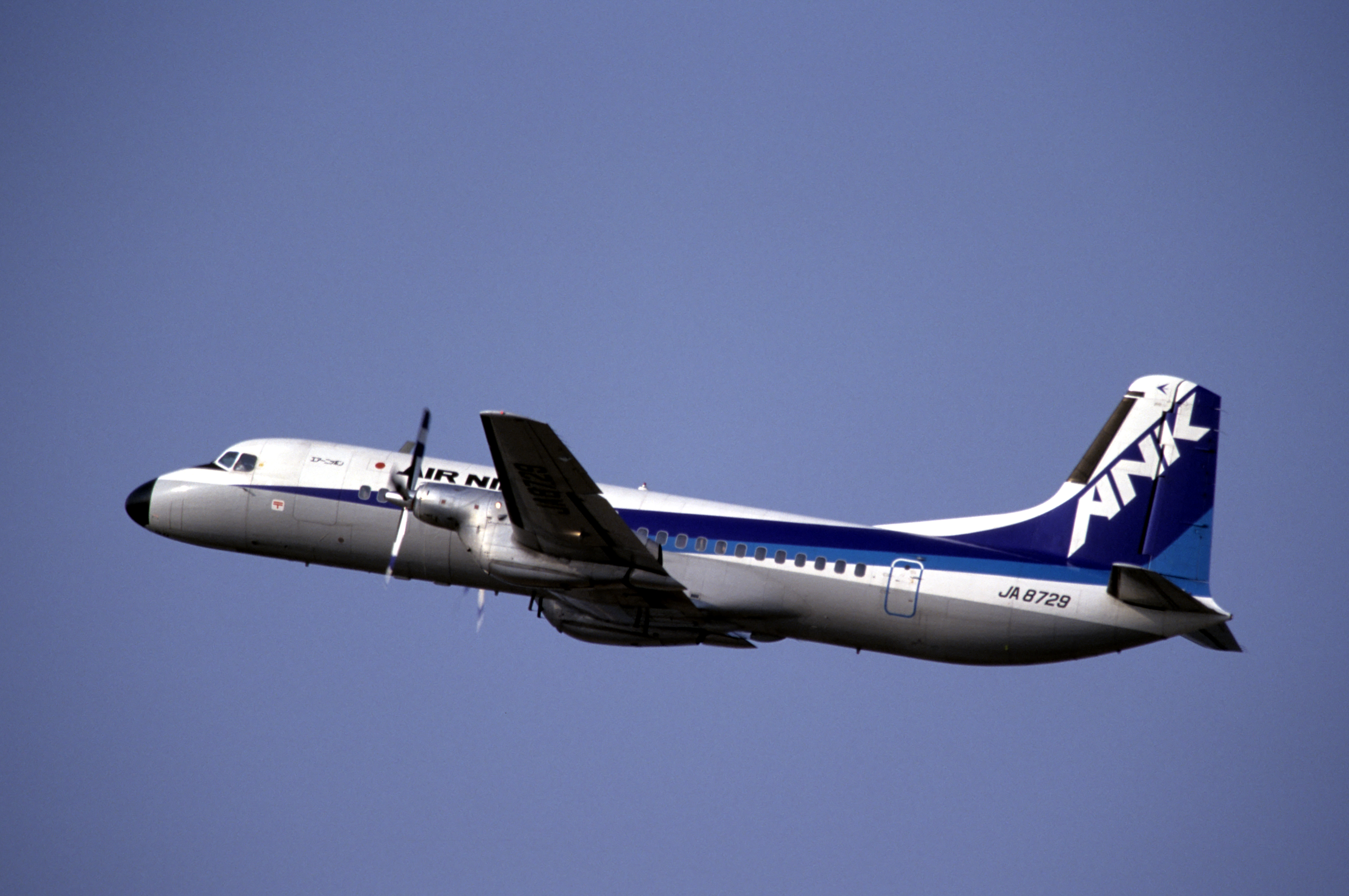
A former Air Nippon NAMC YS-11.

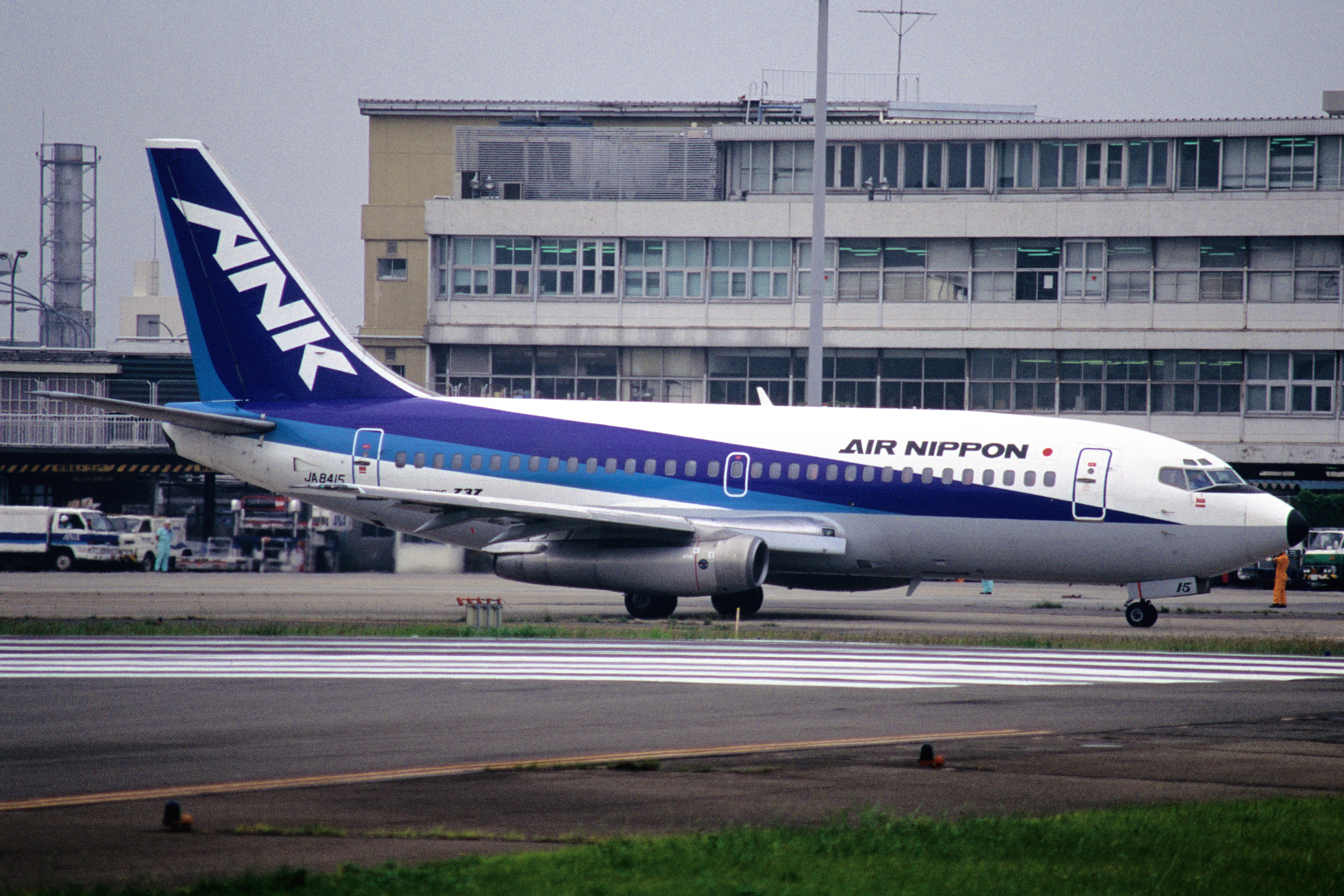
A former Air Nippon Boeing 737-200.

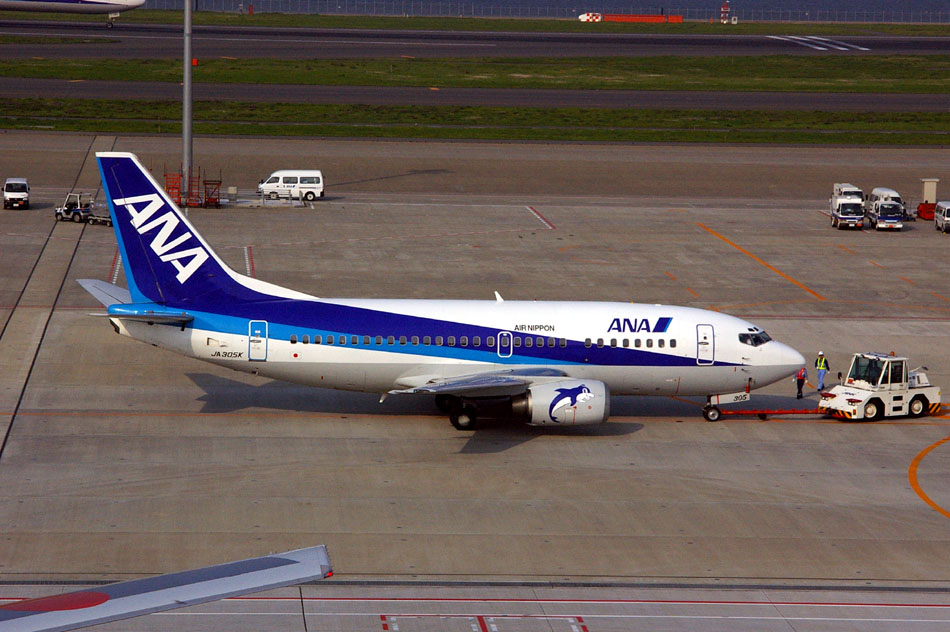
former Air Nippon Boeing 737-500 at Tokyo International Airport (Haneda)

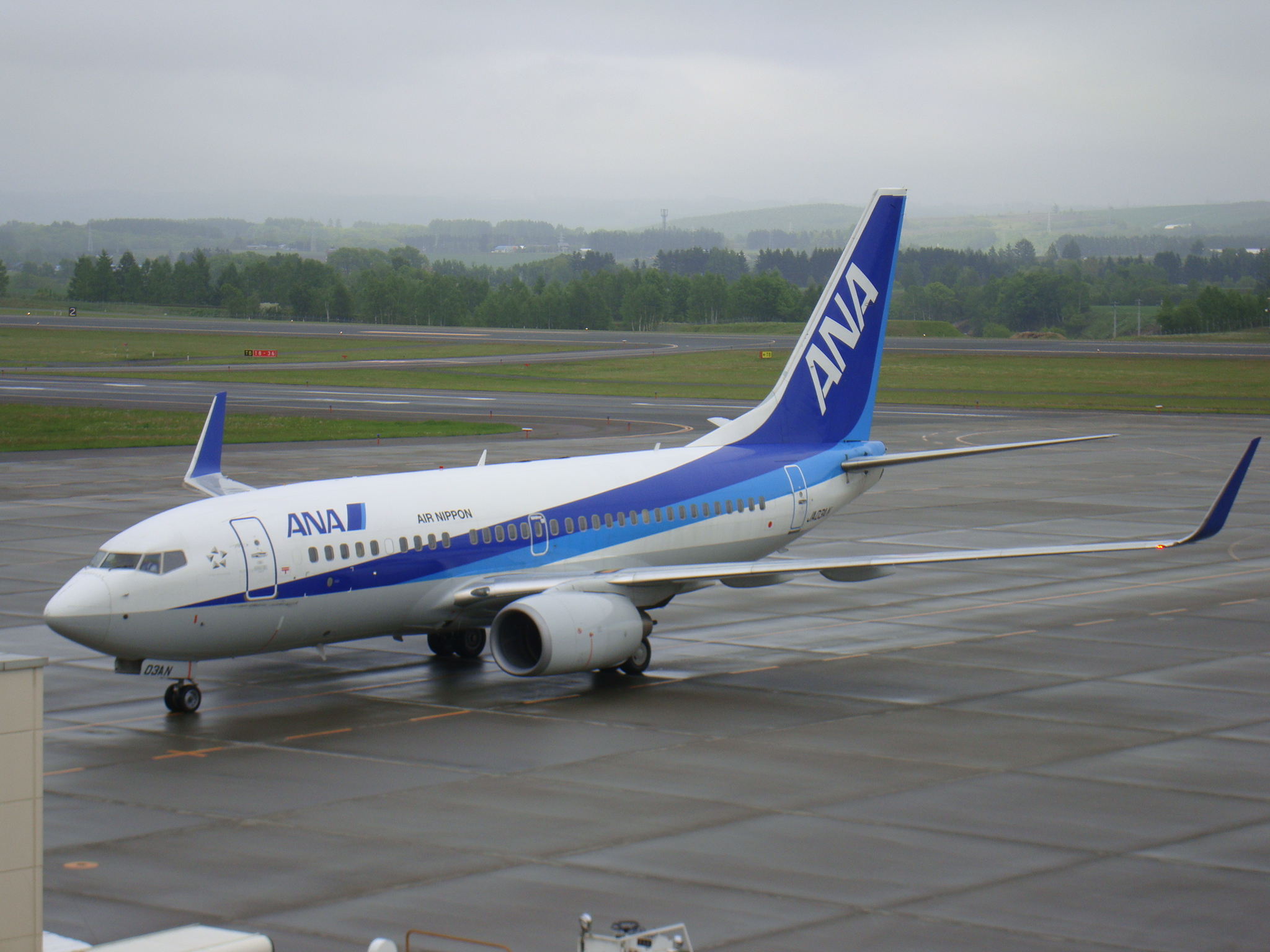
former Air Nippon Boeing 737-700 at Memanbetsu Airport

The company was founded by ANA, Japan Airlines and TOA Domestic as Nippon Kinkyori Airways (日本近距離航空, Nippon Kinkyori Kōkū; lit. Japan Short-Distance Airline, NKK) in March 1974 and started operations on 10 October 1974. The name Air Nippon was adopted in 1987, and the abbreviation ANK comes from the full, somewhat redundant name Air Nippon Kabushiki kaisha (lit. Air Nippon joint stock corporation.).

It had 12 Boeing 737-200 aircraft. ANA and Air Nippon used different liveries and IATA codes on domestic flights until April 2004, when Air Nippon adopted ANA livery and ANA flight numbers. As an ANA subsidiary, it is considered a full Star Alliance member. However, on Republic of China flights before April 2008, Air Nippon's IATA code EL was still used due to political reasons and these flights are not considered being Star Alliance flights.

In 1998 the airline was headquartered in Shinagawa, Tokyo.

In 2002 Air Nippon was headquartered on the 5th floor of the Utility Center Building (ユーティリティセンタービル, Yūtiriti Sentā Biru) by Tokyo International Airport in Ōta. Shiodome City Center, which became headquarters of Air Nippon and parent company ANA, opened in 2003.

The airline employed 1,686 staff (at March 2007). On 1 October 2010, Air Nippon Network was merged into ANA Wings.

On 1 April 2012, Air Nippon was merged to All Nippon Airways.

== Fleet ==
The Air Nippon fleet consisted of the following aircraft throughout operations:

Air Nippon Airways Historical Fleet
Aircraft	Total	Introduced	Retired	Passengers	Notes
Airbus A320-200	3	1992	2010	166	
Boeing 737-200	11	1983	2000	126	Transferred from All Nippon Airways.
Boeing 737-400	2	2000	2005	168	Transferred to Hokkaido International Airlines.
Boeing 737-500	25	1995	2010	126	
Boeing 737-500	25	1995	2010	133	
Boeing 737-700	16	2005	2012	120	
Boeing 737-700ER	2	2007	2012	36	Operated as ANA Business Jet.
Boeing 737-700ER	2	2007	2012	48	Operated as ANA Business Jet.
Boeing 737-800	16	2008	2012	167	
Boeing 737-800	16	2008	2012	176	
Boeing 767-300ER	3	1994	2010	216	
De Havilland Canada Dash 8-300	5	2001	2002	56	Transferred to Air Nippon Network.
De Havilland Canada DHC-6 Twin Otter	Unknown	1974	1994	10	Transferred to Air Hokkaido.
NAMC YS-11	Unknown	1978	2003	Unknown	Transferred from All Nippon Airways.
