= ANA & JP Express =

Cargo airline of Japan (2006–2010)

ANA & JP Express Co., Ltd. 株式会社 ANA & JP エクスプレス Kabushiki-gaisha Ei-enu-ei ando Jei-pī Ekusupuresu
IATA	ICAO	Call sign
9N	AJV	AYJAY CARGO
- Founded: February 1, 2006
- Commenced operations: October 2, 2006
- Ceased operations: July 1, 2010 (merged into Air Japan)
- Hubs: Narita International Airport
- Focus cities: Incheon International Airport
- Fleet size: 9
- Destinations: 3
- Parent company: All Nippon Airways
- Headquarters: Shiodome City Center, Minato, Tokyo
- Key people: Tadakazu Seino (President & CEO)
- Website: ajv.ana-g.com

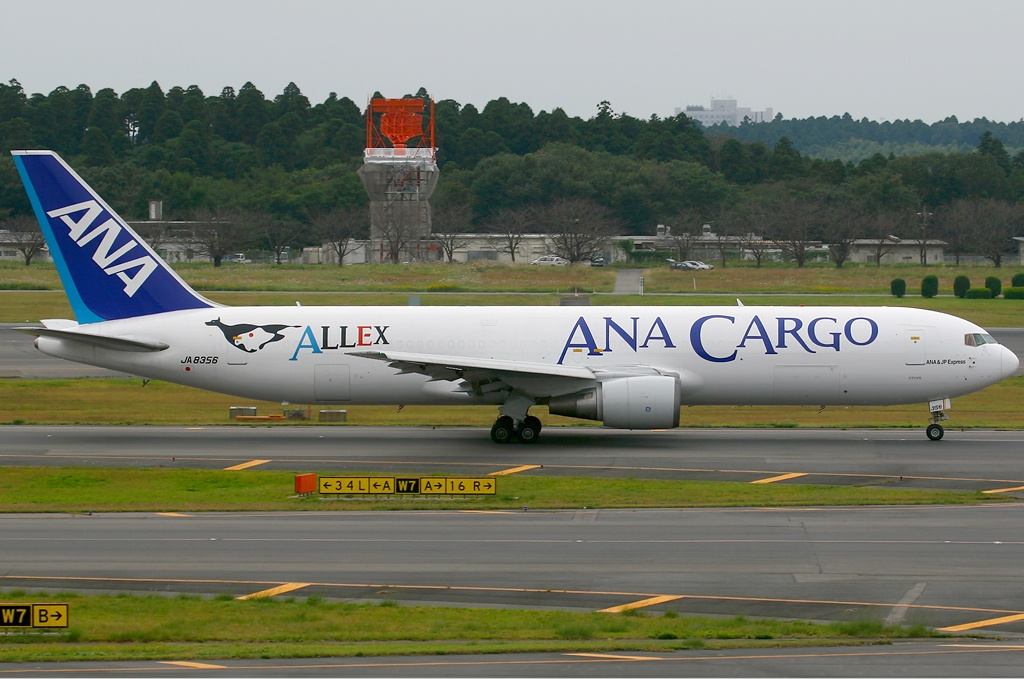
Boeing 767-300ER(BCF) of ANA & JP Express (2009).

ANA & JP Express (AJV) was a cargo airline based in the Shiodome City Center in Minato, Tokyo, Japan. It operated services between Japan and South Korea, using aircraft from the All Nippon Airways fleet. Founded in 2006, the company merged into Air Japan in 2010.

== History ==
The company was founded on February 1, 2006 and started operations on October 2, 2006 with the inaugurational Nagoya (Centrair) - Anchorage - Chicago (O'Hare) service.

By April 1, 2010, when the merger with Air Japan was announced, ANA & JP Express was completely owned by All Nippon Airways.

== Route network ==
As of February 2008, AJV maintained cargo flights from Tokyo (Narita), Osaka (Kansai), and Nagoya (Centrair) to Seoul (Incheon). Earlier, trans-Pacific flights had been operated, but by 2008, ANA's trans-Pacific freight was flown by the mainline and ABX Air wet lease.
