= Air Traffic Controller 3 =

- Genre: Simulation
- Developer: TechnoBrain
- Publisher: TechnoBrain
- Platform: Microsoft Windows
- Original release: 2008–2012
- First release: February 25, 2008
- Latest release: December 21, 2012

Air Traffic Controller 3 (ぼくは航空管制官３, Boku wa Kūkō Kanseikan San; also known as "ATC3") is a Japanese simulation puzzle game released by TechnoBrain from 2008 to 2012. The game has many editions that were released during that time including some that feature special events or airports like the former Kai Tak International Airport in Hong Kong or Kadena Air Force Base in Okinawa. It is the third version of the Air Traffic Controller series of simulations.

== Gameplay ==
The objective of each level is the reach a required number of points to pass while avoiding many of the dangers of being an air traffic controller. There are many reasons that can cause a game over for the stage, including a near miss, head-ons during take-off or taxiing, or having enough points to pass the level. Players must also avoid making the stress level for aircraft go up, which results in a game over if it reaches 100%. Players must also direct aircraft on to the runway direction facing into the wind, or else the aircraft will do an automatic go-around on the captain's decisions. In some games, players are able to control traffic from other airports.

A cutscene is at the end of every level, with a different version of the game's opening theme. The opening can be unlocked by passing at least one level while the ending requires the player to complete the last default stage.

== Airports ==
=== Tokyo BigWing ===
- Airport: Tokyo International Airport
- Airlines: Japan Airlines, All Nippon Airways, Skymark Airlines, Hokkaido International Airlines, Japan Coast Guard
- Release date: February 25, 2008
- Version: 1.03B (Patch from official site)
- Special Events: During Stage 3, the first aircraft to take off from runway 16L will encounter a bird strike and taxi back to the gate. Stage 6, aircraft landing at either runway 34L and 34R will trigger microburst and windshear, causing closure of runway 34L and 34R for some time.

=== Okinawa BlueCorridor ===
- Airport: Naha Airport
- Airlines Japan Airlines, Japan Transocean Air, All Nippon Airways, Skymark Airlines, Japan Coast Guard, China Airlines, China Eastern Airlines, Asiana Airlines, Galaxy Airlines, Japan Air Self-Defense Force, Ryukyu Air Commuter, United States Navy, United States Air Force
- Release date: July 2, 2008
- Version: 1.03 (Patch from official site)
- Able to control traffic from Kadena AFB

=== Osaka ParallelContact ===
- Airport: Osaka International Airport
- Airlines: Japan Airlines, All Nippon Airways, Japan Air Commuter, and JAL Express
- Release date: October 24, 2008
- Special events: Expect any Techno Air plane to cause problems for you in any stage they appear in, which range from medical emergencies leading to requests back to gate, to outright landing blunders.

=== ANA Edition ===
- Airport: Tokyo International Airport
- Airlines: All Nippon Airways
- Release date: November 1, 2008
- Featuring the ANA Gold Jet and the ability to see how parts move on the aircraft such as the flaps and landing gear. It also lets you view the aircraft 360°.

=== Tokyo BigWing (English version) ===
- Airport: Tokyo International Airport
- Release date: November 17, 2008
- Version: 1.06
- All Japanese Airlines have been replaced with generic colour name (e.g. blue, red, yellow, and green) due to copyright issue.

=== Hong Kong Kai Tak International Airport ===
- Airport: Kai Tak Airport
- Airlines: Cathay Pacific, Dragon Air, China Eastern Airlines, Air France, Northwest Airlines, Northwest Cargo Airlines, Eva Air, All Nippon Airways, Japan Airlines, Garuda Indonesia, Air Hong Kong
- Release date: February 27, 2009
- Version: 1.00
- Featuring first airport outside Japan and More Difficult Stages including more frequent near-misses, TechnoBrain Air doesn't make an appearance for the first time.
- New Aircraft including Boeing 747-200F, McDonnell Douglas MD-11 and Lockheed L-1011
- Old Cathay Pacific Livery
- Chek Lap Kok International Airport makes an appearance in the opening and under construction in the game.

=== Sendai Airmanship ===
- Airport: Sendai Airport
- Airlines:Japan Trans Ocean Air, All Nippon Cargo Japan Airlines, All Nippon Airways, Hokkaido International Airlines, Ibex Airlines, Eva Air, Asiana Airlines, Japan Coast Guard, Ministry of Land, Infrastructure and Transport, Aviation University
- Release date: June 26, 2009
- Special features: The function of speed reduction is returned. No delivery channel, job taken over by Ground.

=== New Chitose SnowingDay ===
- Airport: New Chitose Airport
- Airlines: Japan Airlines, All Nippon Airways, Hokkaido International Airlines, Ibex Airlines, Skymark Airlines, SAT Airlines, Nippon Cargo Airlines, China Eastern Airlines, Cathay Pacific Airways, China Airlines, Japan Coast Guard, Japan Air Self-Defense Force, Hokkaido Air System
- Air Force One (official airliner of the USA President) and Escort One (jet fighters escorting Air Force One) make appearance at the very end.
- Release date: October 22, 2009

=== Kansai International Airport CrossOver ===
- Airport: Kansai International Airport
- Airlines: Japan Airlines, All Nippon Airways, Skymark Airlines, Asiana Airlines, Eva Air, China Eastern Airlines, Cathay Pacific Airways, Thai Airways International, Air France, Finnair, Garuda Indonesia, United Airlines, Nippon Cargo Airlines, United Parcel Service, Japan Coast Guard
- Release date: February 25, 2010 (Limited Edition), March 19, 2010 (Regular)
- Altitude separation and visual approach features are added
- There is also ability to control Osaka International Airport and Kobe Airport aircraft traffic
- Bird management to chase birds away from a runway causes the runway to be momentarily closed in the middle of stage 4.

=== ExtendScenario 1 (expansion pack) ===
- Airport: Tokyo International Airport, Osaka International Airport.
- Airlines: Japan Airlines (both airports), All Nippon Airways (both airports), JAL Express (Osaka), Japan Air System (Osaka), Japan Air Commuter (Osaka), Ibex Airlines (Osaka), Hokkaido International Airlines (Tokyo), Skymark Airlines (Tokyo), Skynet Asia Airways, Ministry of Land, Infrastructure and Transport (Tokyo)
- Release date: June 21, 2010 (download only)
- Each airport has 2 additional stages. Concorde makes an appearance in Tokyo International Airport. Skynet Asia Airways, previously included in ATC2, makes a return appearance to Tokyo International Airport. An All Nippon Airways jet tests on the taxiway in the new international terminal in Tokyo International Airport. A plane which belongs to Ministry of Land, Infrastructure and Transport conducts an ILS testing on Tokyo International Airport's 4th runway, the D runway. Japan Airlines, All Nippon Airways, and JAL Express use their old liveries in one of two stages in Osaka International Airport while Japan Air System and Japan Air Commuter use their liveries prior to the merger with Japan Airlines. Ibex Airlines, previously included in ATC2, makes a return appearance to Osaka International Airport. Commercial YS-11 makes an appearance in Osaka International Airport.

=== Tokyo Dream Gateway ===
- Airport: Tokyo International Airport
- Airlines: Japan Airlines, All Nippon Airways, Hokkaido International Airlines, Skymark Airlines, Skynet Asia Airways, Cathay Pacific Airways, Asiana Airlines, China Eastern Airlines, Shanghai Airlines, China Airlines, EVA Air, Thai Airways International, AirAsia X, Hawaiian Airlines, United Airlines, Japan Coast Guard, Japan Air Self-Defense Force, Ministry of Land, Infrastructure and Transport
- Release date: August 26, 2010 (Limited Edition), September 27, 2010 (Regular)
- Features the new D-Runway, new international terminal, and new control tower.
- In stage 4, there is heavy fog around the airport which forces all runways except 34R to be shut down for 30 minutes.

=== ExtendScenario 2 (expansion pack) ===
- Airport: Sendai Airport, New Chitose Airport
- Airlines: Japan Airlines (both airports), All Nippon Airways (both airports), Hokkaido International Airlines (both airports), Ibex Airlines (both airports), EVA Air (Sendai), Aviation University (Sendai), Asiana Airlines (Sendai), Cathay Pacific Airways (New Chitose), China Eastern Airlines (New Chitose), China Airlines (New Chitose), Japan Coast Guard (New Chitose), Japan Air Self-Defense Force (New Chitose), SAT Airlines (New Chitose), Skymark Airlines (New Chitose)
- Release date: October 18, 2010 (download only)

=== Kagoshima Islandline ===
- Airport: Kagoshima Airport, Yakushima Airport, Tanegashima Airport, Amami Airport, Kikai Airport, Tokunoshima Airport, Okinoerabu Airport, Yoron Airport
- Airlines: Japan Airlines, All Nippon Airways, Skymark Airlines, Oriental Air Bridge, Skynet Asia Airways, Nakanihon Air Service, China Airlines, China Eastern Airlines, Japan Coast Guard, Japan Air Self-Defense Force, Nippon Cargo Airlines
- Release date: December 17, 2010 (Limited Edition), January 21, 2011 (Regular)
- In stage 4, there are 2 planes doing touch-and-go (both planes) and simulation ILS training (plane 2).
- In stage 5, a typhoon approaches. Most planes going to the islands in the south return to Kagoshima because airports are closed.

=== Ibaraki Airshow ===
- Airport: Ibaraki Airport
- Airlines: Skymark Airlines, Asiana Airlines, Japan Coast Guard, Japan Air Self-Defense Force, United States Air Force, United States Navy
- Release date: March 24, 2011

=== Honolulu International Airport ===
- Airport: Honolulu International Airport
- Airlines: Japan Airlines, Hawaiian Airlines, United Airlines, China Airlines, UPS, Washin Air
- Release date: July 22, 2011 (Limited Edition)
- Second airport outside Japan
- Special feature: HCF Approach (takes over the job of Departure and Approach)
- Stage 1 is a fictional recreation of the last JAL 747-400 Flight to Honolulu on February 28, 2011

=== ExtendScenario 3 (expansion pack) ===
- Airport: Kansai Airport, Kagoshima Airport
- Airlines: Japan Airlines (both airports), All Nippon Airways (both airports), Skymark Airlines (both airports), China Eastern Airlines (Kansai), Asiana Airlines (Kansai), EVA Air (Kansai), Cathay Pacific Airways (Kansai), Thai Airways International (Kansai), Garuda Indonesia (Kansai), Air France (Kansai), Finnair (Kansai), United Airlines (Kansai), Solaseed Airlines (previously known as Skynet Asia Airways and rebranded in July 2011, new livery appearance in Kagoshima), Nakanihon Air Service (Kagoshima), Japan Marine Force (Kagoshima)
- Release date: September 26, 2011 (download only)

=== Narita World Wings ===
- Airport: Narita International Airport
- Airlines:Japan Airlines Cargo, American Airlines, Japan Express, Japan Airlines, Skymark Airlines, IBEX Airlines, Air Canada, Aeroméxico, China Eastern Airlines, Asiana Airlines, EVA Air, China Airlines, Cathay Pacific Airways, Thai Airways International, Garuda Indonesia, Air France, Finnair, United Airlines, Philippine Airlines, China Cargo Airlines, Nippon Cargo Airlines, United Parcel Services (UPS)
- Release date: December 22, 2011 (Deluxe Edition), January 20, 2012 (Regular)
- First Appearance of the Airbus A380-800 in the game

=== ExtendScenario 4 (expansion pack) ===
- Airport: Kai Tak Airport, New Chitose Airport
- Airlines: Japan Airlines (both airports), All Nippon Airways (both airports), Skymark Airlines (New Chitose), China Eastern Airlines (both airports), EVA Air (Kai Tak), China Airlines (New Chitose), Cathay Pacific Airways (both airports), Dragonair (Kai Tak), Garuda Indonesia (Kai Tak), Air France (Kai Tak), Air Hong Kong (Kai Tak), United Airlines (Kansai), IBEX Airlines (New Chitose), Japan Coast Guard (New Chitose), Japan Air Self-Defense Force (New Chitose), Hokkaido International Airlines (New Chitose), Hokkaido Air System (New Chitose)
- Release date: January 26, 2012 (download only)
- Added international terminal and gates to New Chitose Airport

=== ExtendScenario 5 (expansion pack) ===
- Airport: Naha Airport, Ibaraki Airport
- Airlines: Japan Transocean Air (Naha), All Nippon Airways (Naha), Skymark Airlines (both airports), China Eastern Airlines (Naha), China Airlines (Naha), Asiana Airlines (Ibaraki), Japan Coast Guard (Ibaraki), Japan Air Self-Defense Force (Ibaraki), United States Air Force (Ibaraki), United States Navy (Ibaraki), Ryukyu Air Commuter (Naha)
- Release date: March 12, 2012 (download only)
- Cargo terminal and stands for aircraft parking are moved to northern part of the airport. International terminal expands and takes over the previous cargo terminal area

=== ANA 787 Edition ===
- Airport: Tokyo International Airport
- Airlines: All Nippon Airways
- Release date: April 27, 2012
- Boeing 787 has its first appearance in this episode.
- JAL has been replaced with generic colour name (Red).
- Apart from the two conventional stages, there are also 2 mini-games - directing the pilot to a gate parking and controlling the ground vehicle to move planes around (similar to those in ATC2).

=== Narita Night Wings ===
- Airport: Narita International Airport
- Airlines: Japan Airlines, Skymark Airlines, IBEX Airlines, Aeroméxico, China Eastern Airlines, Asiana Airlines, EVA Air, China Air, Cathay Pacific Airways, Thai Airways International, Garuda Indonesia, Air France, Finnair, United Airlines, Philippine Airlines, China Cargo Airlines, Nippon Cargo Airlines, United Parcel Services (UPS), China Airlines Cargo, Cathay Pacific Cargo airlines, All Nippon Airways
- Release date: June 22, 2012 (Limited Edition), July 20, 2012 (Regular)
- Night version of Narita World Wings

=== JAL Edition ===
- Airport: Tokyo International Airport
- Airlines: Japan Airways
- Release date: October 11, 2012 (Limited Edition), November 10, 2012 (Regular)
- Apart from the two conventional stages, there are also 2 mini-games which are different from those appeared before - parking a Boeing 787 at a spot and directing a jet bridge to that parked plane.

=== ExtendScenario 6 (expansion pack) ===
- Airport: Tokyo International Airport (Dream Gateway), Kagoshima Airport
- Release date: October 26, 2012 (download only)
- This package provides 4 stages for each airport. Dedicated for beginners, all stages are very easy.

=== ExtendScenario 7 (expansion pack) ===
- Airport: Tokyo International Airport (Dream Gateway), Kagoshima Airport
- Release date: November 29, 2012 (download only)
- This package provides 3 stages for each airport. Dedicated for experts, all stages are very difficult.

=== Chubu Centrair International Airport ===
- Airport: Chūbu Centrair International Airport
- Airlines: Japan Airlines, Skymark Airlines, IBEX Airlines, All Nippon Airways, China Airlines, Nippon Cargo Airlines, EVA Airways, United Airlines, Thai Airways International, Cathay Pacific Airways, Finnair, Philippine Airlines, Asiana Airlines
- Release date: November 16, 2012 (Limited Edition), December 21, 2012 (Regular)
