= List of airports in Japan =

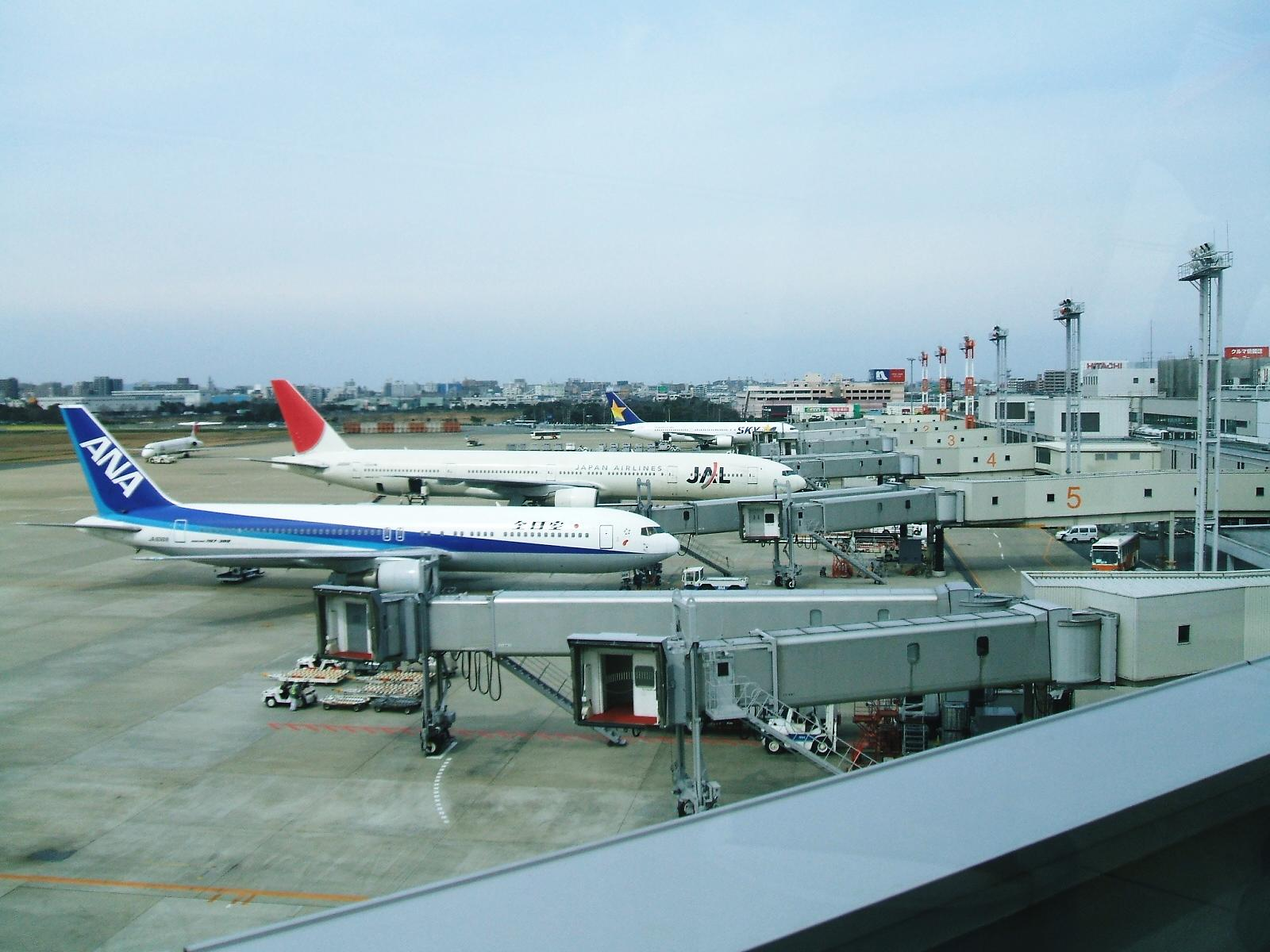
Aircraft at Terminal 3 of Fukuoka Airport

This is a list of airports in Japan, grouped by classification and sorted by location. As of February 2012, the country has a total of 98 airports, of which 28 are operated by the central government and 67 by local governments.

== Airport classifications ==
In Japan, airports serving civil aviation routes are governed by the Aeronautical Law for safety purposes, by the Noise Prevention Law for noise prevention purposes and by the Airport Act for economic development purposes. The latter law groups such airports into four legal classifications:

- Hub/First Class airports (拠点空港) serve a hub role in domestic or international transportation. They are subdivided into privately managed airports (the three largest international airports), national airports (run by the central government) and special regional airports (hubs run by prefectural or municipal governments).
- Regional/Second Class airports (地方管理空港) are other prefectural/municipal airports that the central government deems important to national aviation.
- Joint-use/Third Class airports (共用空港) are those shared between civil aviation and the Japan Self-Defense Forces.
- Other airports (その他の空港) fall outside the above categories.

Some airports in Japan do not fall under the scope of the Japanese airport statutes. These include the three major U.S. military air bases in Japan (Kadena Air Base, MCAS Iwakuni and Yokota Air Base) and certain smaller aerodromes for firefighting, corporate or other special purposes. In 2001, the Ministry of Agriculture, Forestry and Fisheries, which receives 20% of the public-works construction budget, commenced a scheme to build airfields predominantly for airlifting vegetables. Kasaoka Airfield was one of nine airfields constructed; however it was later determined that flying vegetables to Okayama from Kasaoka took just as long due to loading and unloading, and cost approximately six times as much as road transport.

== Airports ==
Airport name	Municipality	Prefecture	Island	ICAO	IATA	Classification	Notes	Coordinates
Fukuoka Airport	Fukuoka	Fukuoka	Kyushu	RJFF	FUK	First-class	Airport has scheduled airline services	33°35′04″N 130°27′06″E
Kansai International Airport	Izumisano / Tajiri / Sennan	Osaka	Honshu	RJBB	KIX	First-class	Airport has scheduled airline services	34°26′03″N 135°13′58″E
Narita International Airport	Narita	Chiba	Honshu	RJAA	NRT	First-class	Also known as Tokyo Narita Airport; Airport has scheduled airline services	35°45′53″N 140°23′11″E
Chubu Centrair International Airport	Tokoname	Aichi	Honshu	RJGG	NGO	First-class	Airport has scheduled airline services	34°51′30″N 136°48′19″E
Tokyo International Airport	Ōta	Tokyo	Honshu	RJTT	HND	First-class	Also known as Tokyo Haneda Airport; Airport has scheduled airline services	35°33′12″N 139°46′52″E
Osaka International Airport	Toyonaka / Ikeda / Itami	Osaka / Hyōgo	Honshu	RJOO	ITM	First-class	Also known as Itami Airport; Airport has scheduled airline services	34°47′04″N 135°26′21″E
Akita Airport	Akita	Akita	Honshu	RJSK	AXT	Second-class	Airport has scheduled airline services	39°36′56″N 140°13′07″E
Asahikawa Airport	Asahikawa	Hokkaido	Hokkaido	RJEC	AKJ	Second-class	Airport has scheduled airline services	43°40′15″N 142°26′51″E
New Chitose Airport	Chitose	Hokkaido	Hokkaido	RJCC	CTS	Second-class	Airport has scheduled airline services	42°46′31″N 141°41′33″E
Hakodate Airport	Hakodate	Hokkaido	Hokkaido	RJCH	HKD	Second-class	Airport has scheduled airline services	41°46′12″N 140°49′19″E
Hiroshima Airport	Mihara	Hiroshima	Honshu	RJOA	HIJ	Second-class	Airport has scheduled airline services	34°26′10″N 132°55′10″E
Kagoshima Airport	Kirishima	Kagoshima	Kyushu	RJFK	KOJ	Second-class	Airport has scheduled airline services	31°48′12″N 130°43′01″E
Kitakyushu Airport	Kitakyushu	Fukuoka	Kyushu	RJFR	KKJ	Second-class	Also known as Kokuraminami Airport; Airport has scheduled airline services	33°50′44″N 131°02′06″E
Kōchi Airport	Nankoku	Kōchi	Shikoku	RJOK	KCZ	Second-class	Also known as Kōchi Ryōma Airport; Airport has scheduled airline services	33°32′46″N 133°40′10″E
Kushiro Airport	Kushiro	Hokkaido	Hokkaido	RJCK	KUH	Second-class	Airport has scheduled airline services	43°02′27″N 144°11′35″E
Kumamoto Airport	Mashiki	Kumamoto	Kyushu	RJFT	KMJ	Second-class	Airport has scheduled airline services	32°50′14″N 130°51′19″E
Matsuyama Airport	Matsuyama	Ehime	Shikoku	RJOM	MYJ	Second-class	Airport has scheduled airline services	33°49′38″N 132°41′59″E
Miyazaki Airport	Miyazaki	Miyazaki	Kyushu	RJFM	KMI	Second-class	Airport has scheduled airline services	31°52′38″N 131°26′55″E
Nagasaki Airport	Ōmura	Nagasaki	Kyushu	RJFU	NGS	Second-class	Airport has scheduled airline services	32°55′01″N 129°54′49″E
Naha Airport/Naha Air Base	Naha	Okinawa	Okinawa	ROAH	OKA	Second-class	Airport has scheduled airline services	26°11′45″N 127°38′45″E
Niigata Airport	Niigata	Niigata	Honshu	RJSN	KIJ	Second-class	Airport has scheduled airline services	37°57′21″N 139°06′42″E
Oita Airport	Kunisaki	Ōita	Kyushu	RJFO	OIT	Second-class	Airport has scheduled airline services	33°28′46″N 131°44′14″E
Sendai Airport	Natori	Miyagi	Honshu	RJSS	SDJ	Second-class	Airport has scheduled airline services	38°08′23″N 140°55′01″E
Takamatsu Airport	Takamatsu	Kagawa	Shikoku	RJOT	TAK	Second-class	Airport has scheduled airline services	34°12′51″N 134°00′56″E
Tokachi–Obihiro Airport	Obihiro	Hokkaido	Hokkaido	RJCB	OBO	Second-class	Also known as Obihiro Airport; Airport has scheduled airline services	42°44′00″N 143°13′02″E
Wakkanai Airport	Wakkanai	Hokkaido	Hokkaido	RJCW	WKJ	Second-class	Airport has scheduled airline services	45°24′15″N 141°48′03″E
Yamaguchi Ube Airport	Ube	Yamaguchi	Honshu	RJDC	UBJ	Second-class	Airport has scheduled airline services	33°55′48″N 131°16′43″E
Yao Airport	Yao	Osaka	Honshu	RJOY		Second-class		34°35′48″N 135°36′02″E
Yamagata Airport	Higashine	Yamagata	Honshu	RJSC	GAJ	Second-class	Airport has scheduled airline services	38°24′43″N 140°22′16″E
Aguni Airport	Aguni	Okinawa	Aguni	RORA	AGJ	Third-class		26°35′34″N 127°14′25″E
Amami Airport	Amami	Kagoshima	Amami Ōshima	RJKA	ASJ	Third-class	Airport has scheduled airline services	28°25′51″N 129°42′45″E
Aomori Airport	Aomori	Aomori	Honshu	RJSA	AOJ	Third-class	Airport has scheduled airline services	40°44′00″N 140°41′19″E
Fukue Airport	Gotō	Nagasaki	Fukue	RJFE	FUJ	Third-class	Airport has scheduled airline services	32°39′58″N 128°49′58″E
Fukui Airport	Sakai	Fukui	Honshu	RJNF	FKJ	Third-class		36°08′34″N 136°13′26″E
Fukushima Airport	Tamakawa	Fukushima	Honshu	RJSF	FKS	Third-class	Airport has scheduled airline services	37°13′39″N 140°25′41″E
Hachijojima Airport	Hachijō	Tokyo	Hachijōjima	RJTH	HAC	Third-class	Airport has scheduled airline services	33°06′54″N 139°47′09″E
Hanamaki Airport	Hanamaki	Iwate	Honshu	RJSI	HNA	Third-class	Also known as Iwate Hanamaki Airport; Airport has scheduled airline services	39°25′43″N 141°08′07″E
Hateruma Airport	Taketomi	Okinawa	Hateruma	RORH	HTR	Third-class		24°03′30″N 123°48′14″E
Iejima Airport	Ie	Okinawa	Iejima	RORE	IEJ	Third-class		26°43′21″N 127°47′13″E
Iki Airport	Iki	Nagasaki	Iki	RJDB	IKI	Third-class	Airport has scheduled airline services	33°44′57″N 129°47′09″E
New Ishigaki Airport	Ishigaki	Okinawa	Ishigaki	ROIG	ISG	Third-class	Also known as Painushima Ishigaki Airport; Airport has scheduled airline services	24°23′47″N 124°14′42″E
Iwami Airport	Masuda	Shimane	Honshu	RJOW	IWJ	Third-class	Also known as Hagi-Iwami Airport; Airport has scheduled airline services	34°40′35″N 131°47′25″E
Izumo Airport	Izumo	Shimane	Honshu	RJOC	IZO	Third-class	Airport has scheduled airline services	35°24′49″N 132°53′24″E
Kamigotō Airport	Shin-Kamigotō	Nagasaki	Kyushu	RJDK		Third-class		33°00′49″N 129°11′33″E
Kerama Airport	Zamami	Okinawa	Fukaji	ROKR	KJP	Third-class		26°10′06″N 127°17′36″E
Kikai Airport	Kikai	Kagoshima	Kikaijima	RJKI	KKX	Third-class	Also known as Kikaiga Shima Airport; Airport has scheduled airline services	28°19′17″N 129°55′41″E
Kitadaito Airport	Kitadaitō	Okinawa	Kitadaitōjima	RORK	KTD	Third-class	Airport has scheduled airline services	25°56′41″N 131°19′37″E
Kobe Airport	Kobe	Hyōgo	Honshu	RJBE	UKB	Third-class	Airport has scheduled airline services	34°37′58″N 135°13′26″E
Kōzushima Airport	Kōzushima	Tokyo	Kōzushima	RJAZ		Third-class	Airport has scheduled airline services	34°11′22″N 139°08′01″E
Kumejima Airport	Kumejima	Okinawa	Kume	ROKJ	UEO	Third-class	Airport has scheduled airline services	26°21′49″N 126°42′50″E
Matsumoto Airport	Matsumoto	Nagano	Honshu	RJAF	MMJ	Third-class	Airport has scheduled airline services	36°10′00″N 137°55′22″E
Memanbetsu Airport	Ōzora	Hokkaido	Hokkaido	RJCM	MMB	Third-class	Airport has scheduled airline services	43°52′50″N 144°09′51″E
Minamidaito Airport	Minamidaitō	Okinawa	Minamidaitōjima	ROMD	MMD	Third-class	Also known as New Minamidaito Airport; Airport has scheduled airline services	25°50′48″N 131°15′49″E
Miyakejima Airport	Miyake	Tokyo	Miyakejima	RJTQ	MYE	Third-class	Airport has scheduled airline services	34°04′25″N 139°33′37″E
Miyako Airport	Miyakojima	Okinawa	Miyakojima	ROMY	MMY	Third-class	Airport has scheduled airline services	24°46′58″N 125°17′42″E
Monbetsu Airport	Monbetsu	Hokkaido	Hokkaido	RJEB	MBE	Third-class	Also known as Okhotsk-Monbetsu Airport; Airport has scheduled airline services	44°18′15″N 143°24′15″E
Nemuro Nakashibetsu Airport	Nakashibetsu	Hokkaido	Hokkaido	RJCN	SHB	Third-class	Airport has scheduled airline services	43°34′39″N 144°57′36″E
Nanki–Shirahama Airport	Shirahama	Wakayama	Honshu	RJBD	SHM	Third-class	Airport has scheduled airline services	33°39′44″N 135°21′52″E
Niijima Airport	Niijima	Tokyo	Niijima	RJAN		Third-class	Airport has scheduled airline services	34°22′01″N 139°16′07″E
Noto Airport	Wajima	Ishikawa	Honshu	RJNW	NTQ	Third-class	Also known as Noto Satoyama Airport; Airport has scheduled airline services	37°17′36″N 136°57′44″E
Odate–Noshiro Airport	Kitaakita	Akita	Honshu	RJSR	ONJ	Third-class	Airport has scheduled airline services	40°11′31″N 140°22′18″E
Ojika Airport	Ojika	Nagasaki	Ojika	RJDO		Third-class	Also known as Nagasaki Ojika Airport	33°11′27″N 129°05′25″E
Okayama Airport	Okayama	Okayama	Honshu	RJOB	OKJ	Third-class	Also known as Okayama Momotaro Airport; Airport has scheduled airline services	34°45′25″N 133°51′19″E
Oki Airport	Okinoshima	Shimane	Dōgojima	RJNO	OKI	Third-class	Airport has scheduled airline services	36°10′42″N 133°19′24″E
Okinoerabu Airport	Wadomari	Kagoshima	Okinoerabujima	RJKB	OKE	Third-class	Airport has scheduled airline services	27°25′54″N 128°42′20″E
Okushiri Airport	Okushiri	Hokkaido	Okushiri	RJEO	OIR	Third-class	Airport has scheduled airline services	42°04′18″N 139°25′58″E
Oshima Airport	Ōshima	Tokyo	Izu Ōshima	RJTO	OIM	Third-class	Airport has scheduled airline services	34°46′55″N 139°21′37″E
Rebun Airport (closed)	Rebun	Hokkaido	Rebun	RJCR	RBJ	Third-class		45°27′18″N 141°02′21″E
Rishiri Airport	Rishirifuji	Hokkaido	Rishiri	RJER	RIS	Third-class	Airport has scheduled airline services	45°14′31″N 141°11′15″E
Sado Airport	Sado	Niigata	Sado	RJSD	SDS	Third-class		38°03′40″N 138°24′51″E
Saga Airport	Saga	Saga	Kyushu	RJFS	HSG	Third-class	Also known as Kyushu Saga International Airport; Airport has scheduled airline services	33°08′59″N 130°18′08″E
Shizuoka Airport	Makinohara / Shimada	Shizuoka	Honshu	RJNS	FSZ	Third-class	Also known as Mt. Fuji Shizuoka Airport; Airport has scheduled airline services	34°47′46″N 138°11′22″E
Shimojishima Airport	Miyakojima	Okinawa	Shimojishima	RORS	SHI	Third-class	Airport has scheduled airline services	24°49′36″N 125°08′41″E
Shonai Airport	Sakata	Yamagata	Honshu	RJSY	SYO	Third-class	Airport has scheduled airline services	38°48′44″N 139°47′14″E
New Tanegashima Airport	Nakatane	Kagoshima	Tanegashima	RJFG	TNE	Third-class	Airport has scheduled airline services	30°36′18″N 130°59′30″E
Tarama Airport	Tarama	Okinawa	Tarama	RORT	TRA	Third-class	Airport has scheduled airline services	24°39′14″N 124°40′31″E
Tokunoshima Airport	Tokunoshima	Kagoshima	Tokunoshima	RJKN	TKN	Third-class	Airport has scheduled airline services	27°50′11″N 128°52′53″E
Tottori Airport	Tottori	Tottori	Honshu	RJOR	TTJ	Third-class	Airport has scheduled airline services	35°31′48″N 134°09′45″E
Toyama Airport	Toyama	Toyama	Honshu	RJNT	TOY	Third-class	Airport has scheduled airline services	36°38′54″N 137°11′15″E
Tsushima Airport	Tsushima	Nagasaki	Tsushima	RJDT	TSJ	Third-class	Airport has scheduled airline services	34°17′06″N 129°19′50″E
Yakushima Airport	Yakushima	Kagoshima	Yakushima	RJFC	KUM	Third-class	Airport has scheduled airline services	30°23′08″N 130°39′33″E
Yonaguni Airport	Yonaguni	Okinawa	Yonaguni	ROYN	OGN	Third-class	Airport has scheduled airline services	24°28′03″N 122°58′47″E
Yoron Airport	Yoron	Kagoshima	Yoronjima	RORY	RNJ	Third-class	Airport has scheduled airline services	27°02′38″N 128°24′06″E
Amakusa Airfield	Amakusa	Kumamoto	Kyushu	RJDA	AXJ	Other	Airport has scheduled airline services	32°28′56″N 130°09′32″E
Chōfu Airport	Chōfu	Tokyo	Honshu	RJTF		Other	Airport has scheduled airline services	35°40′18″N 139°31′41″E
Honda Airport	Okegawa	Saitama	Honshu			Other	Private airport Also known as Okegawa Airport	35°58′21″N 139°31′42″E
Komatsu Airport	Komatsu	Ishikawa	Honshu	RJNK	KMQ	Other	Airport has scheduled airline services	36°23′38″N 136°24′27″E
Kōnan Airport	Okayama	Okayama	Honshu	RJBK		Other	Also known as Kounan Airport	34°35′29″N 133°56′00″E
Makurazaki Airfield	Makurazaki	Kagoshima	Kyushu			Other		31°15′45″N 130°21′31″E
Minami Torishima Airport	Ogasawara	Tokyo	Minamitorishima	RJAM	MUS	Other		24°17′23″N 153°58′45″E
Misawa Airport / Misawa Air Base	Misawa	Aomori	Honshu	RJSM	MSJ	Other	Combined civil airport and USAF base Airport has scheduled airline services	40°42′19″N 141°22′19″E
Nagoya Airfield	Nagoya	Aichi	Honshu	RJNA	NKM	Other	Combined civil airport and JASDF base Also known as Komaki Airport; Airport has scheduled airline services	35°15′18″N 136°55′28″E
Oitakenou Airport	Bungo-Ōno	Ōita	Kyushu	ROIT		Other		33°1′34″N 131°30′20″E
Okadama Airport	Sapporo	Hokkaido	Hokkaido	RJCO	OKD	Other	Also known as Sapporo Okadama Airport; Airport has scheduled airline services	43°07′03″N 141°22′53″E
Satsuma Iōjima Airport	Mishima	Kagoshima	Iōjima			Other		30°47′04″N 130°16′16″E
Tajima Airport	Toyooka	Hyōgo	Honshu	RJBT	TJH	Other	Airport has scheduled airline services	35°30′46″N 134°47′13″E
Tokushima Awaodori Airport	Matsushige	Tokushima	Shikoku	RJOS	TKS	Other	Airport has scheduled airline services	34°07′58″N 134°36′24″E
Yonago Kitaro Airport	Yonago	Tottori	Honshu	RJOH	YGJ	Other	Airport has scheduled airline services	35°29′32″N 133°14′11″E
Asahikawa Air Field	Asahikawa	Hokkaido	Hokkaido	RJCA		Military	JGSDF base	43°47′40″N 142°21′54″E
Ashiya Air Field	Ashiya	Fukuoka	Kyushu	RJFA		Military	JASDF base	33°52′53″N 130°39′06″E
Chitose Air Base	Chitose	Hokkaido	Hokkaido	RJCJ		Military	JASDF base	42°47′40″N 141°39′59″E
Gifu Air Field	Gifu	Gifu	Honshu	RJNG		Military	JASDF base	35°23′40″N 136°52′10″E
NAF Atsugi	Ayase	Kanagawa	Honshu	RJTA	NJA	Military	Shared US Navy / JMSDF base	35°27′17″N 139°27′00″E
Yokota Air Base	Fussa	Tokyo	Honshu	RJTY	OKO	Military	US Air Force base	35°44′55″N 139°20′55″E
MCAS Futenma	Ginowan	Okinawa	Okinawa	ROTM		Military	US Marine Corps base	26°16′15″N 127°44′53″E
Hachinohe Air Base	Hachinohe	Aomori	Honshu	RJSH		Military	JMSDF base	40°33′07″N 141°28′02″E
Hamamatsu Air Base	Hamamatsu	Shizuoka	Honshu	RJNH		Military	JASDF base	34°45′01″N 137°42′11″E
Hōfu Air Field	Hōfu	Yamaguchi	Honshu	RJOF		Military	JASDF base	34°02′04″N 131°32′47″E
Iruma Air Base	Iruma	Saitama	Honshu	RJTJ		Military	JASDF base	35°50′31″N 139°24′38″E
Akeno Air Field	Ise	Mie	Honshu	RJOE		Military	JGSDF base	34°32′00″N 136°40′20″E
MCAS Iwakuni	Iwakuni	Yamaguchi	Honshu	RJOI	IWK	Military	US Marine Corps base Civil airport known as Iwakuni Kintaikyo Airport; Airport has scheduled airline services	34°08′38″N 132°14′08″E
Metabaru Air Field	Kamimine	Saga	Kyushu	RJDM		Military	JGSDF base	33°19′31″N 130°24′49″E
Kanoya Air Field	Kanoya	Kagoshima	Kyushu	RJFY		Military	JMSDF base	31°22′05″N 130°50′17″E
Kasaoka Airfield	Kasaoka	Okayama	Honshu			Military		34°28′33″N 133°29′20″E
Kasumigaura Air Field	Kasumigaura	Ibaraki	Honshu	RJAK		Military	JGSDF base	36°02′05″N 140°11′34″E
Kisarazu Air Field	Kisarazu	Chiba	Honshu	RJTK		Military	JGSDF base	35°23′42″N 139°54′47″E
Matsushima Air Field	Matsushima	Miyagi	Honshu	RJST		Military	JASDF base	38°24′11″N 141°12′43″E
JMSDF Ōminato Base	Mutsu	Aomori	Honshu	RJSO		Military	JMSDF base	41°13′58″N 141°07′56″E
Tokachi Airfield	Obihiro	Hokkaido	Hokkaido	RJCT		Military	JGSF base Formerly Obihiro Airport, renamed on opening of Tokachi–Obihiro Airport	42°53′25″N 143°09′30″E
Central Field	Ogasawara	Tokyo	Iwo Jima	RJAW	IWO	Military	Also known as Iwo Jima Air Base; JMSDF base	24°47′03″N 141°19′21″E
Kadena Air Base	Okinawa	Okinawa	Okinawa	RODN	DNA	Military	USAF base	26°21′06″N 127°46′10″E
Ibaraki Airport	Omitama	Ibaraki	Honshu	RJAH	IBR	Military	Also known as Hyakuri Airfield; JASDF base Airport has scheduled airline services	36°10′54″N 140°24′53″E
Kasuminome Air Field	Sendai	Miyagi	Honshu	RJSU		Military	JGSDF base	38°14′08″N 140°55′23″E
Shimofusa Air Base	Narita	Chiba	Honshu	RJTL		Military	JMSDF base	35°47′56″N 140°00′44″E
Ozuki Air Field	Shimonoseki	Yamaguchi	Honshu	RJOZ		Military	JMSDF base	34°02′49″N 131°03′08″E
Nyutabaru Air Base	Shintomi	Miyazaki	Kyushu	RJFN		Military	JASDF base	32°05′01″N 131°27′05″E
Tachikawa Airfield	Tachikawa	Tokyo	Honshu	RJTC		Military		35°42′39″N 139°24′11″E
Tateyama Air Field	Tateyama	Chiba	Honshu	RJTE		Military	JMSDF base	34°59′15″N 139°49′55″E
Tsuiki Air Field	Chikujō	Fukuoka	Kyushu	RJFZ		Military	JASDF base	33°41′06″N 131°02′25″E
Utsunomiya Air Field	Utsunomiya	Tochigi	Honshu	RJTU		Military	JGSDF base	36°30′52″N 139°52′15″E
Shizuhama Air Base	Yaizu	Shizuoka	Honshu	RJNY		Military	JASDF base	34°48′46″N 138°17′53″E
Hiroshima–Nishi Airport	Hiroshima	Hiroshima	Honshu	~~RJBH~~	~~HIW~~	Closed		34°22′01″N 132°24′50″E
Ishigaki Airport	Ishigaki	Okinawa	Ishigaki	~~ROIG~~	~~ISG~~	Closed	Airport codes were reassigned, now used by New Ishigaki Airport	24°20′41″N 124°11′13″E
Kokura Airport	Kitakyushu	Fukuoka	Kyushu	~~RJFR~~	~~KKJ~~	Closed	Airport codes were reassigned, now used by Kitakyushu Airport	33°50′11″N 130°56′49″E
Kizugawa Airport	Osaka	Osaka	Honshu			Closed	Osaka's first airport began as seaplane base around 1923 and became a full airport in 1929. At the peak in 1938 handled 8,800 departures and arrivals and 10,000 passengers. Closed in 1938 when Itami Airport opened. Now airfield is in Funamachi industrial area and site of airport is simply marked with brief acknowledgement the former airfield in a park located under the ramps connected to Shin Kizugawa Bridge.	34°37′44.30″N 135°27′49.92″E
Teshikaga Airfield	Teshikaga	Hokkaido	Hokkaido			Closed		43°28′45″N 144°26′9″E
Yokosuka Naval Airfield	Yokosuka	Kanagawa	Honshu			Closed		35°19′27″N 139°38′53″E

== Heliports ==
Heliport name	City served	Prefecture	Island	ICAO	Operator	Pad data	Coordinates
Komatsushima Heliport	Komatsushima	Tokushima	Shikoku	RJOP	JMSDF	85 ft (26 m) AMSL, 250 m × 45 m (820 ft × 148 ft), asphalt concrete	34°00′19″N 134°37′35″E
Tokyo Heliport	Kōtō	Tokyo	Honshu	RJTI	Tokyo Metropolitan Government	16 ft (5 m) AMSL, 90 m × 30 m (295 ft × 98 ft), asphalt concrete	35°38′10″N 139°50′22″E
Soumagahara Heliport	Maebashi	Gunma	Honshu	RJTS	JSDF-G	1,306 ft (398 m) AMSL, 500 m × 30 m (1,640 ft × 98 ft), asphalt concrete	36°26′05″N 138°57′11″E
Maizuru Heliport	Maizuru	Kyoto	Honshu	RJBM	JMSDF	19 ft (6 m) AMSL, 400 m × 45 m (1,312 ft × 148 ft), asphalt concrete	35°29′25″N 135°22′38″E
Camp Zama Kastner Army Heliport	Zama	Kanagawa	Honshu	RJTR	US Army	367 ft (112 m) AMSL, 457 m × 16 m (1,499 ft × 52 ft), asphalt	35°30′49″N 139°23′37″E

== See also ==
- List of the busiest airports in Japan
- Japan Air Self-Defense Force (JASDF)
- Japan Ground Self-Defense Force (JGSDF)
- Japan Maritime Self-Defense Force (JMSDF)
- Transport in Japan
- List of airports by ICAO code: R#RJ RO – Japan
- Wikipedia:WikiProject Aviation/Airline destination lists: Asia#Japan
