= List of Japan Airlines destinations =

Japan Airlines is the flag carrier of Japan. As of 2026, it flies to over 70 destinations across three continents.

== Map ==
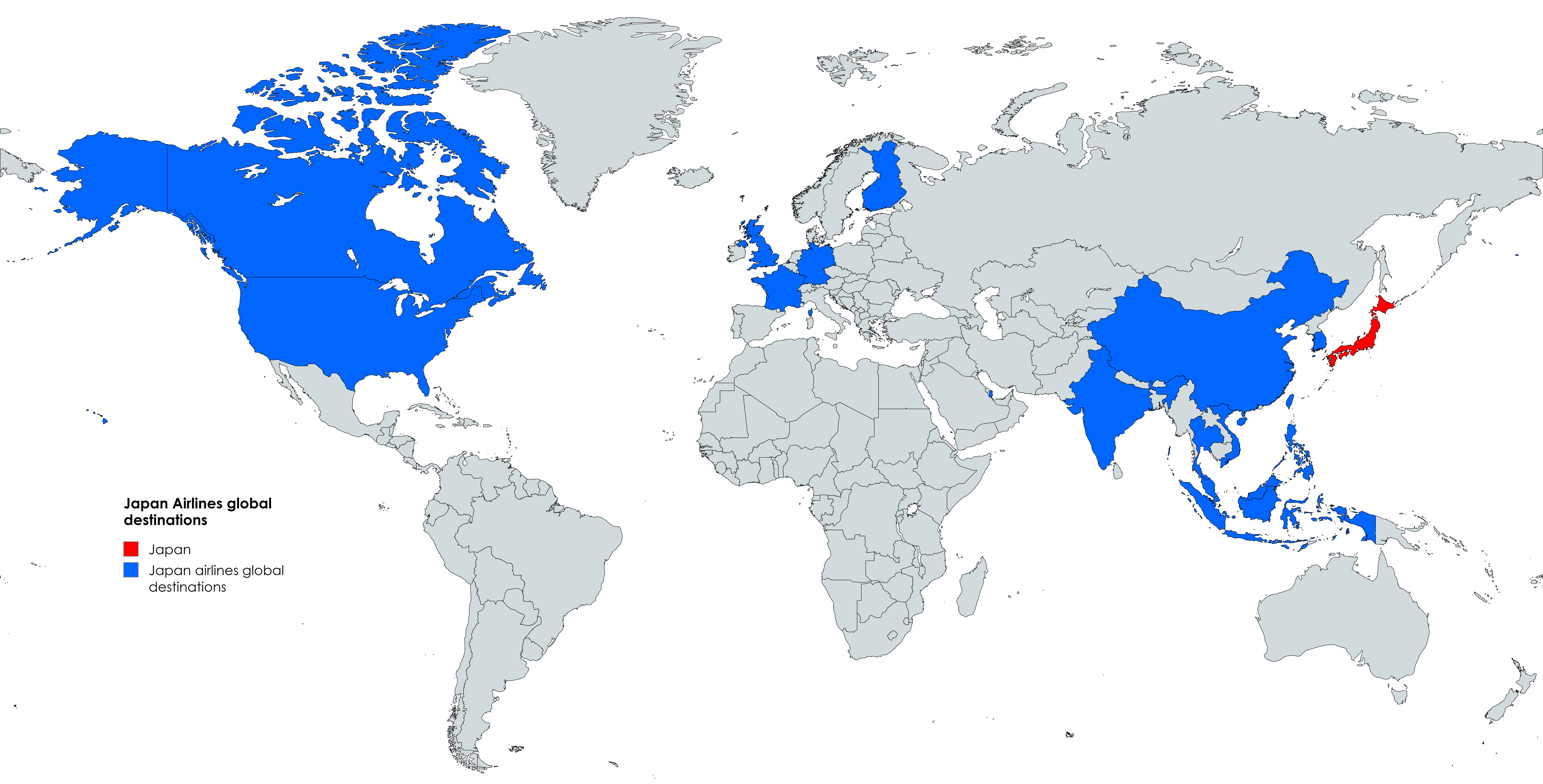

Map of the global destinations of Japan Airlines (in blue) and Japan (in red)

== Destinations ==
Country	City	Airport	Notes	Refs
Australia	Adelaide	Adelaide Airport	Terminated	
Australia	Brisbane	Brisbane Airport	Terminated	
Australia	Cairns	Cairns Airport	Terminated	
Australia	Melbourne	Melbourne Airport	Passenger	
Australia	Perth	Perth Airport	Terminated	
Australia	Sydney	Sydney Airport	Passenger	
Bahrain	Manama	Bahrain International Airport	Terminated	
Brazil	Belém	Val de Cans International Airport	Terminated	
Brazil	Rio de Janeiro	Rio de Janeiro/Galeão International Airport	Terminated	
Brazil	Campinas	Viracopos International Airport	Terminated	
Brazil	São Paulo	São Paulo/Guarulhos International Airport	Terminated	
Canada	Vancouver	Vancouver International Airport	Passenger	
China	Beijing	Beijing Capital International Airport	Passenger	
China	Dalian	Dalian Zhoushuizi International Airport	Passenger	
China	Guangzhou	Guangzhou Baiyun International Airport	Passenger	
China	Hangzhou	Hangzhou Xiaoshan International Airport	Terminated	
China	Qingdao	Qingdao Liuting International Airport	Airport closed	
China	Shanghai	Shanghai Hongqiao International Airport	Passenger	
China	Shanghai	Shanghai Pudong International Airport	Passenger + cargo	
China	Tianjin	Tianjin Binhai International Airport	Passenger + cargo	
China	Xiamen	Xiamen Gaoqi International Airport	Terminated	
China	Xi'an	Xi'an Xianyang International Airport	Terminated	
Denmark	Copenhagen	Copenhagen Airport	Terminated	
Egypt	Cairo	Cairo International Airport	Terminated	
Fiji	Nadi	Nadi International Airport	Terminated	
Finland	Helsinki	Helsinki Airport	Passenger	
France	Paris	Charles de Gaulle Airport	Passenger	
France	Paris	Orly Airport	Terminated	
Germany	Düsseldorf	Düsseldorf Airport	Terminated	
Germany	Frankfurt	Frankfurt Airport	Passenger	
Germany	Hamburg	Hamburg Airport	Terminated	
Greece	Athens	Ellinikon International Airport	Airport closed	
Guam	Hagåtña	Antonio B. Won Pat International Airport	Passenger	
Hong Kong	Hong Kong	Hong Kong International Airport	Passenger + cargo	
Hong Kong	Hong Kong	Kai Tak Airport	Airport closed	
Iceland	Reykjavík	Keflavík International Airport	Terminated	
India	Bangalore	Kempegowda International Airport	Passenger	
India	Delhi	Indira Gandhi International Airport	Passenger	
India	Kolkata	Netaji Subhas Chandra Bose International Airport	Terminated	
India	Mumbai	Chhatrapati Shivaji Maharaj International Airport	Terminated	
Indonesia	Denpasar	Ngurah Rai International Airport	Terminated	
Indonesia	Jakarta	Soekarno–Hatta International Airport	Passenger	
Iran	Tehran	Mehrabad International Airport	Terminated	
Italy	Milan	Milan Malpensa Airport	Terminated	
Italy	Rome	Rome Fiumicino Airport	Terminated	
Japan	Akita	Akita Airport	Passenger	
Japan	Amami Ōshima	Amami Airport	Passenger	
Japan	Aomori	Aomori Airport	Passenger	
Japan	Asahikawa	Asahikawa Airport	Passenger	
Japan	Fukuoka	Fukuoka Airport	Focus city	
Japan	Hakodate	Hakodate Airport	Passenger	
Japan	Hanamaki	Hanamaki Airport	Passenger	
Japan	Hiroshima	Hiroshima Airport	Passenger	
Japan	Iwakuni	Iwakuni Kintaikyo Airport	Terminated	
Japan	Izumo	Izumo Airport	Passenger	
Japan	Kagoshima	Kagoshima Airport	Passenger	
Japan	Kitakyushu	Kitakyushu Airport	Passenger	
Japan	Kobe	Kobe Airport	Terminated	
Japan	Kōchi	Kochi Airport	Passenger	
Japan	Komatsu	Komatsu Airport	Passenger	
Japan	Kumamoto	Kumamoto Airport	Passenger	
Japan	Kushiro	Kushiro Airport	Passenger	
Japan	Matsuyama	Matsuyama Airport	Passenger	
Japan	Misawa	Misawa Airport	Passenger	
Japan	Miyazaki	Miyazaki Airport	Passenger	
Japan	Nagasaki	Nagasaki Airport	Passenger	
Japan	Nagoya	Chubu Centrair International Airport	Focus city	
Japan	Nagoya	Nagoya Komaki Airport	Terminated	
Japan	Naha	Naha Airport	Focus city	
Japan	Niigata	Niigata Airport	Passenger	
Japan	Obihiro	Tokachi–Obihiro Airport	Passenger	
Japan	Ōita	Oita Airport	Passenger	
Japan	Okayama	Okayama Airport	Passenger	
Japan	Osaka	Kansai International Airport	Hub	
Japan	Osaka	Itami Airport	Hub	
Japan	Ōzora	Memanbetsu Airport	Passenger	
Japan	Sapporo	New Chitose Airport	Focus city	
Japan	Shirahama	Nanki Shirahama Airport	Passenger	
Japan	Shizuoka	Shizuoka Airport	Terminated	
Japan	Takamatsu	Takamatsu Airport	Passenger	
Japan	Tokunoshima	Tokunoshima Airport	Passenger	
Japan	Tokushima	Tokushima Airport	Passenger	
Japan	Tokyo	Haneda Airport	Hub	
Japan	Tokyo	Narita International Airport	Hub	
Japan	Yamagata	Yamagata Airport	Passenger	
Japan	Yamaguchi-Ube	Yamaguchi Ube Airport	Passenger	
Kuwait	Kuwait City	Kuwait International Airport	Terminated	
Lebanon	Beirut	Beirut–Rafic Hariri International Airport	Terminated	
Malaysia	Kuala Lumpur	Kuala Lumpur International Airport	Passenger	
Mexico	Mexico City	Mexico City International Airport	Terminated	
Myanmar	Yangon	Yangon International Airport	Terminated	
Netherlands	Amsterdam	Amsterdam Airport Schiphol	Terminated	
New Caledonia	Nouméa	La Tontouta International Airport	Terminated	
New Zealand	Auckland	Auckland Airport	Terminated	
Northern Mariana Islands	Saipan	Saipan International Airport	Terminated	
Pakistan	Karachi	Jinnah International Airport	Terminated	
Philippines	Cebu	Mactan–Cebu International Airport	Terminated	
Philippines	Manila	Ninoy Aquino International Airport	Passenger + cargo	
Qatar	Doha	Hamad International Airport	Passenger	
Russia	Khabarovsk	Khabarovsk Novy Airport	Terminated	
Russia	Moscow	Domodedovo International Airport	Terminated	
Russia	Moscow	Sheremetyevo International Airport	Terminated	
Russia	Vladivostok	Vladivostok International Airport	Terminated	
Singapore	Singapore	Changi Airport	Passenger	
South Korea	Busan	Gimhae International Airport	Terminated	
South Korea	Seoul	Gimpo International Airport	Passenger	
South Korea	Seoul	Incheon International Airport	Cargo	
Spain	Madrid	Adolfo Suárez Madrid–Barajas Airport	Terminated	
Saudi Arabia	Jeddah	King Abdulaziz International Airport	Terminated	
Switzerland	Zürich	Zürich Airport	Terminated	
Taiwan	Kaohsiung	Kaohsiung International Airport	Terminated	
Taiwan	Taipei	Songshan Airport	Passenger	
Taiwan	Taipei	Taoyuan International Airport	Passenger + cargo	
Thailand	Bangkok	Don Mueang International Airport	Terminated	
Thailand	Bangkok	Suvarnabhumi Airport	Passenger	
United Arab Emirates	Abu Dhabi	Zayed International Airport	Terminated	
United Kingdom	London	Heathrow Airport	Passenger	
United States	Anchorage	Ted Stevens Anchorage International Airport	Terminated	
United States	Atlanta	Hartsfield–Jackson Atlanta International Airport	Terminated	
United States	Boston	Logan International Airport	Passenger	
United States	Chicago	O'Hare International Airport	Passenger	
United States	Dallas	Dallas Fort Worth International Airport	Passenger	
United States	Honolulu	Daniel K. Inouye International Airport	Passenger	
United States	Las Vegas	Harry Reid International Airport	Terminated	
United States	Los Angeles	Los Angeles International Airport	Passenger	
United States	New Orleans	Louis Armstrong New Orleans International Airport	Terminated	
United States	New York City	John F. Kennedy International Airport	Passenger	
United States	San Diego	San Diego International Airport	Passenger	
United States	San Francisco	San Francisco International Airport	Passenger	
United States	Seattle	Seattle–Tacoma International Airport	Passenger	
United States	Wake Island	Wake Island Airfield	Terminated	
Venezuela	Caracas	Simón Bolívar International Airport	Terminated	
Vietnam	Hanoi	Noi Bai International Airport	Passenger	
Vietnam	Ho Chi Minh City	Tan Son Nhat International Airport	Passenger	
