= JAL Express =

Defunct low-cost airline of Japan (1997–2014)

JAL Express Co., Ltd. 株式会社ジャル エクスプレス Kabushiki-gaisha Jaru Ekusupuresu
IATA	ICAO	Call sign
JL	JEX	JANEX
- Founded: 1 April 1997 (as JEX)
- Commenced operations: 1 July 1998
- Ceased operations: 30 September 2014 (re-integrated into Japan Airlines)
- Hubs: Tokyo–Haneda
- Focus cities: Nagoya–Centrair
- Frequent-flyer program: JAL Mileage Bank
- Alliance: Oneworld (affiliate, 2007—2014)
- Parent company: Japan Airlines
- Headquarters: Ota-ku, Tokyo, Japan
- Key people: Shigemi Kurusu (President)

JAL Express (JEX) was an airline with its headquarters in Ota-ku, Tokyo, Japan, and its main hub at Haneda Airport. It also maintained offices in the Japan Airlines Building in Shinagawa, Tokyo. Its operations included scheduled and non-scheduled passenger services to eight regional destinations across Japan. It also served 15 additional destinations in Japan, and two in the People's Republic of China on behalf of Japan Airlines, under a wet-lease agreement.

JAL Express was a wholly owned subsidiary of Japan's flag carrier, Japan Airlines and an affiliate member of the Oneworld alliance. It was founded April 1, 1997, and began operations with a Boeing 737-400 on July 1, 1998. It celebrated its tenth anniversary and first flight in April 2007 and July 2008, respectively. It operated its first international flight in May 2009, and flew to Hangzhou and Shanghai. In the fiscal year ending March 31, 1999, JAL Express, together with its sister airlines within the JAL Group, carried over 32 million passengers and over 1.1 million tons of cargo and mail.

The carrier ended operations on 30 September 2014 after being fully integrated with Japan Airlines.

== History ==
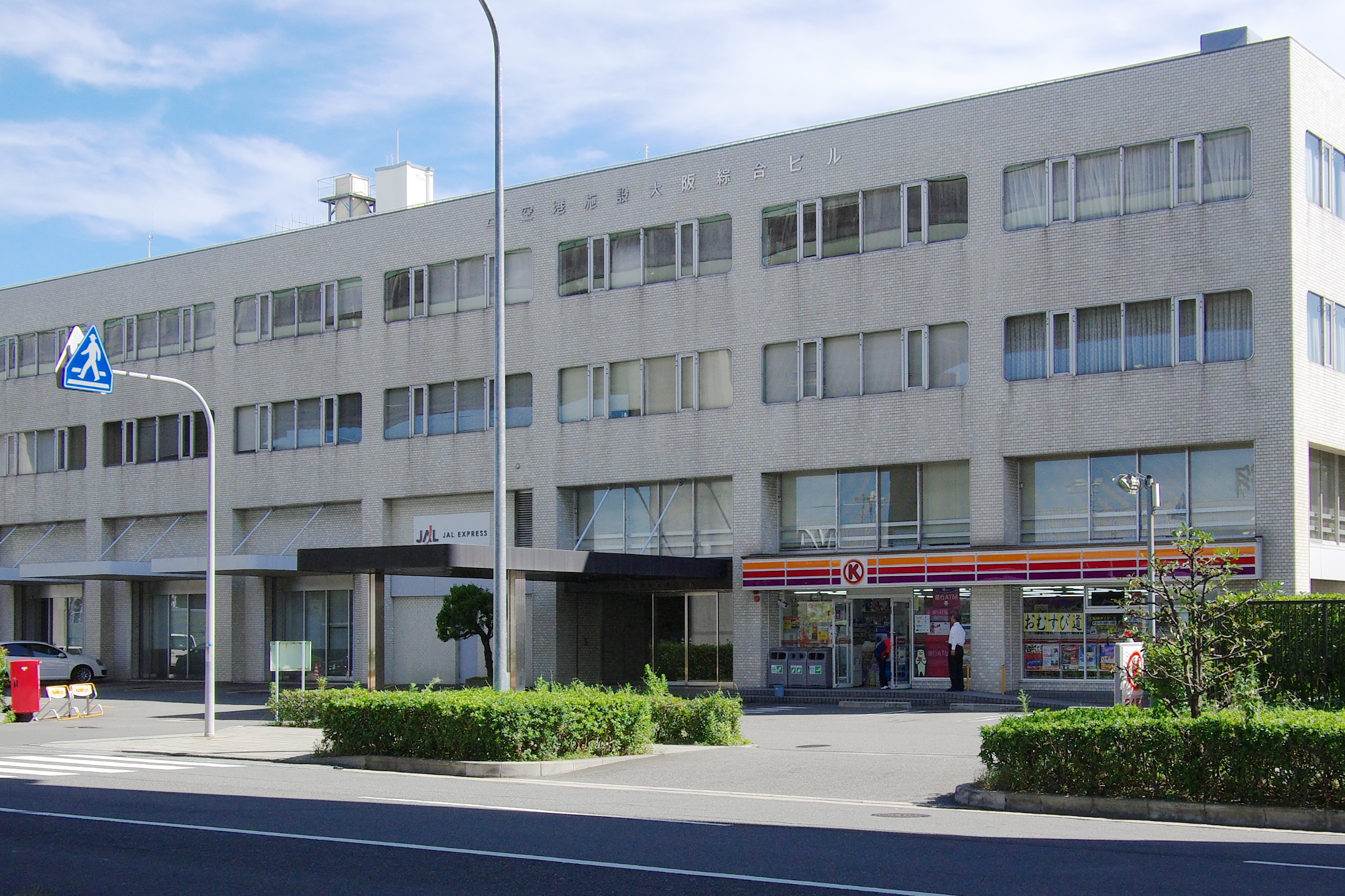
JAL Express former headquarters in Ikeda, Osaka which is now J-Air's headquarters.

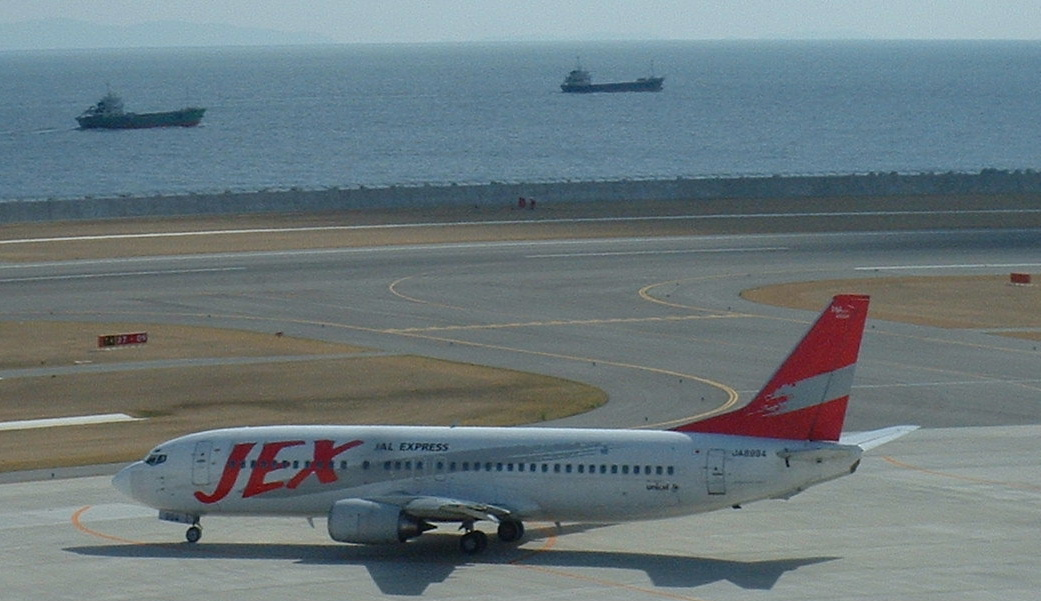
JAL Express Boeing 737-400 in old livery at Kobe Airport

JAL Express (JEX) was established on April 1, 1997 as a wholly owned domestic subsidiary airline of Japan Airlines (JAL), with initial capital of ¥5.8 million. It operated scheduled passenger services to regional domestic destinations in Japan, as well as some low-demand flights for JAL under wet-lease agreement. It was also considered for services on the domestic trunk and short-haul international routes. On July 1, 1998, JAL Express commenced operations from Osaka to Miyazaki and Kagoshima with two Boeing 737-400s, non-Japanese cockpit crew, and short-term contracted cabin attendants. The airline's cabin attendants, called Sky Cast, were responsible for cleaning the 150-seat cabin between flights.

The airline celebrated its one millionth passenger in June 2000 and commenced wet-lease operation for its parent JAL in December 2000. On 14 November 2002, JAL introduced a new aircraft livery design, "The Arc of the Sun", across the JAL Group fleet. A reception to celebrate the completion of the first aircraft with the new design was held at the JAS M2 hangar. In April 2005, the McDonnell Douglas MD-81 was introduced to the airline fleet, with an all Economy Class configuration with 163 seats. JAL Express became an affiliate member of Oneworld on April 1, 2007, together with four of its sister airlines, in the alliance's biggest expansion in its young history. On the same day, the airline celebrated its tenth anniversary of establishment.

JAL Express welcomed the arrival of the new Boeing 737-800 to its fleet in January 2008 and celebrated the tenth anniversary of its first flight in July 2008. It operated its first international flight in May 2009 under a wet-lease agreement with JAL.

On July 9, 2010, JAL Express pilot Ari Fuji became its first female airline flight captain.

As of March 27, 2011, all of JAL Express flights were being operated as JAL flights, until the full merger of the two carriers in September 2014.

== Destinations ==
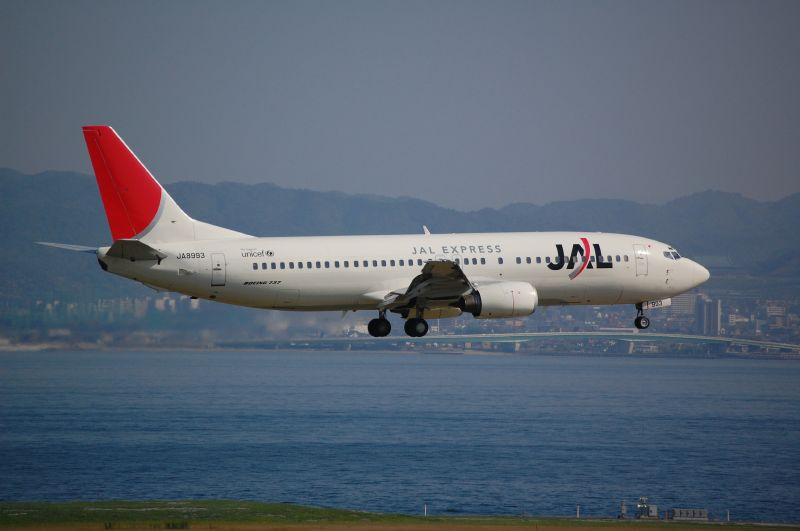
JAL Express Boeing 737-400 in "Arc of the Sun" livery

JAL Express operated to the following destinations:

Country	City	Airport	Notes	Refs
Scheduled Routes
Japan	Amami Ōshima	Amami Airport		
Japan	Hakodate	Hakodate Airport	Terminated	
Japan	Iwate-Hanamaki	Hanamaki Airport		
Japan	Kagoshima	Kagoshima Airport		
Japan	Kumamoto	Kumamoto Airport		
Japan	Miyazaki	Miyazaki Airport		
Japan	Nagoya	Chubu Centrair International Airport	Focus city	
Japan	Ōita	Ōita Airport	Terminated	
Japan	Osaka	Itami Airport	Hub	
Japan	Sendai	Sendai Airport		
Wet-leased Routes
China	Hangzhou	Hangzhou Xiaoshan International Airport		
China	Shanghai	Shanghai Pudong International Airport		
Japan	Akita	Akita Airport		
Japan	Amami Ōshima	Amami Airport		
Japan	Fukuoka	Fukuoka Airport		
Japan	Hiroshima	Hiroshima Airport		
Japan	Iwate-Hanamaki	Hanamaki Airport		
Japan	Izumo	Izumo Airport		
Japan	Kagoshima	Kagoshima Airport		
Japan	Kitakyushu	Kitakyushu Airport		
Japan	Kobe	Kobe Airport		
Japan	Kōchi	Kōchi Ryōma Airport		
Japan	Kumamoto	Kumamoto Airport		
Japan	Matsuyama	Matsuyama Airport		
Japan	Memanbetsu	Memanbetsu Airport		
Japan	Miyazaki	Miyazaki Airport		
Japan	Nagoya	Chubu Centrair International Airport		
Japan	Niigata	Niigata Airport		
Japan	Okayama	Naha Airport		
Japan	Okinawa	Niigata Airport		
Japan	Osaka	Kansai International Airport		
Japan	Osaka	Itami Airport		
Japan	Tokushima	Tokushima Airport		
Japan	Sapporo	New Chitose Airport		
Japan	Sendai	Sendai Airport		
Japan	Tokyo	Haneda Airport		
Japan	Tokyo	Narita International Airport		
Japan	Yamaguchiube	Yamaguchi Ube Airport		

== Fleet ==
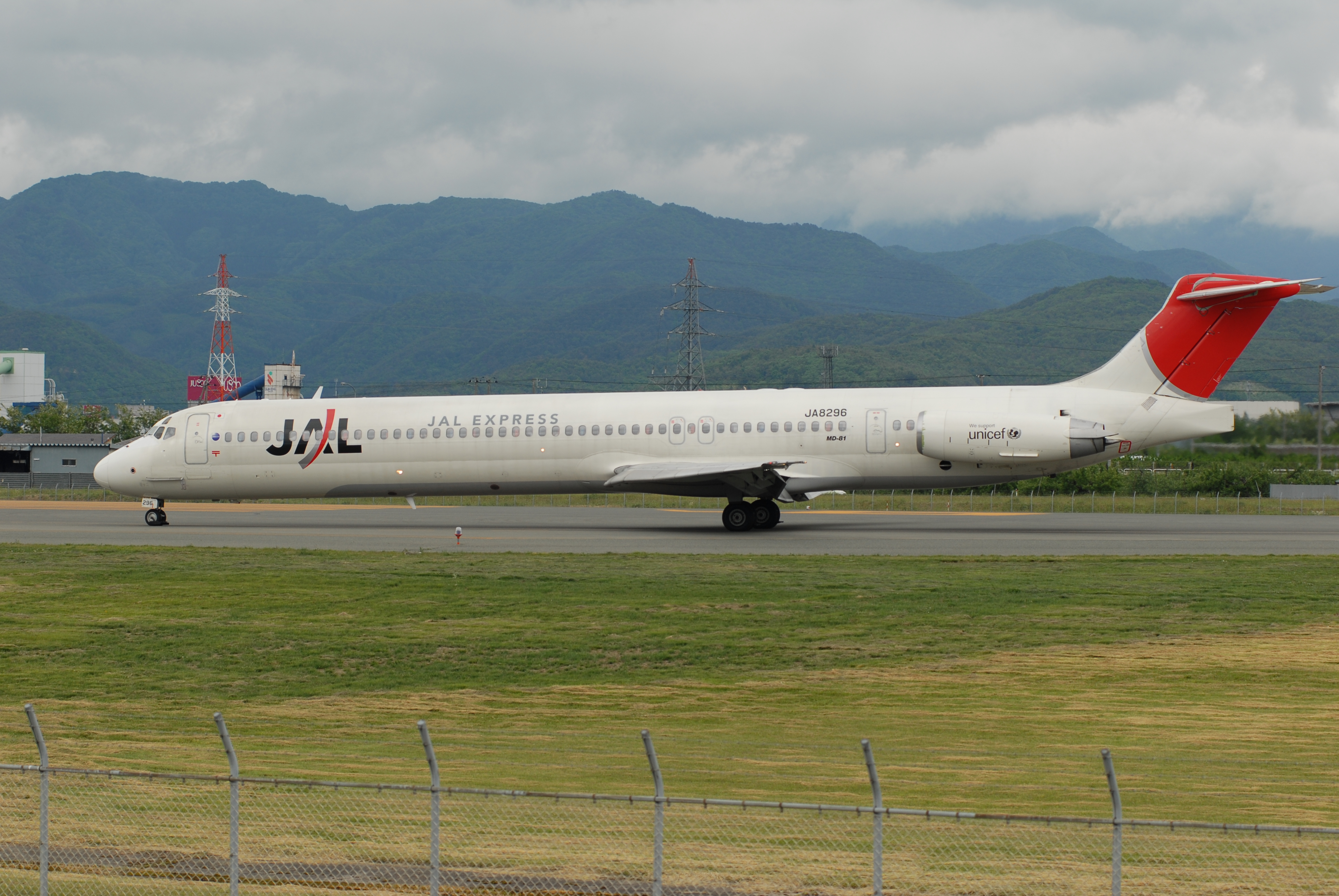
JAL Express operated the McDonnell Douglas MD-81 aircraft type (pictured) between 2005 and 2010

As of September 2013, JAL Express operated 42 narrow-body aircraft, with either two classes of service (class J and Economy class) or single class of service (Economy Class).

JAL Express fleet
Aircraft	In Service	Passengers		
Aircraft	In Service	C	Y	Total
Boeing 737-800	42	20	145	165

== Services ==
=== In-flight catering ===
Cold beverages (including Hajime Saori cooled-green tea, JAL Original citrus drink Sky Time and apple juice), hot beverages (including tea, green tea, coffee and consommé soup), JAL Original candy, and sugar candy were available on JAL Express flights. Passengers traveling in Class J could enjoy JAL Class J in-flight catering services. From March 27, 2011, passengers traveling in all classes could enjoy in-flight catering services on all flights.

=== In-flight entertainment ===
JAL Group's in-flight magazine, Skyward, JAL Express's in-flight magazine JEX Letter, and in-flight shopping magazine JALSHOP were available on board. No newspaper or audio or video programs were available. Class J passengers could enjoy JAL Class J in-flight entertainment services where available. After March 27, 2011, passengers in all classes could enjoy in-flight entertainment services on all of flights.

== See also ==
- Air transport in Japan
- List of airports in Japan
- List of Japanese companies
- Transport in Japan
