= Japan Air Commuter =

Regional airline of Japan

Japan Air Commuter Co., Ltd. 日本エアコミューター株式会社 Nihon Ea Komyūtā Kabushiki-gaisha

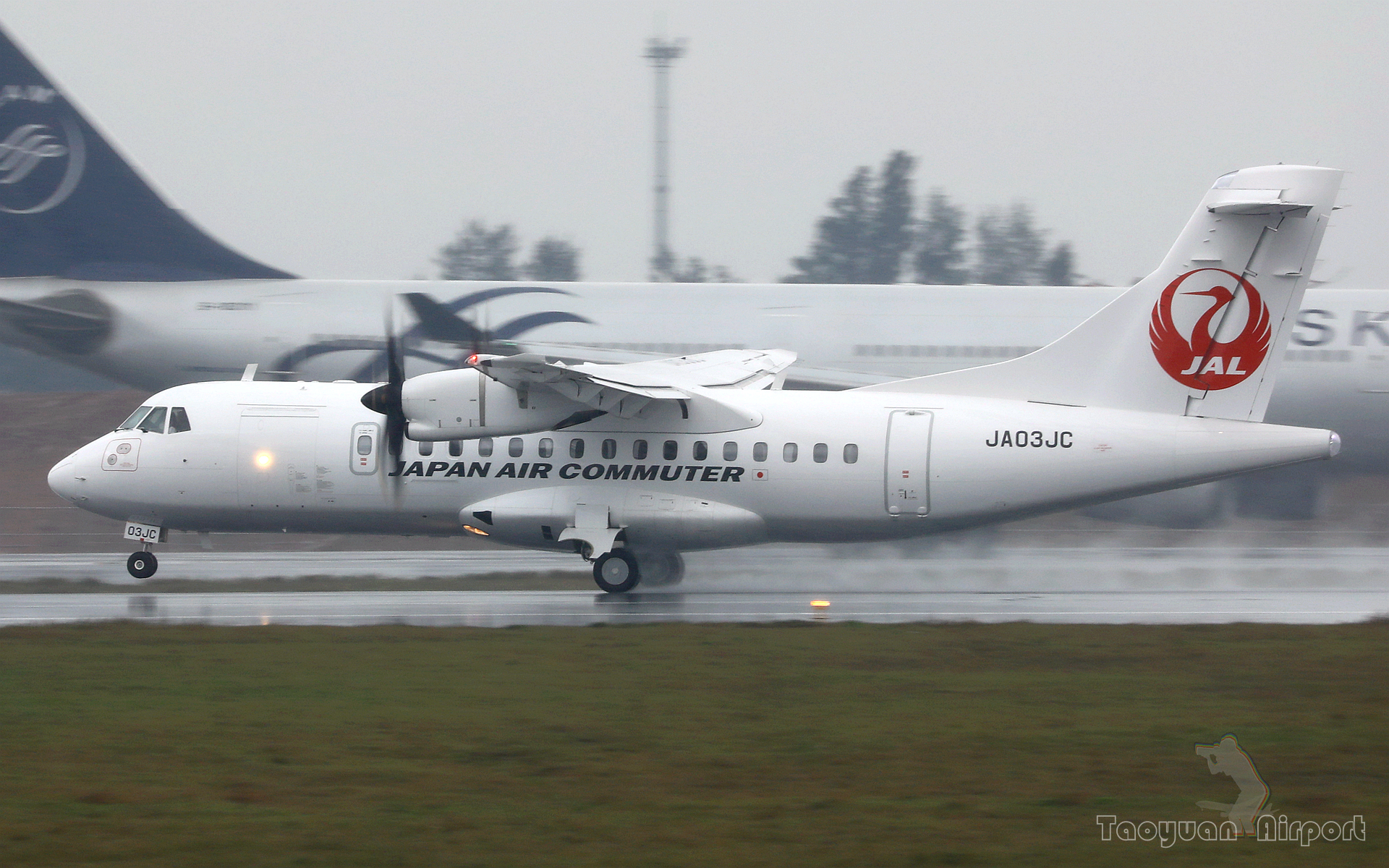
IATA	ICAO	Call sign
JC	JAC	COMMUTER
- Founded: July 1, 1983; 43 years ago
- Commenced operations: December 1983; 42 years ago
- Hubs: Kagoshima
- Focus cities: Amami Oshima; Fukuoka; Osaka–Itami
- Frequent-flyer program: JAL Mileage Bank
- Alliance: Oneworld (affiliate)
- Fleet size: 11
- Destinations: 14
- Parent company: JAL Group (60%)
- Headquarters: Kirishima, Kagoshima Prefecture, Japan
- Key people: Kato Hiroki (President)
- Employees: 467 (1 March 2017)
- Website: www.jac.co.jp

Japan Air Commuter (JAC) is a Japanese regional airline based in Kirishima, Kagoshima Prefecture. It operates feeder services in support of Japan Airlines and All Nippon Airways. Its main base is Kagoshima Airport, with focus cities at Itami Airport, Amami Airport and Fukuoka Airport. JAC is owned by Japan Airlines (60%) and 12 local municipalities of the Amami Islands and Kagoshima (40%).

== History ==
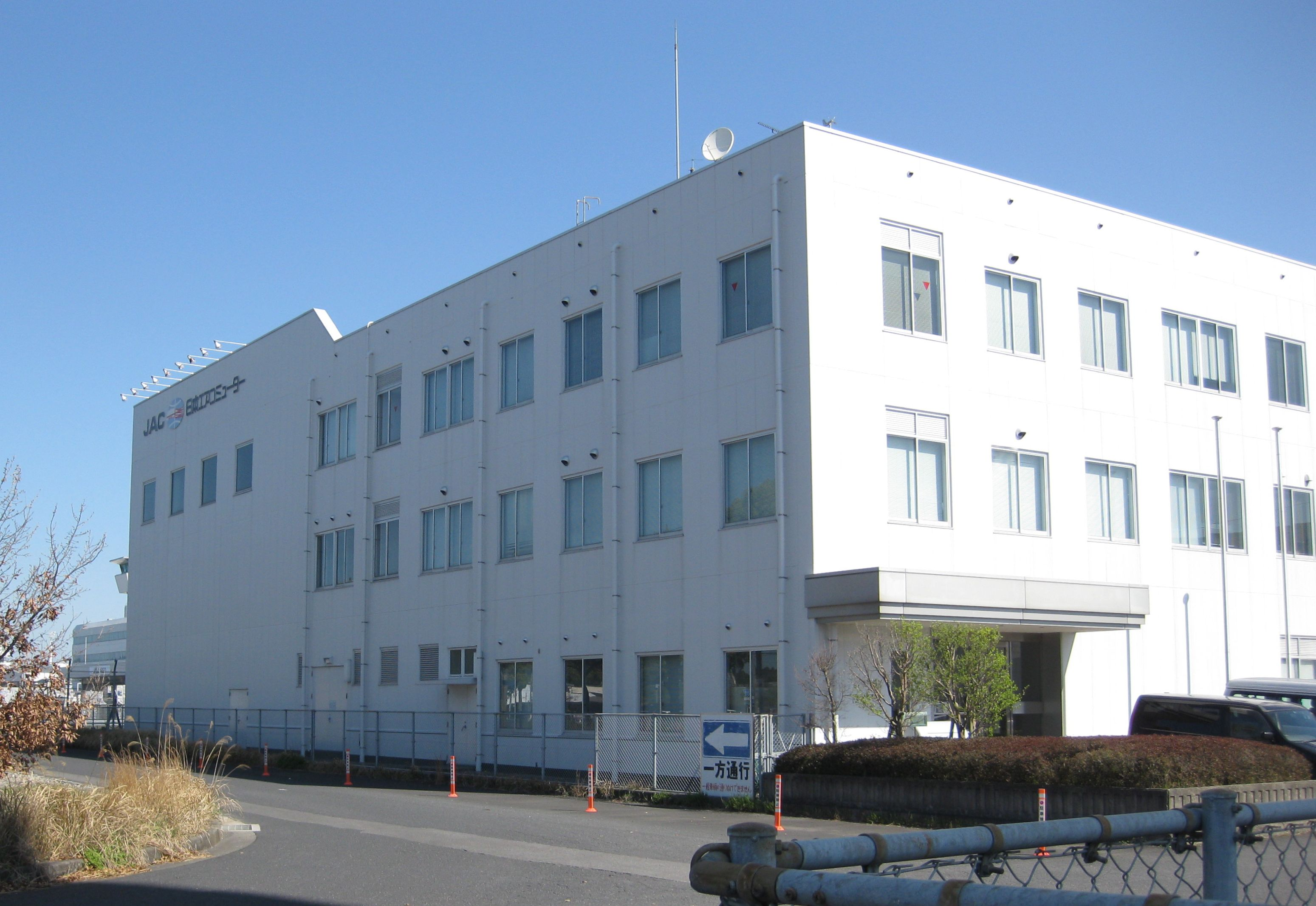
Japan Air Commuter headquarters

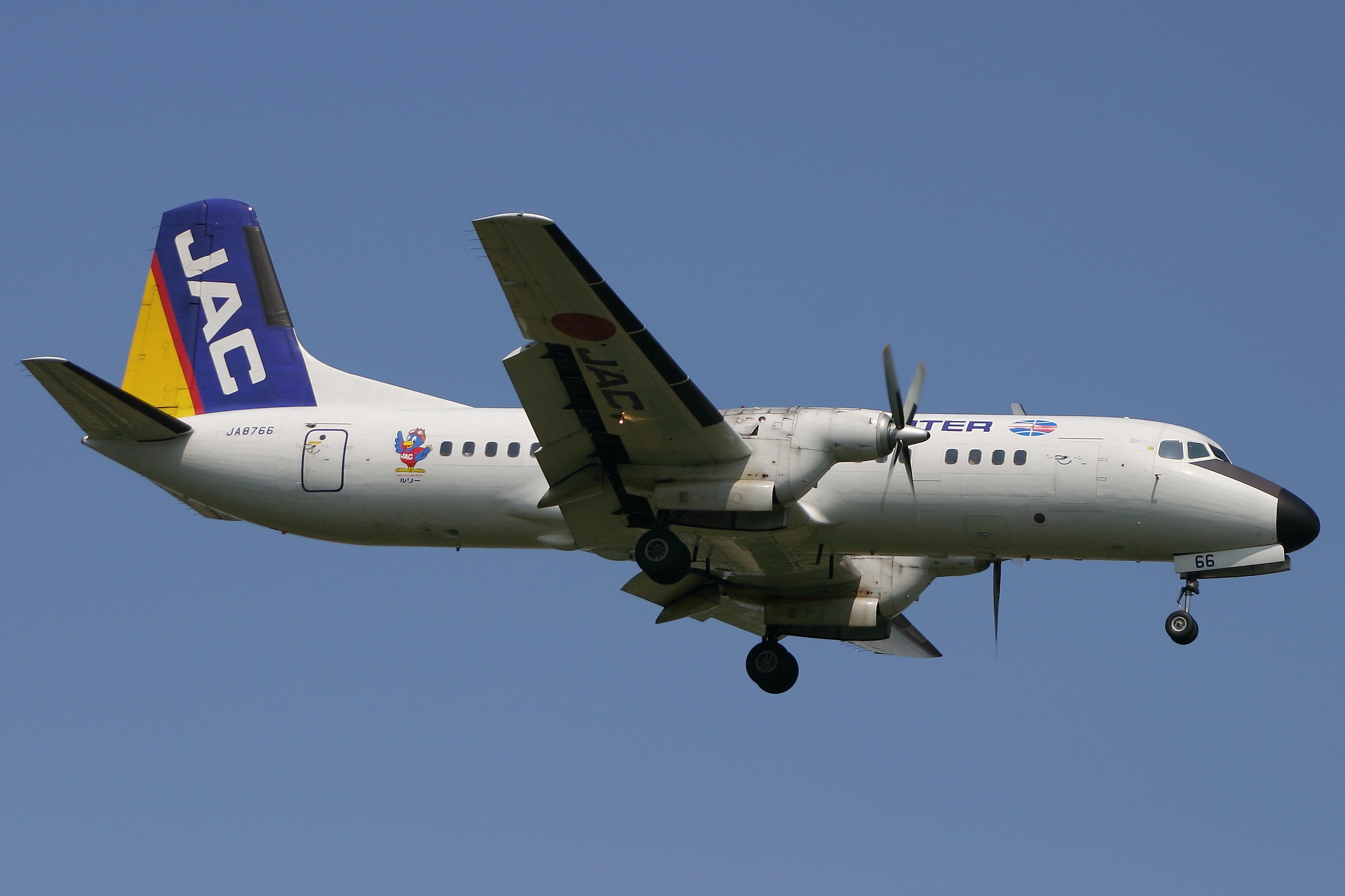
A former Japan Air Commuter NAMC YS-11 in 2004

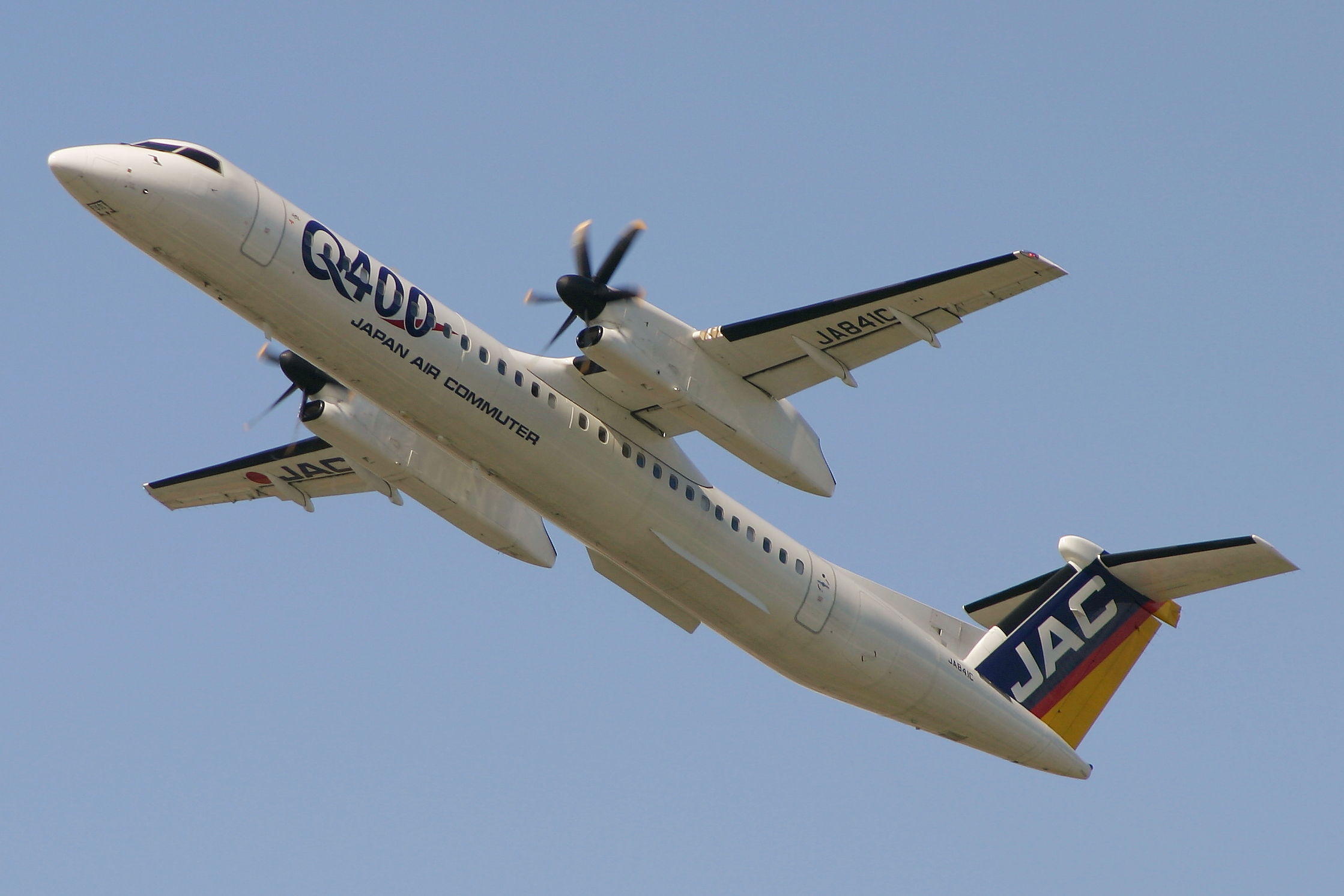
A former Japan Air Commuter Bombardier Dash 8 Q400 in the old "JAC" livery (2004)

The airline was established on 1 July 1983 and started operations in December 1983. A joint investment plan with public and private investors in fourteen Kagoshima Prefecture municipalities established Japan Air Commuter. At the time JAC was an affiliate of Toa Domestic Airlines, later known as Japan Air System. Japan Air System later merged into Japan Airlines.

In the 1990s JAC had its headquarters in the Kagoshima Airport Building Annex in Mizobe, Aira District, Kagoshima Prefecture.

In October 2019, JAC, Japan Airlines, All Nippon Airways, Oriental Air Bridge, and Amakusa Airlines formed Essential Air Service Alliance LLP (EAS LLP), a limited liability partnership, as an alliance among the three Kyushu regional carriers, with the aim of consolidating safety and technical operations, sales promotions, procurement, personnel, and other functions. JAC began code sharing with All Nippon Airways in October 2022, with certain flights carrying both ANA and JAL flight numbers.

JAC joined Oneworld as an affiliate member in October 2020.

== Destinations ==
Japan Air Commuter operates to the following destinations (as of January 2020):

Island	City	Airport	Notes	Ref
Honshu	Izumo	Izumo Airport		
Honshu	Okinoshima	Oki Airport		
Honshu	Osaka	Itami Airport	Focus city	
Honshu	Toyooka	Tajima Airport		
Kyushu	Fukuoka	Fukuoka Airport	Focus city	
Kyushu	Kagoshima	Kagoshima Airport	Hub	
Ryukyu Islands	Amami	Amami Airport	Focus city	
Ryukyu Islands	Kikai	Kikai Airport		
Ryukyu Islands	Naha	Naha Airport		
Ryukyu Islands	Tanegashima	New Tanegashima Airport		
Ryukyu Islands	Tokunoshima	Tokunoshima Airport		
Ryukyu Islands	Wadomari	Okinoerabu Airport		
Ryukyu Islands	Yakushima	Yakushima Airport		
Ryukyu Islands	Yoron	Yoron Airport		
Shikoku	Matsuyama	Matsuyama Airport		

=== Codeshare agreements ===
Japan Air Commuter has codeshare agreements with the following airlines:

- All Nippon Airways

== Fleet ==
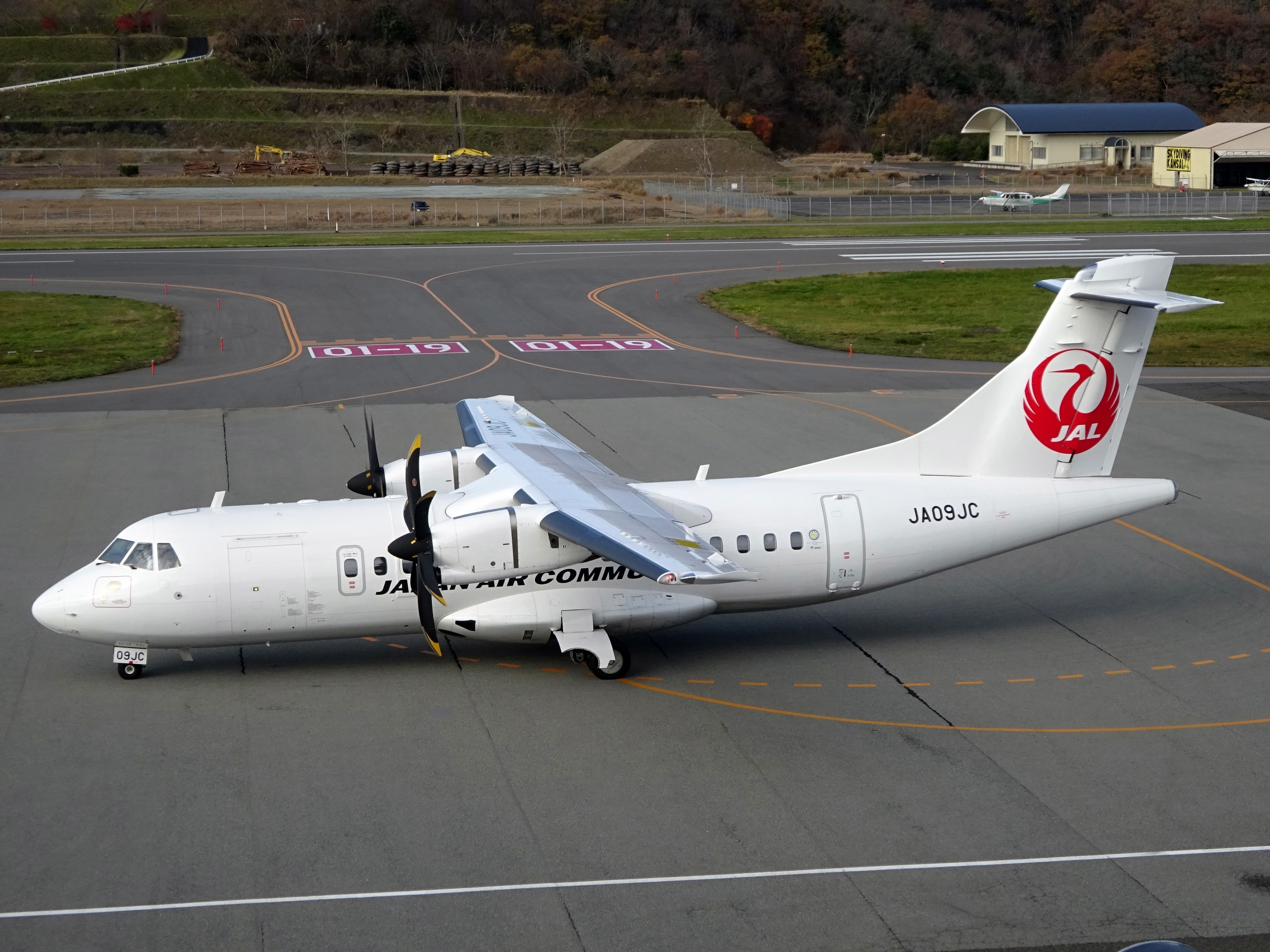
ATR 42-600 in current livery

=== Current fleet ===
As of July 2026, Japan Air Commuter operates the following aircraft:

Japan Air Commuter fleet
Aircraft	Total	Orders	Passengers	Notes
ATR 42-600	9	—	48	
ATR 72-600	2	—	70	
Total	11	—		

=== Former fleet ===
As of August 2025, Japan Air Commuter operated 9 ATR 42-600 and 2 ATR 72-600.

Japan Air Commuter also previously operated the following aircraft:

Japan Air Commuter fleet history
Aircraft	Fleet	Year Introduced	Year Retired	Notes/Refs
NAMC YS-11A-500	12	1988	2006	
Saab 340B	11	1992	2019	
