= Kikai, Kagoshima =

Kikai 喜界町 Kyā
- Town
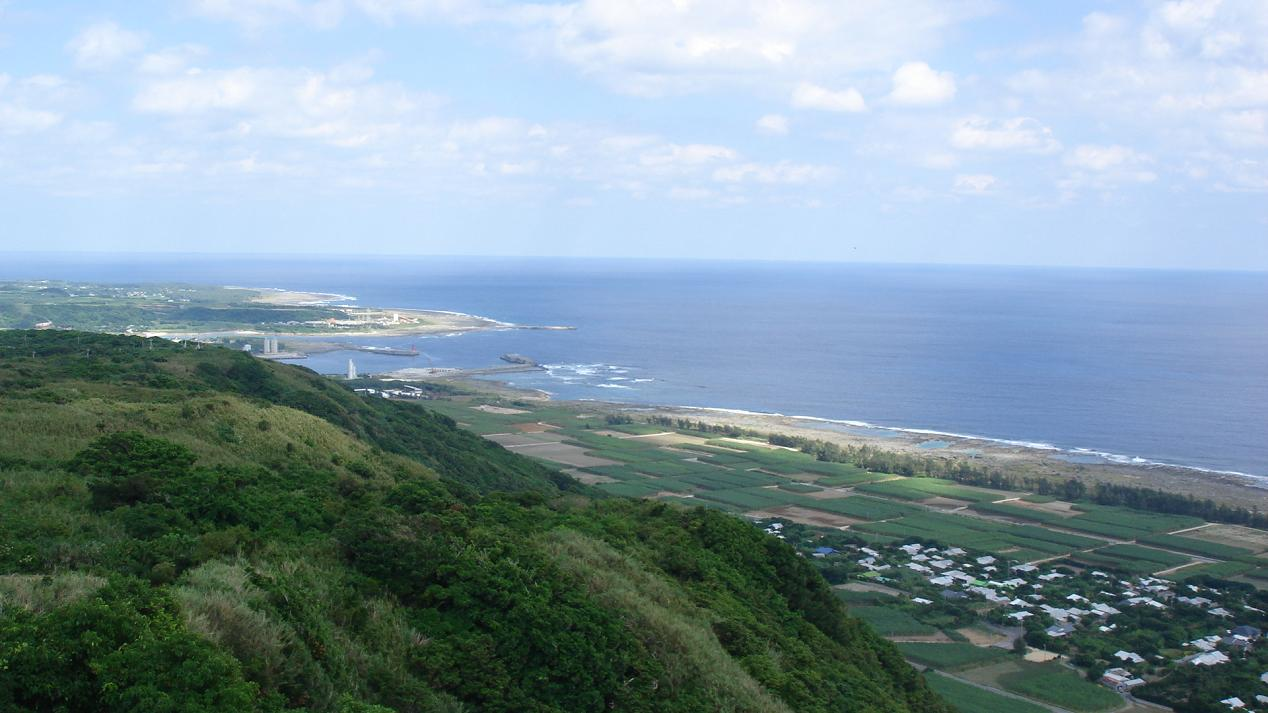
- A view of Kikai Island from Hyakunodai hill

- Flag Seal

- Location of Kikai in Kagoshima Prefecture

- Coordinates: 28°19′19″N 129°57′44″E
- Country: Japan
- Region: Kyushu (Amami Islands)
- Prefecture: Kagoshima Prefecture
- District: Ōshima

Government
  - -Mayor: Kawashima Tateo

Area
  - Total: 56.82 km^{2} (21.94 sq mi)

Population (1 October 2020)
  - Total: 6,629
  - Density: 117/km^{2} (300/sq mi)
- Time zone: UTC+9 (Japan Standard Time)
- Flower: Agave
- Phone number: 0997-65-1111
- Address: 1746, Ōaza Wan, Kikai-chō, Ōshima-gun, Kagoshima-ken 891-6292
- Website: www.town.kikai.lg.jp

Kikai (喜界町, Kikai-chō; Amami:Kyā ,Okinawan:Cikai) is a town located on Kikaijima, in Ōshima District, Kagoshima Prefecture, Japan.

In October 2020 the town had an estimated population of 6,629 and a population density of 117 persons per km^{2}. The total area is 56.82 km^{2}. The economy of the town is based on sugar cane, shōchū refining, and seasonal tourism.

== Geography ==
Kikai occupies all of the island of Kikaijima. The climate is classified as humid subtropical (Köppen climate classification Cfa) with very warm summers and mild winters. Precipitation is high throughout the year, but is highest in the months of May, June and September. The town is subject to frequent typhoons.

== History ==
The village of Kikai was established on 1 April 1908. It was upgraded to town status in 1941. As with all of the Amami Islands, the village came under the administration of the United States from 1 July 1946 to 25 December 1953.

== Transport ==
=== Ports ===
- Kikai Port
- Soumachi Port

=== Airport ===
- Kikai Airport

== Notable residents ==
- In 2018, the then-oldest person in the world, Nabi Tajima (born August 1900) died in a hospital in Kikai at age 117.
