= Okinoerabu Airport =

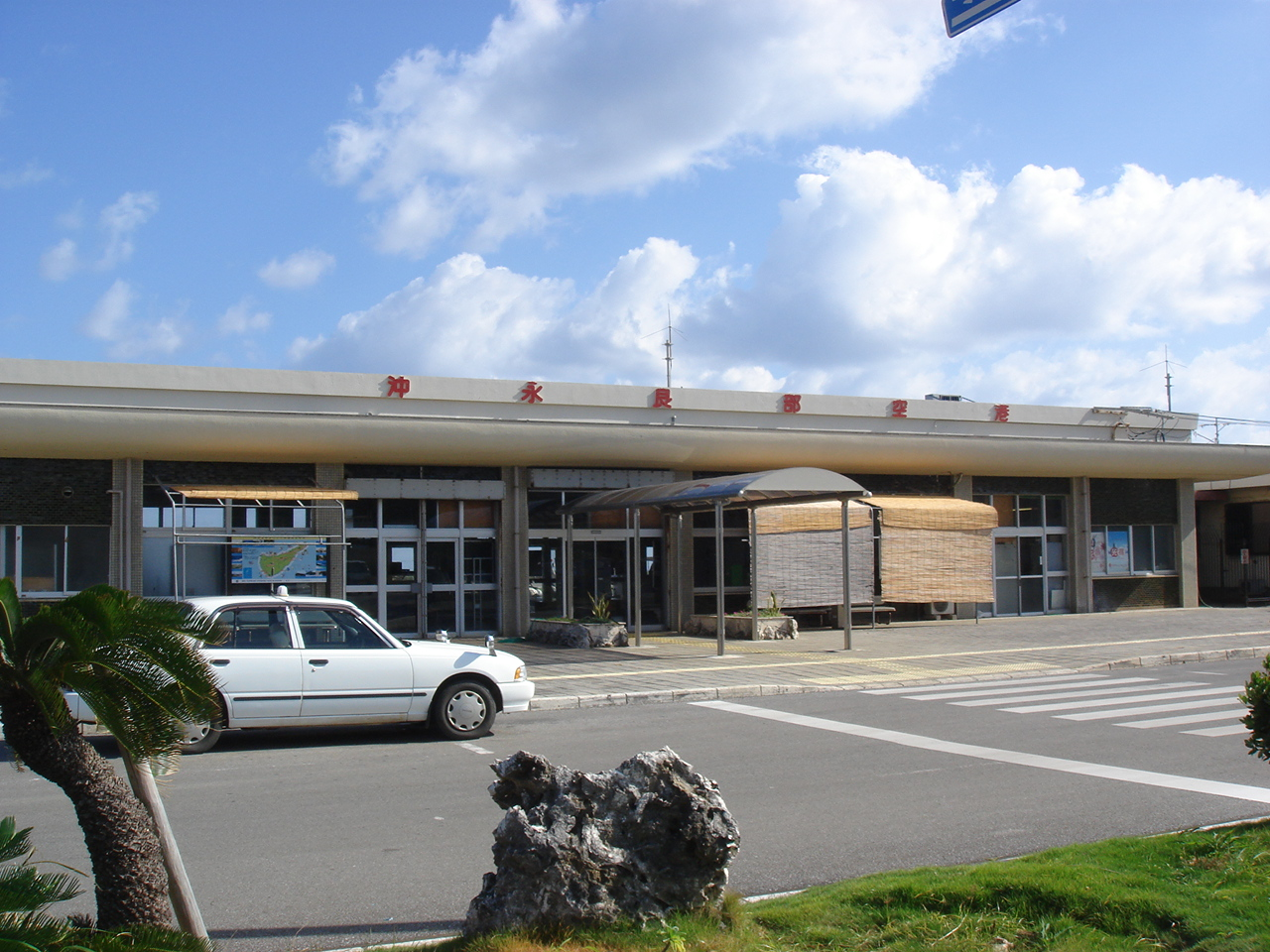
- IATA: OKE; ICAO: RJKB

Summary
- Airport type: Public
- Operator: Kagoshima Prefecture
- Elevation AMSL: 88 ft / 27 m
- Coordinates: 27°25′54″N 128°42′20″E

Map
- Location in Japan RJKB (Japan)

Runways
Direction	Length		Surface
Direction	m	ft	Surface
04/22	1,400	4,593	Asphalt concrete

Statistics (2015)
- Passengers: 99,586
- Cargo (metric tonnes): 141
- Aircraft movement: 3,706
- Source: Japanese Ministry of Land, Infrastructure, Transport and Tourism

Okinoerabu Airport (沖永良部空港, Okinoerabu Kūkō) (IATA: OKE, ICAO: RJKB) is located on the island of Okinoerabujima in the town of Wadomari, Ōshima District, Kagoshima Prefecture, Japan.

== History ==
Okinoerabu Airport was opened on 1 May 1969 with a 1200-meter runway, and was officially certified as a third-class airport by the Japanese government on 31 May 1969. In order to handle operations by Bombardier Q400 aircraft, the runway was reinforced and lengthened to 1400 meters on 12 May 2005. The last commercial operation of the NAMC YS-11 in Japan was on 30 September 2006 on a flight from Okenoerabu to Kagoshima.

== Airlines and destinations ==
Airlines	Destinations
Japan Air Commuter	Amami Ōshima, Kagoshima, Naha, Tokunoshima

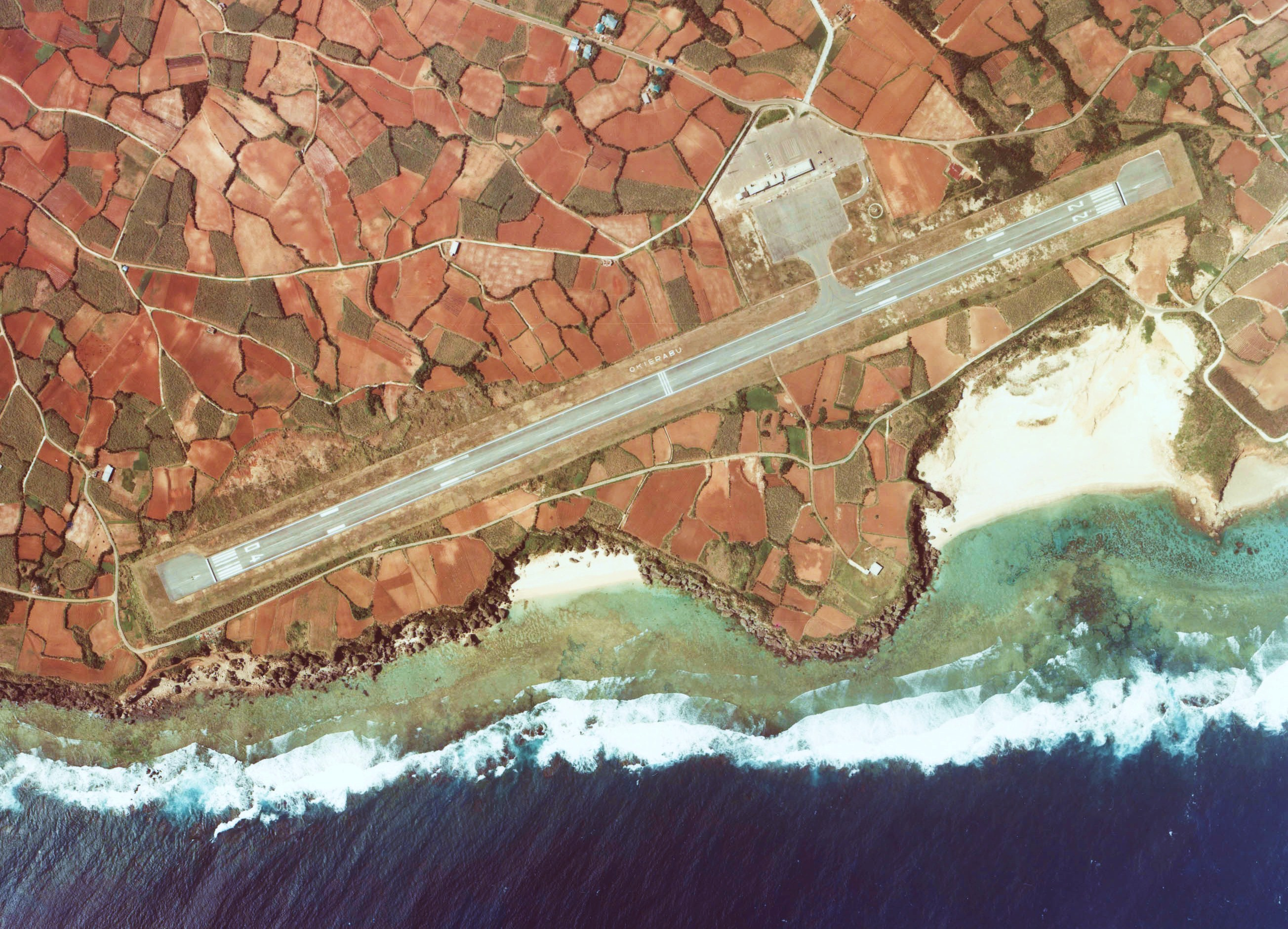
Okinoerabu Airport
