= Yoron Airport =

Yoron Airport 与論空港
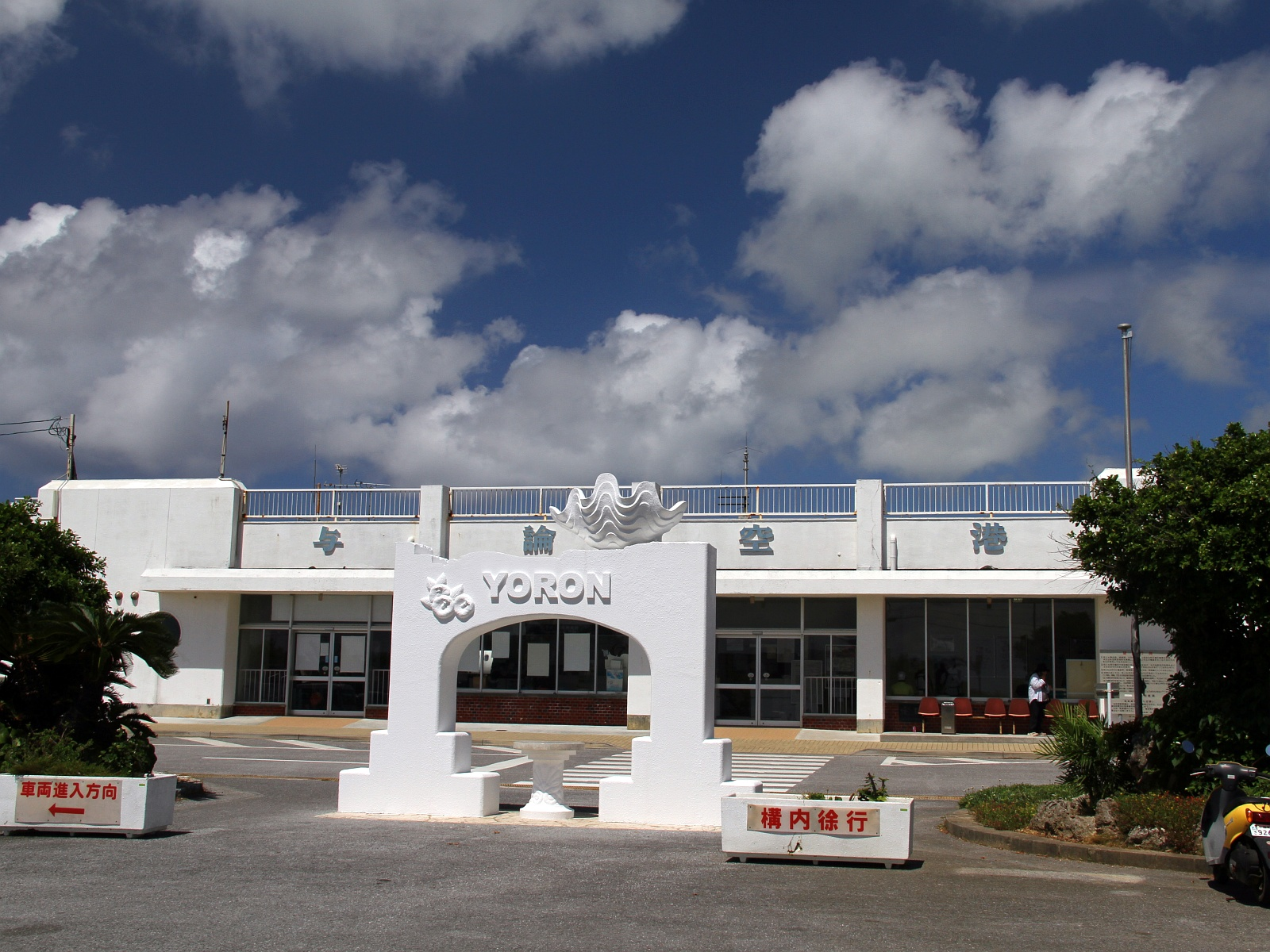
- IATA: RNJ; ICAO: RORY

Summary
- Airport type: Public
- Location: Yoronjima (Yoron Island), Japan
- Elevation AMSL: 47 ft (14 m)
- Coordinates: 27°02′38″N 128°24′06″E

Map
- Location in Japan RORY (Japan)

Runways
Direction	Length		Surface
Direction	m	ft	Surface
14/32	1,200	3,937	Asphalt concrete

Statistics (2015)
- Passengers: 77,875
- Cargo (metric tonnes): 59
- Aircraft movement: 2,904
- Source: Japanese Ministry of Land, Infrastructure, Transport and Tourism

Yoron Airport (与論空港, Yoron Kūkō) (IATA: RNJ, ICAO: RORY) is a third-class airport located on Yoronjima (Yoron Island) in Kagoshima Prefecture, Japan.

== History ==
Yoron Airport was opened on 1 May 1976 (50 years ago). On 12 May 2005, the runway was strengthened to enable operations by the Bombardier Dash 8 aircraft.

== Airlines and destinations ==
Airlines	Destinations
Japan Air Commuter	Kagoshima, Naha
Ryukyu Air Commuter	Naha
