= Amami Airport =

Airport in Amami Ōshima, Kagoshima Prefecture, Japan

Amami Airport 奄美空港
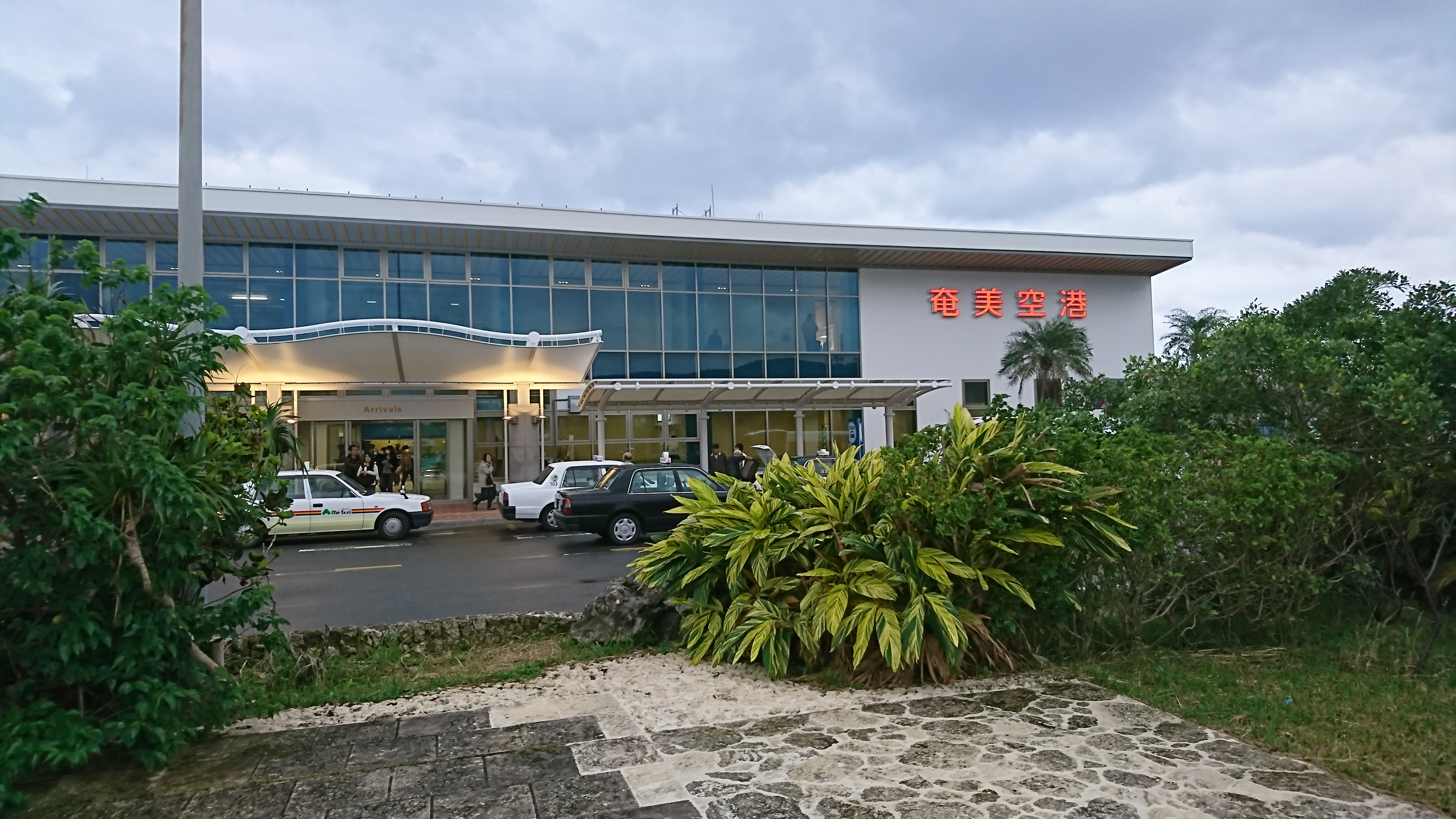
- IATA: ASJ; ICAO: RJKA

Summary
- Airport type: Public
- Operator: Government
- Serves: Amami Ōshima (Amami Island), Kagoshima Prefecture, Japan
- Opened: July 10, 1988; 38 years ago
- Elevation AMSL: 14 ft (4.3 m)
- Coordinates: 28°25′51″N 129°42′45″E

Map
- Location in Japan ASJ/RJKA (Japan)

Runways
Direction	Length		Surface
Direction	m	ft	Surface
03/21	2,000	6,562	Asphalt

Statistics (2015)
- Passengers: 676,601
- Cargo (metric tonnes): 1,097
- Aircraft movement: 15,292
- Source: Japanese Ministry of Land, Infrastructure, Transport and Tourism

Amami Airport (奄美空港, Amami Kūkō) (IATA: ASJ, ICAO: RJKA) is an airport located 21.9 km (13.6 mi) east-northeast of Amami, a city on Amami Ōshima (Amami Island) in the Kagoshima Prefecture of Japan.

== History ==
Amami Airport was opened as Amami Oshima Airport (奄美大島空港, Amami-Ōshima Kūkō) on June 1, 1964, with a 1240-meter runway about 2 kilometers southwest of its current position. A new airport with a runway of 2000 meters to accept jet aircraft was opened at its current location on July 10, 1988, at which time the former airport was closed. The remnants of the old airport can still be seen via satellite images and many parts of the former airport has since become a park.

== Airlines and destinations ==
=== Passenger ===
Airlines	Destinations
J-Air	Fukuoka, Kagoshima
Japan Air Commuter	Kagoshima, Kikai, Naha, Okinoerabu, Tokunoshima, Yoron
Japan Airlines	Osaka–Itami, Tokyo–Haneda
Peach	Osaka–Kansai, Tokyo–Narita
Skymark Airlines	Kagoshima
