= Tokunoshima Airport =

Airport in Kagoshima Prefecture, Japan

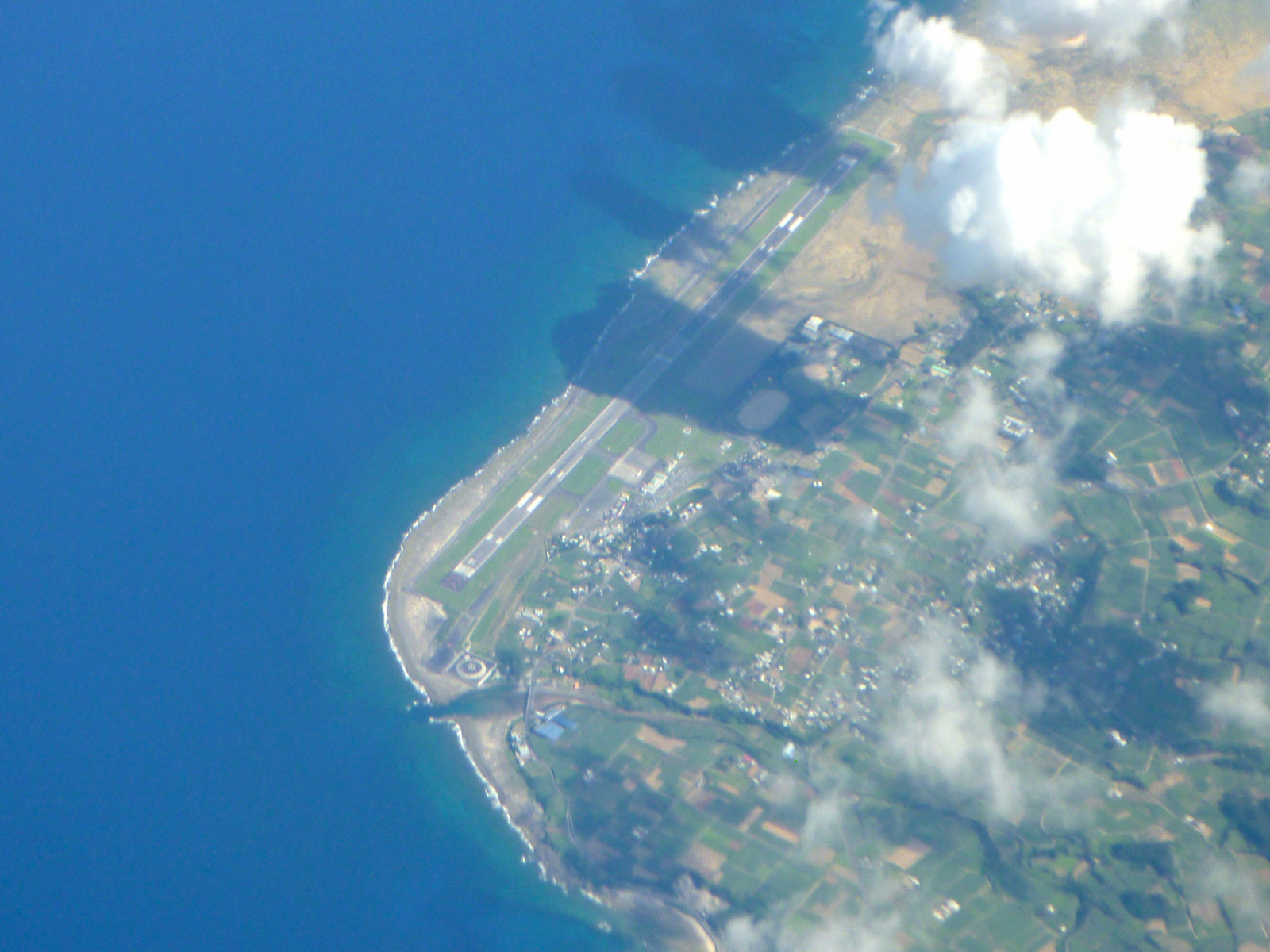
- IATA: TKN; ICAO: RJKN

Summary
- Airport type: Public
- Operator: Government
- Serves: Tokunoshima
- Location: Amagi, Ōshima District, Kagoshima Prefecture, Japan
- Opened: February 23, 1962; 64 years ago
- Elevation AMSL: 8 ft (2.4 m)
- Coordinates: 27°50′11″N 128°52′53″E

Map
- Location in Japan TKN/RJKN (Japan)

Runways
Direction	Length		Surface
Direction	m	ft	Surface
01/19	2,000	6,562	Asphalt

Statistics (2015)
- Passengers: 168,532
- Cargo (metric tonnes): 211
- Aircraft movement: 5,083
- Source: Japanese Ministry of Land, Infrastructure, Transport and Tourism

Tokunoshima Airport (徳之島空港, Tokunoshima Kūkō) (IATA: TKN, ICAO: RJKN) is an airport on the island of Tokunoshima, located in the town of Amagi, Ōshima District, Kagoshima Prefecture of Japan.

== History ==
Tokunoshima Airport was opened on 23 February 1962 as a private venture by Toa Domestic Airlines with a 1,080-meter runway. The airport was turned over to Kagoshima Prefecture on 24 October 1970, and was designated a 3rd class airport by the Japanese government on 27 February 1973. The runway was extended to 1,200 meters on 1 June 1973, 1,500 meters in 1978 and to 2,000 meters on 1 June 1980, becoming the first airport in the prefecture outside Kagoshima Airport to be capable of handling jet aircraft operations.

In 2010, Prime Minister Yukio Hatoyama offered the use of Tokunoshima to the United States as a relocation site for Marine Corps Air Station Futenma, leading to widespread protests.

== Airlines and destinations ==
Airlines	Destinations
J-Air	Kagoshima
Japan Air Commuter	Amami Ōshima, Kagoshima, Okinoerabu
