= Matsuyama Airport =

Airport in Ehime, Japan

Matsuyama Airport 松山空港
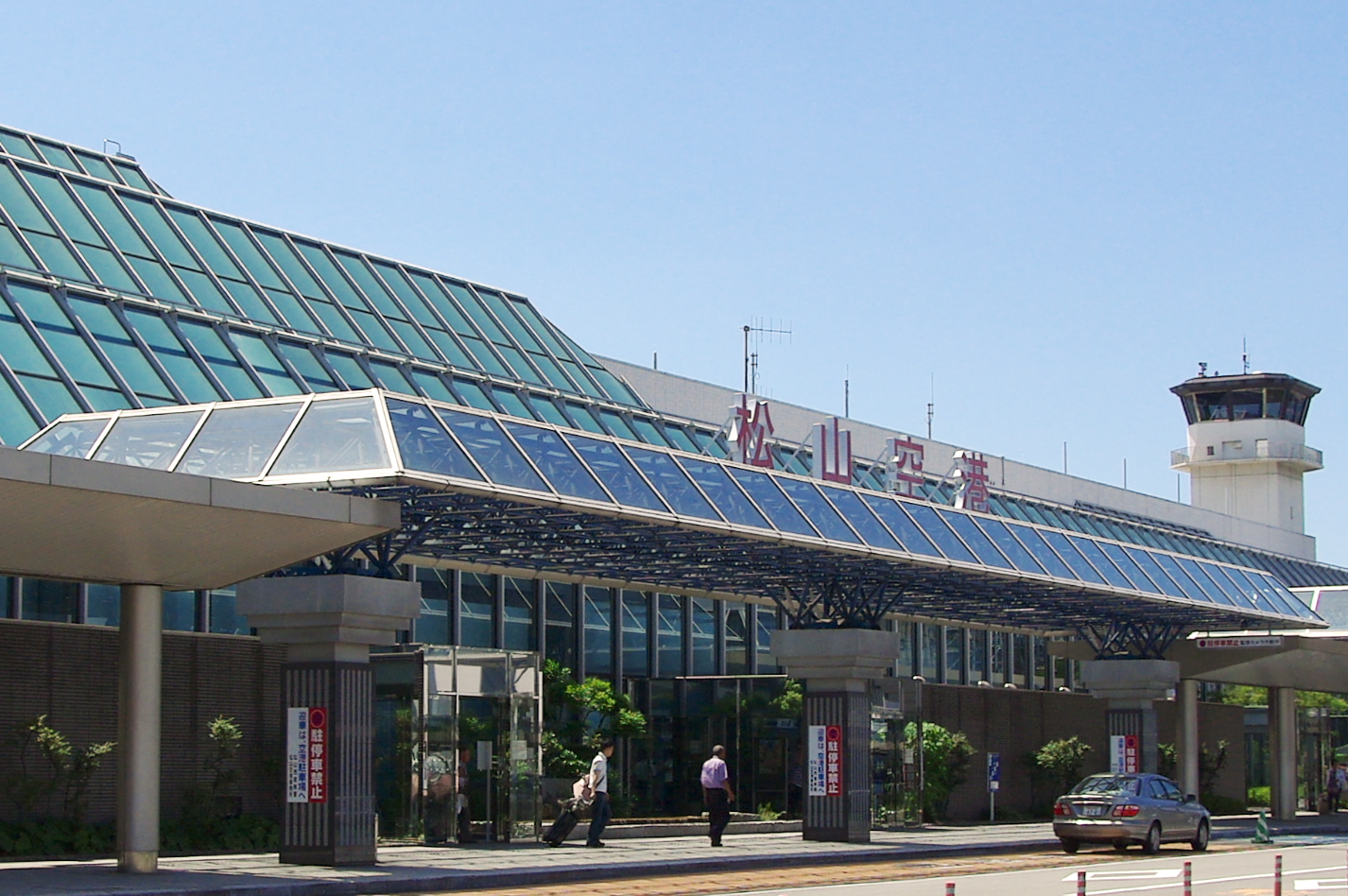
- IATA: MYJ; ICAO: RJOM

Summary
- Airport type: Public
- Operator: Ministry of Land, Infrastructure, Transport and Tourism
- Location: Matsuyama, Ehime Prefecture, Japan
- Elevation AMSL: 13 ft (4.0 m)
- Coordinates: 33°49′38″N 132°41′59″E
- Website: www.matsuyama-airport.co.jp

Map
- Location in Ehime Prefecture Location in Japan

Runways
Direction	Length		Surface
Direction	m	ft	Surface
14/32	2,500	8,202	Asphalt

Statistics (2015)
- Passengers: 2,863,239
- Cargo (metric tonnes): 7,696
- Aircraft movement: 30,987
- Source: Japanese Ministry of Land, Infrastructure, Transport and Tourism

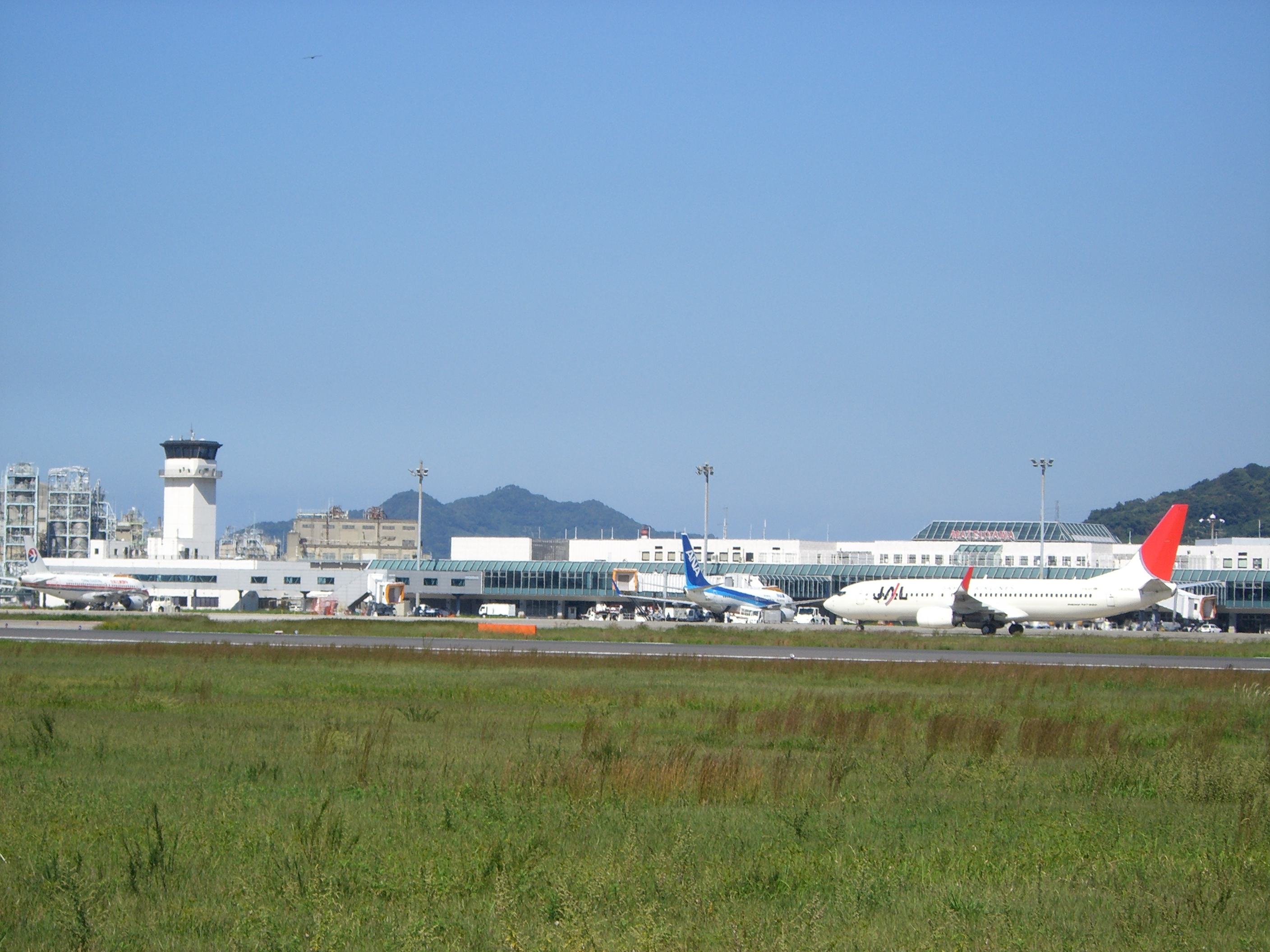
View of Matsuyama Airport

Matsuyama Airport (松山空港, Matsuyama kūkō) (IATA: MYJ, ICAO: RJOM) is an airport located 3 NM (5.6 km; 3.5 mi) west-southwest of the center of Matsuyama, Ehime Prefecture, Japan. The airport was built on the coastline facing the Seto Inland Sea. In 2018, the airport had approximately 3.2 million passengers and was the busiest in the Chugoku-Shikoku region, surpassing Hiroshima Airport.

== History ==
The airport opened as an Imperial Japanese Navy airfield in 1941. At the end of the war it served as the base for the 353th Fighter Squadron which defended against B-29s' raid. The airport then became under the administration of the British Commonwealth Occupation Force and became a country-administered civil airport in 1952. During the Korean War, the airport was used by the US and British Military. It was the first airport in Shikoku to see jet service following a runway extension project in 1972.

An office park named "Biz Port" opened near the airport in 2003 to attract technology businesses, but was scheduled to close on 1 April 2015.

In 2013, the government of Ehime Prefecture and local business organizations announced that they would begin subsidizing the airport's international routes to Shanghai and Seoul, which had seen load factors of less than 50% in June 2013.

All international service at the airport was suspended in 2020 due to the COVID-19 pandemic. International service resumed in December 2022 with a VietJet charter flight bringing tourists from Ho Chi Minh City.

Charter flights between Matsuyama Airport and Taipei–Songshan Airport were expected to be resumed in February 2023.

== Airlines and destinations ==
Airlines	Destinations
Aero K	Cheongju (begins 2 January 2027)
Air Busan	Busan
All Nippon Airways	Naha, Osaka–Itami, Tokyo–Haneda
EVA Air	Taipei–Taoyuan
Ibex Airlines	Nagoya–Centrair
Japan Airlines	Fukuoka, Kagoshima, Osaka–Itami, Tokyo–Haneda
Jeju Air	Seoul–Incheon
Jetstar Japan	Tokyo–Narita

== Statistics ==
Statistics for Matsuyama Airport
Year	Total passengers
2000	2,674,045
2001	2,666,972
2002	2,736,346
2003	2,633,410
2004	2,640,578
2005	2,693,188
2006	2,750,092
2007	2,662,611
2008	2,536,739
2009	2,362,688

== Accidents and incidents ==
- On 13 November 1966, All Nippon Airways Flight 533 crashed in the sea just a few miles away from the airport, killing all 50 people on board. The cause was never determined. Because of this event, airport authorities across the country started planning runway extension projects and installation of aeronautical navigation systems including an ILS at every Japanese airport.
- On 26 October 2013, a small propeller aircraft inbound from Kikai Airport crash-landed on the runway at around 6:30 p.m., forcing a temporary closure of the airport.
