= Kikai Airport =

Kikai Airport Kikai/Kikaigashima Island Airport
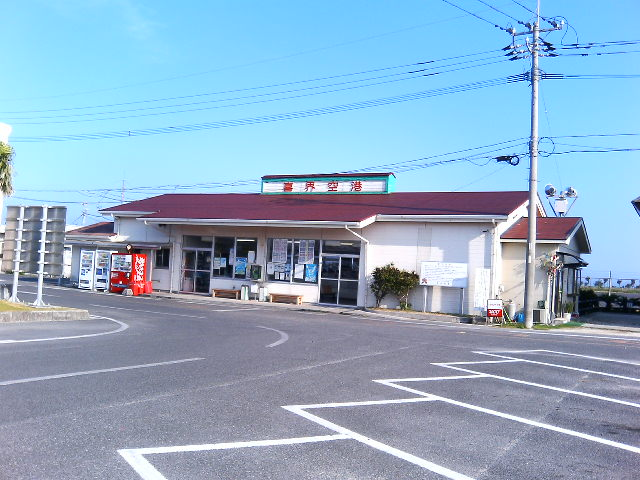
- IATA: KKX; ICAO: RJKI

Summary
- Airport type: Public
- Operator: Government
- Location: Kikai, Kagoshima Prefecture, Japan
- Elevation AMSL: 15 ft / 5 m
- Coordinates: 28°19′17″N 129°55′41″E

Map
- Location in Japan RJKI (Japan)

Runways
Direction	Length		Surface
Direction	m	ft	Surface
07/25	1,200	3,937	Asphalt

Statistics (2015)
- Passengers: 79,892
- Cargo (metric tonnes): 184
- Aircraft movement: 4,006
- Source: Japanese Ministry of Land, Infrastructure, Transport and Tourism

Kikai Airport (喜界空港, Kikai Kūkō) (IATA: KKX, ICAO: RJKI), also known as Kikaijima Airport or Kikaiga Shima Airport, is located in Kikai, a town on Kikaijima (also known as Kikai Island, Kikaishima, Kikaigashima, etc.), one of the Amami Islands in the Kagoshima Prefecture of Japan.

== History ==
An airstrip was opened on the island of Kikaijima in 1931 by the Imperial Japanese Navy. It was attacked by the United States Navy repeatedly during the Battle of Okinawa in the final stages of World War II. One of the pilots on these raids was Samuel Hynes, later a well-known author and university professor. He flew a single-engine Avenger aircraft. In May 1968, the old airstrip was re-opened for commercial use with a 1200-meter runway. The airport was closed from August to December 1968 to permit strengthening of the runway. In April 1971, it was designated as a third-class airport by the Japanese government.

== Airlines and destinations ==
Airlines	Destinations
Japan Air Commuter	Amami Ōshima, Kagoshima
