= Kagoshima Airport =

Airport in Kirishima, Kagoshima Prefecture, Japan

Kagoshima Airport 鹿児島空港
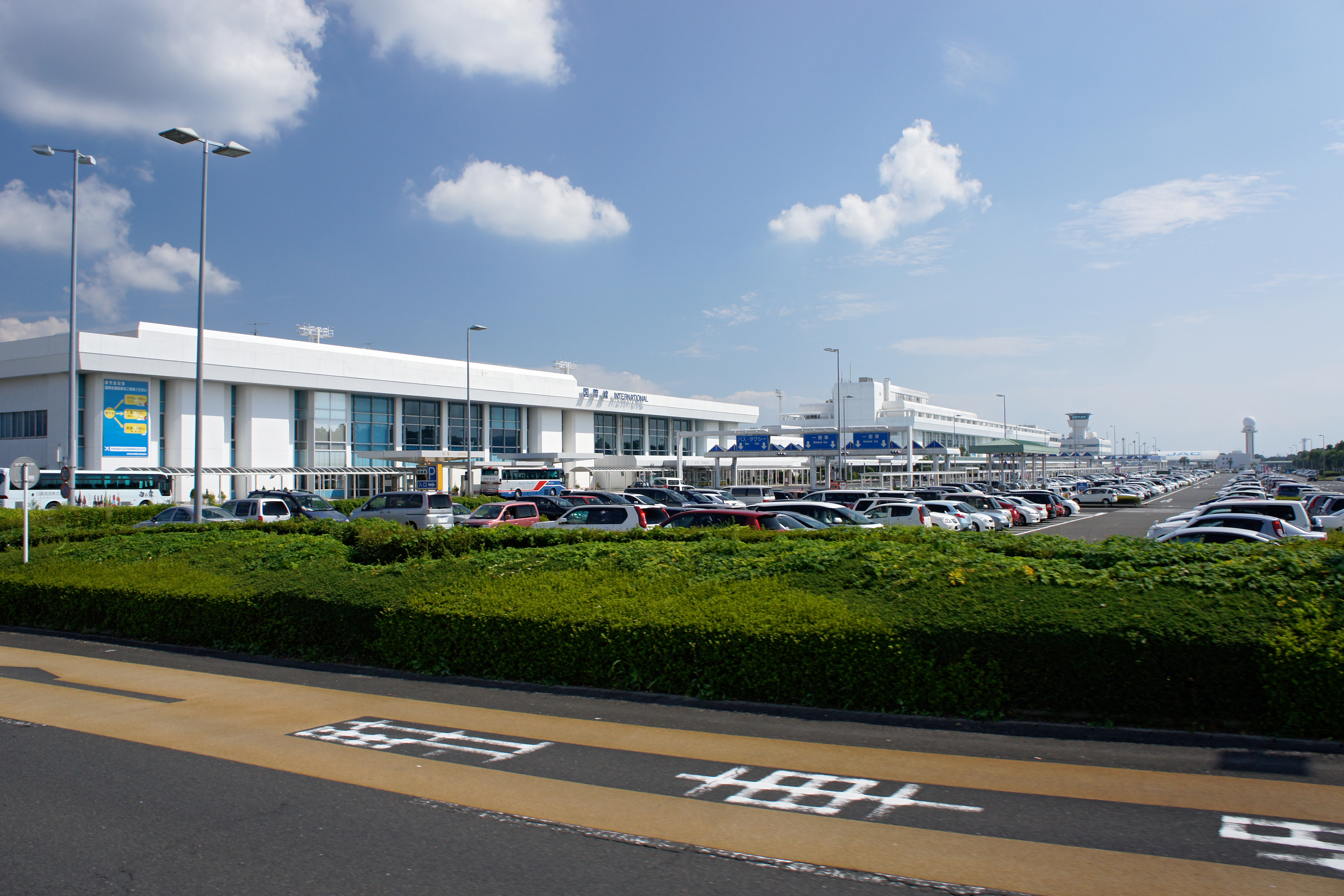
- IATA: KOJ; ICAO: RJFK

Summary
- Airport type: Public
- Operator: Ministry of Land, Infrastructure and Transport (airfield); Kagoshima Airport Building Co., Ltd. (terminal)
- Serves: Kagoshima
- Location: Kirishima, Kagoshima Prefecture, Japan
- Opened: 1972; 54 years ago
- Operating base for: Japan Air Commuter; Skymark Airlines
- Elevation AMSL: 892 ft (272 m)
- Coordinates: 31°48′12″N 130°43′01″E
- Website: www.koj-ab.co.jp/en

Map
- Location in Japan KOJ/RJFK (Japan)

Runways
Direction	Length		Surface
Direction	m	ft	Surface
16/34	3,000	9,843	Asphalt/concrete

Statistics (2015)
- Passengers: 5,220,710
- Cargo (metric tonnes): 30,402
- Aircraft movement: 66,645
- Source: Japanese Ministry of Land, Infrastructure, Transport and Tourism

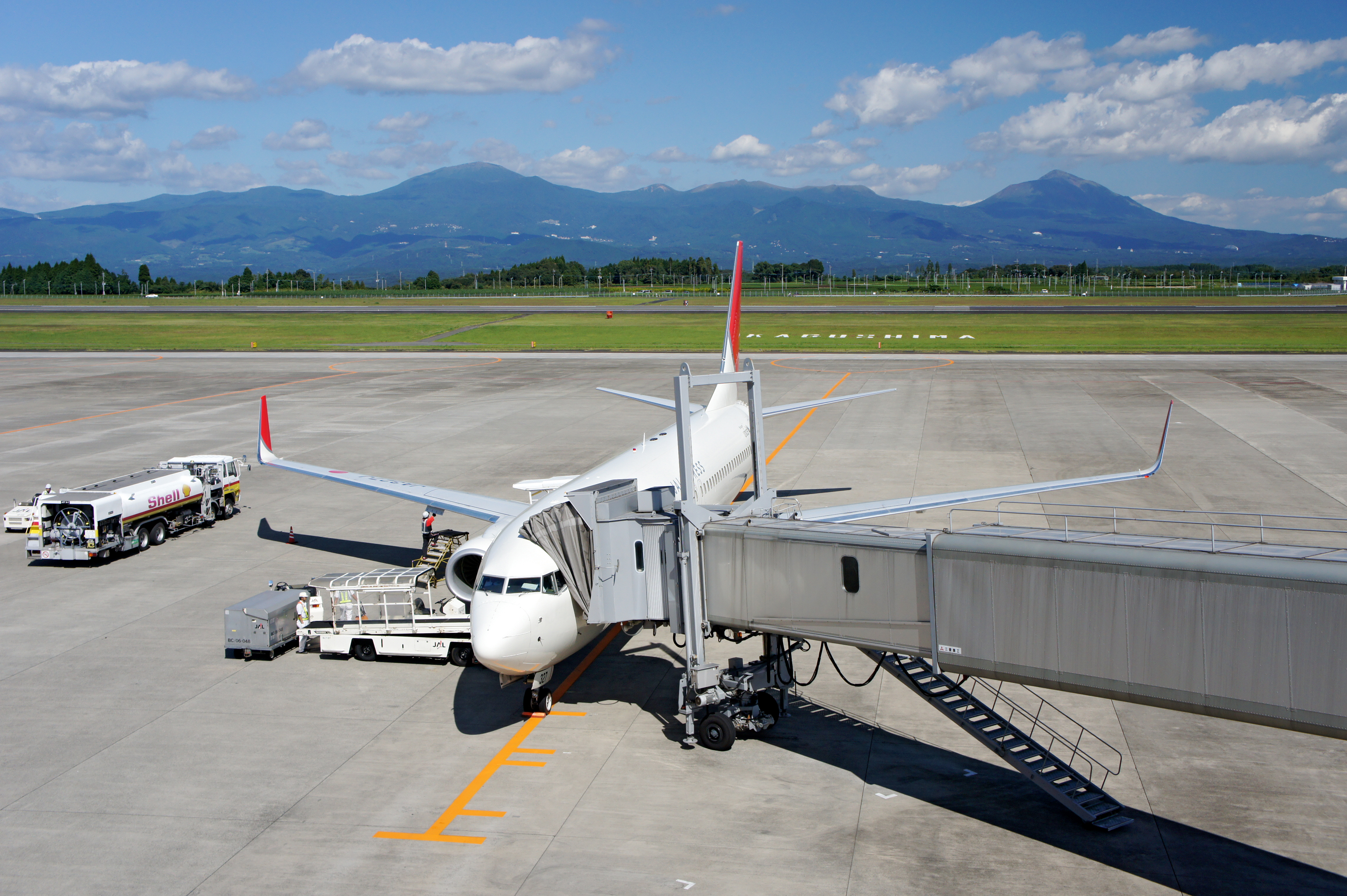
Apron

Kagoshima Airport (鹿児島空港, Kagoshima Kūkō) (IATA: KOJ, ICAO: RJFK) is an international airport located in Kirishima, Kagoshima Prefecture, Japan, 29.6 km (18.4 mi) northeast of Kagoshima-Chūō Station in Kagoshima City. It is the second-busiest airport in Kyushu after Fukuoka Airport, serving 6.1 million passengers in 2018.

The airport covers 187.7 hectares (464 acres) and has one 3000m runway.

Japan Air Commuter, a regional affiliate of Japan Airlines, and New Japan Aviation have their headquarters at the airport.

Kagoshima Airport serves as the gateway to the Satsunan Islands in Kagoshima Prefecture. As a result, the route between Tokyo Haneda Airport and Kagoshima Airport is the fifth busiest route in Japan. It was ranked seventh in the world in Skytrax’s World's Best Domestic Airports 2024.

== Overview ==
The airport is located 30km northeast of Kagoshima City. Although access by train is poor, access via expressway is good because it is close to the E3 Kyushu Expressway Mizobe Kagoshima Airport Interchange.

== History ==
The airport opened in 1972, replacing a former Imperial Japanese Navy airfield in the Kamoike area near the city center, which had served as the city's main airport since 1957. The site of the former airport was re-developed as a "new town" with office buildings and high-density housing projects, and is now the site of the Kagoshima Prefecture government office, among other buildings.

The airport's runway had an initial length of 2,500 m, which was extended to 3,000 m in 1980. An international terminal opened in 1982, and a cargo terminal opened in 1987.

Air Niugini, Cathay Pacific, China Airlines and Nauru Airlines provided international service to Kagoshima from the 1970s to the 1980s, and JAL operated a route to Singapore via Hong Kong and Bangkok during the 1980s. Kagoshima served as the destination of the final scheduled NAMC YS-11 flight in 2006.

== Facilities ==
Kagoshima's domestic terminal has nine gates. ANA and JAL both operate lounges in the terminal. The international terminal has a single gate.

== Airlines and destinations ==
Airlines	Destinations
All Nippon Airways	Osaka–Itami, Tokyo–Haneda
ANA Wings	Osaka–Itami
China Airlines	Taipei–Taoyuan
Eastar Jet	Seoul–Incheon
Fuji Dream Airlines	Shizuoka
Ibex Airlines	Nagoya–Centrair
J-Air	Amami Ōshima, Osaka–Itami, Tokunoshima
Japan Air Commuter	Amami Ōshima, Fukuoka, Kikai, Matsuyama, Okinoerabu, Tanegashima, Yakushima, Yoron
Japan Airlines	Tokyo–Haneda
Jeju Air	Seoul–Incheon; Charter: Busan
Jetstar Japan	Nagoya–Centrair, Tokyo–Narita
Korean Air	Seoul–Incheon
Peach	Osaka–Kansai
Skymark Airlines	Amami Ōshima, Kobe, Nagoya–Centrair, Tokyo–Haneda
Solaseed Air	Nagoya–Centrair, Naha, Tokyo–Haneda
Trinity Airways	Seasonal: Seoul–Incheon
