= Kogorō =

- Gender: Male

Origin
- Origin: Japanese
- Meaning: Different meanings depending on the kanji used

Kogorō, Kogoro or Kogorou (written: 小五郎) is a masculine Japanese given name. Notable people with the name include:

- Kōgorō Uemura (植村 甲午郎) (1894–1978), Japanese businessman
- Takahira Kogorō (高平 小五郎) (1854–1926), Japanese diplomat and ambassador

Fictional characters:

- Kogoro Akechi (明智 小五郎), fictional amateur detective created by Edogawa Rampo
- Kogoro Mouri (毛利 小五郎), fictional private detective from the Japanese detective manga and anime series, Case Closed written and illustrated by Gosho Aoyama
