= Japan Airlines =

Airline of Japan

Japan Airlines Co., Ltd. 日本航空株式会社 Nihon Kōkū Kabushiki-gaisha

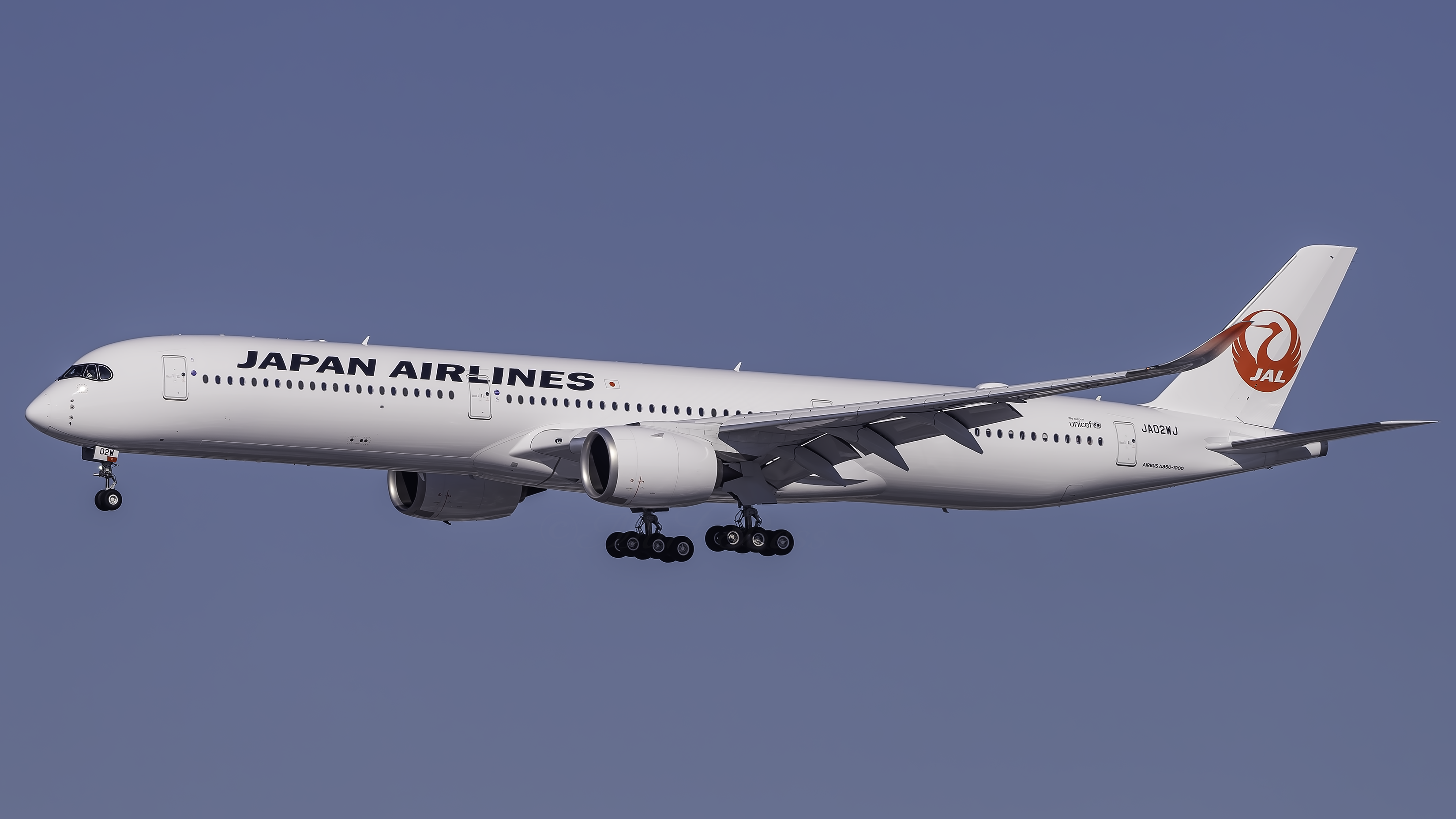
- A Japan Airlines Airbus A350-1000
IATA	ICAO	Call sign
JL	JAL	JAPAN AIR
- Founded: 1 August 1951; 75 years ago
- Commenced operations: 25 October 1951; 75 years ago
- Hubs: Tokyo–Haneda; Tokyo–Narita
- Secondary hubs: Osaka–Itami; Osaka–Kansai
- Focus cities: Fukuoka; Nagoya–Centrair; Naha; Sapporo–Chitose
- Frequent-flyer program: JAL Mileage Bank; JAL Global Club
- Alliance: Oneworld
- Subsidiaries: JAL Cargo; J-Air; Japan Air Commuter (60%); Japan Transocean Air (72.8%); Jetstar Japan (46.7%); Hokkaido Air System (57.3%); Ryukyu Air Commuter (74.5%); Spring Japan (70%); Zipair Tokyo
- Fleet size: 146 (mainline)
- Destinations: 91
- Parent company: JAL Group
- Traded as: TYO: 9201; TOPIX Large70 component
- Headquarters: Shinagawa, Tokyo, Japan
- Key people: Yuji Akasaka (Chairman & Representative Director); Mitsuko Tottori (President & CEO)
- Revenue: ▲¥1,375,589,000,000 (FY2022)
- Operating income: ▲¥64,563,000,000 (FY2022)
- Net income: ▲¥33,876,000,000 (FY2022)
- Website: jal.co.jp/ar

Japan Airlines (JAL) is a major Japanese airline headquartered in Shinagawa, Tokyo. The airline's main hubs are Tokyo's Narita and Haneda airports, as well as secondary hubs in Osaka's Kansai and Itami airports. The JAL group comprises Japan Airlines, Hokkaido Air System, J-Air, Japan Air Commuter, Japan Transocean Air and Ryukyu Air Commuter for domestic feeder services, and JAL Cargo for cargo and mail services, as well as low-cost carriers Zipair Tokyo and Jetstar Japan.

JAL was established in 1951 as a government-owned business and became the national airline of Japan in 1953. After over three decades of service and expansion, the airline was fully privatised in 1987. In 2002, the airline merged with Japan Air System (JAS), Japan's third-largest airline, and became the sixth-largest airline in the world by passengers carried. It went bankrupt in 2010 in the aftermath of the 2008 financial crisis and underwent significant restructuring. The airline returned to profitability and was relisted on the Tokyo Stock Exchange in 2011, although it has since lost its position as Japan's largest airline to All Nippon Airways.

JAL group operations include scheduled and non-scheduled international and domestic passenger and cargo services to 220 destinations in 35 countries worldwide, including codeshares. The group has a fleet of 279 aircraft. In the fiscal year ended 31 March 2009, the airline group carried over 52 million passengers and over 1.1 million tons of cargo and mail. Japan Airlines, J-Air, JAL Express, and Japan Transocean Air are members of the Oneworld airline alliance network.

== History ==
=== Founding ===
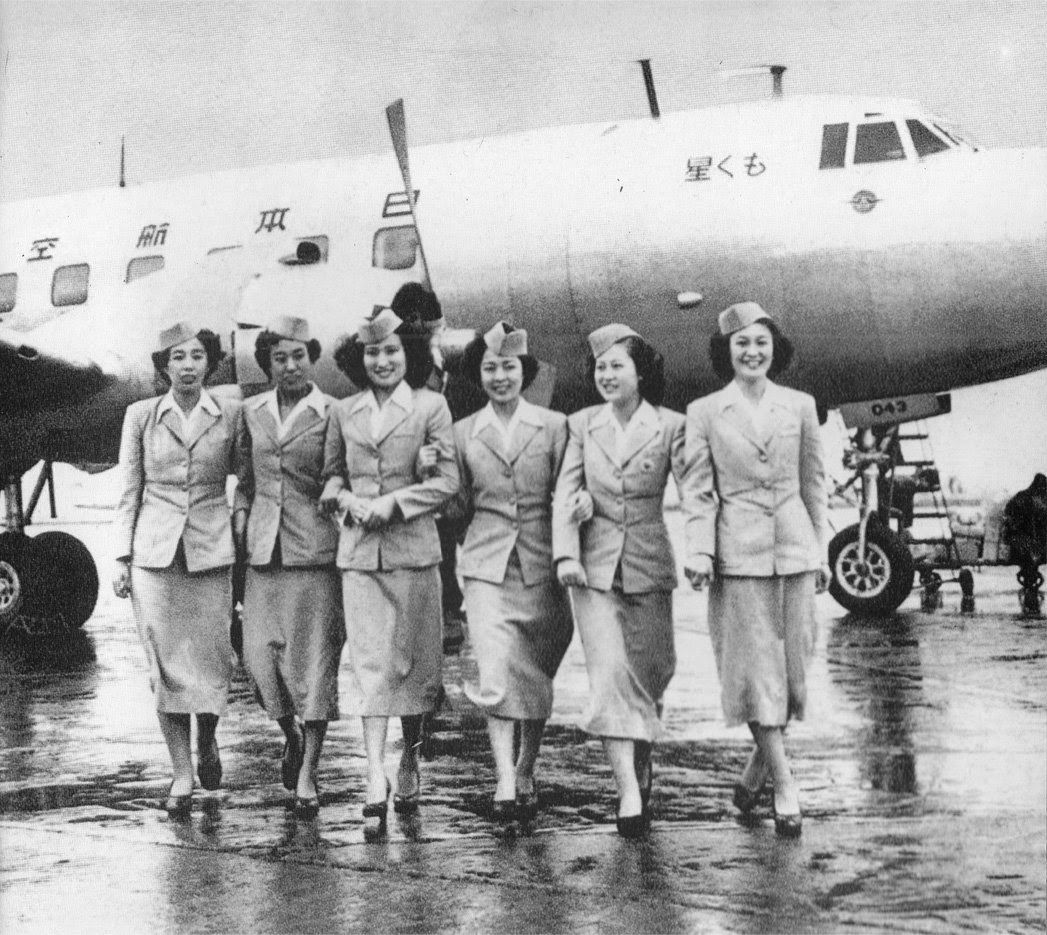
Japan Airlines flight attendants in front of Martin 2-0-2 Mokusei (もく星) on the occasion of the airline's inaugural flight, 25 October 1951

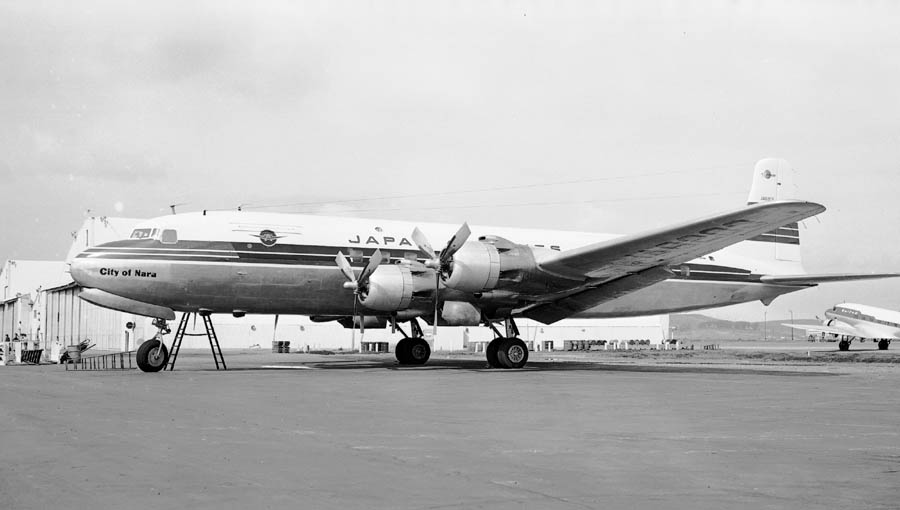
Japan Airlines Douglas DC-6A (named City of Nara) at San Francisco International Airport in March 1954

Japan Airlines Co. was established on 1 August 1951, with the government of Japan recognising the need for a reliable air transportation system to help Japan recover in the aftermath of World War II. The airline was founded with an initial capital of ¥100 million; its headquarters were located in Ginza, Chūō, Tokyo. Between 27 and 29 of August, the airline operated invitational flights on a Douglas DC-3 Kinsei, leased from Philippine Airlines. On 25 October, Japan's first post-war domestic airline service was inaugurated, using a Martin 2-0-2 aircraft, named Mokusei, and crew leased from Northwest Orient Airlines subsidiary TALOA.

On 1 August 1953, the National Diet passed the Japan Airlines Company Act (日本航空株式会社法, Nihon Kōkū Kabushiki-gaisha Hō) forming a new state-owned Japan Airlines on 1 October, which assumed all assets and liabilities of its private predecessor. By 1953, the JAL network extended northward from Tokyo to Sapporo and Misawa, and westward to Nagoya, Osaka, Iwakuni, and Fukuoka.

On 2 February 1954, the airline began international flights, carrying 18 passengers from Tokyo to San Francisco on a Douglas DC-6B City of Tokyo via Wake Island and Honolulu. The flights between Tokyo and San Francisco are still Flights 1 and 2, to commemorate its first international service. The early flights were advertised as being operated by American crews and serviced by United Airlines in San Francisco.

The airline, in addition to the Douglas DC-3, Douglas DC-6B, and Martin 2-0-2s, operated Douglas DC-4s and Douglas DC-7Cs during the 1950s. JAL flew to Hong Kong via Okinawa by 1955, having pared down its domestic network to Tokyo, Osaka, Fukuoka, and Sapporo. By 1958, the Hong Kong route had been extended to Bangkok and Singapore. With DC-7Cs, JAL was able to fly nonstop between Seattle and Tokyo in 1959.

=== Jet era ===
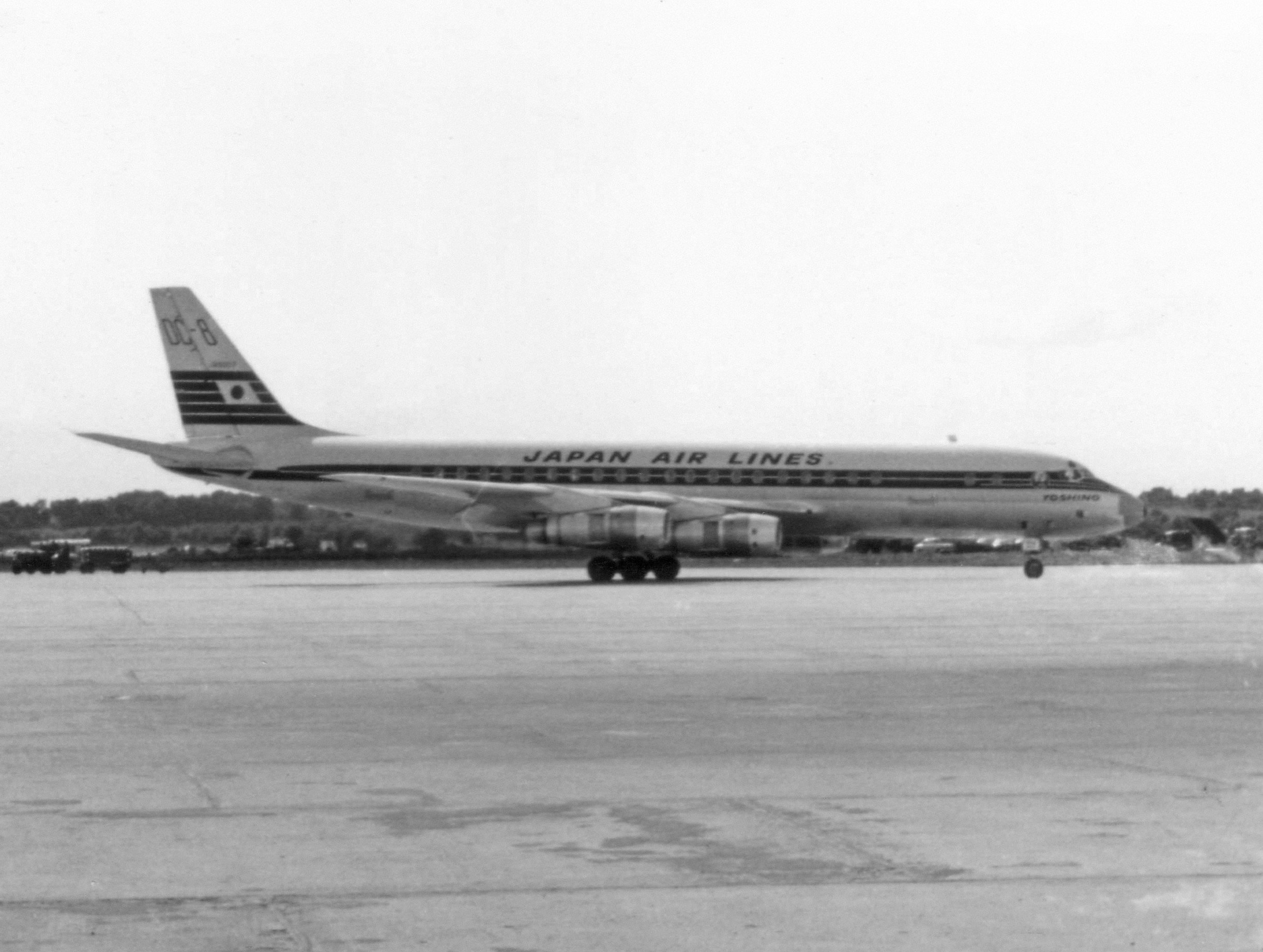
JAL's first jet, the Douglas DC-8, named Yoshino, in 1960

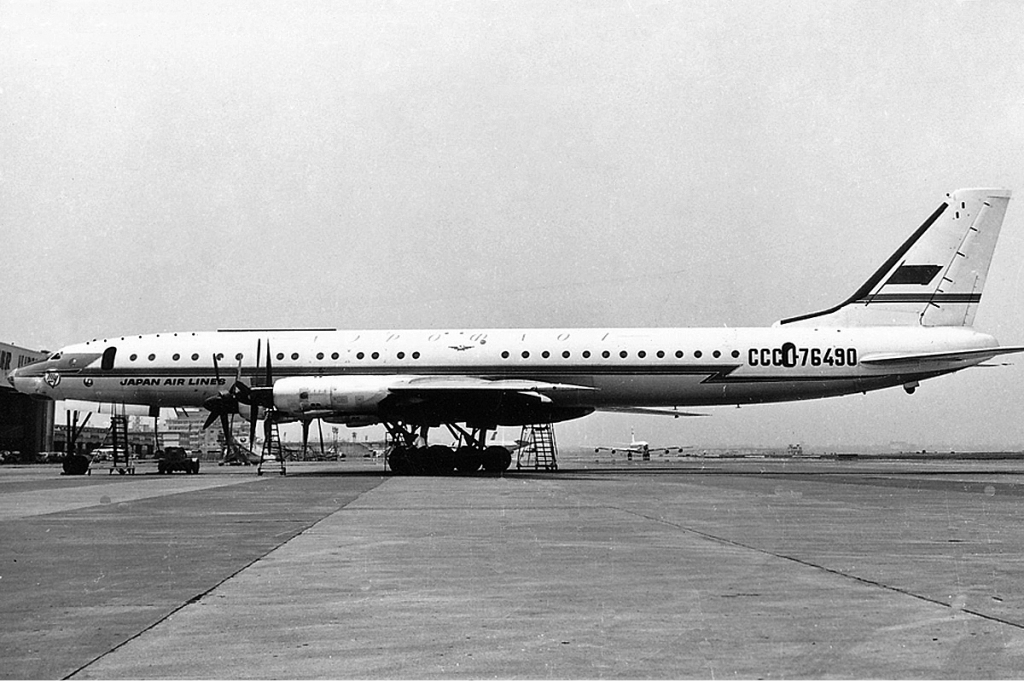
A Tupolev Tu-114 in Aeroflot/JAL livery, used between Japan and Europe via Moscow

In 1960, the airline took delivery of its first jet, a Douglas DC-8 named Fuji, introducing jet service on the Tokyo-Honolulu-San Francisco route. JAL went on to operate a fleet of 51 DC-8s, retiring the last of the type in 1987. Fuji flew until 1974 and was then used as a maintenance training platform until 1989; its nose section was stored at Haneda Airport and eventually put on public display at the JAL Sky Museum in March 2014.

JAL also began flying to Seattle and Hong Kong in 1960. At the end of 1961, JAL had transpolar flights from Tokyo to Seattle, Copenhagen, London, and Paris via Anchorage, Alaska, and to Los Angeles and San Francisco via Honolulu, Hawaii.

Revenue passenger-kilometers, scheduled flights only, in millions
Year	Traffic
1955	314
1960	873
1965	2938
1969	7485
1971	10427
1975	17547
1980	28876
1985	37299
1995	69775
2000	88999

During the 1960s, JAL flew to many new cities, including Moscow, New York, and Busan. DC-8 flights to Europe via Anchorage started in 1961; flights to Europe via India started in 1962, initially with Convair 880s. Under government pressure, Boeing 727s were acquired for domestic services in 1965 to allow the Japan Civil Aviation Bureau to issue an import license for All Nippon Airways' (ANA) own fleet of 727s.

By 1965, Japan Airlines was headquartered in the Tokyo Building in Marunouchi, Chiyoda, Tokyo. Around this time, over half of JAL's revenue was generated on transpacific routes to the United States, and the airline was lobbying the United States for fifth freedom rights to fly transatlantic routes from the East Coast. The transpacific route was extended east from San Francisco to New York in November 1966 and to London in 1967; flights between San Francisco and London ended in December 1972.

Between 1967 and 1969, JAL had an agreement with Aeroflot to operate a joint service between Tokyo and Moscow using a Soviet Tupolev Tu-114. The flight crew included one JAL member, and the cabin crew had five members each from Aeroflot and JAL. The weekly flight started in April 1967.

In 1972, under the 45/47 system (45/47体制, yongo-yonnana taisei), the so-called "aviation constitution" enacted by the Japanese government, JAL was granted flag carrier status to operate international routes. The airline was also designated to operate domestic trunk routes in competition with ANA and Toa Domestic Airlines.

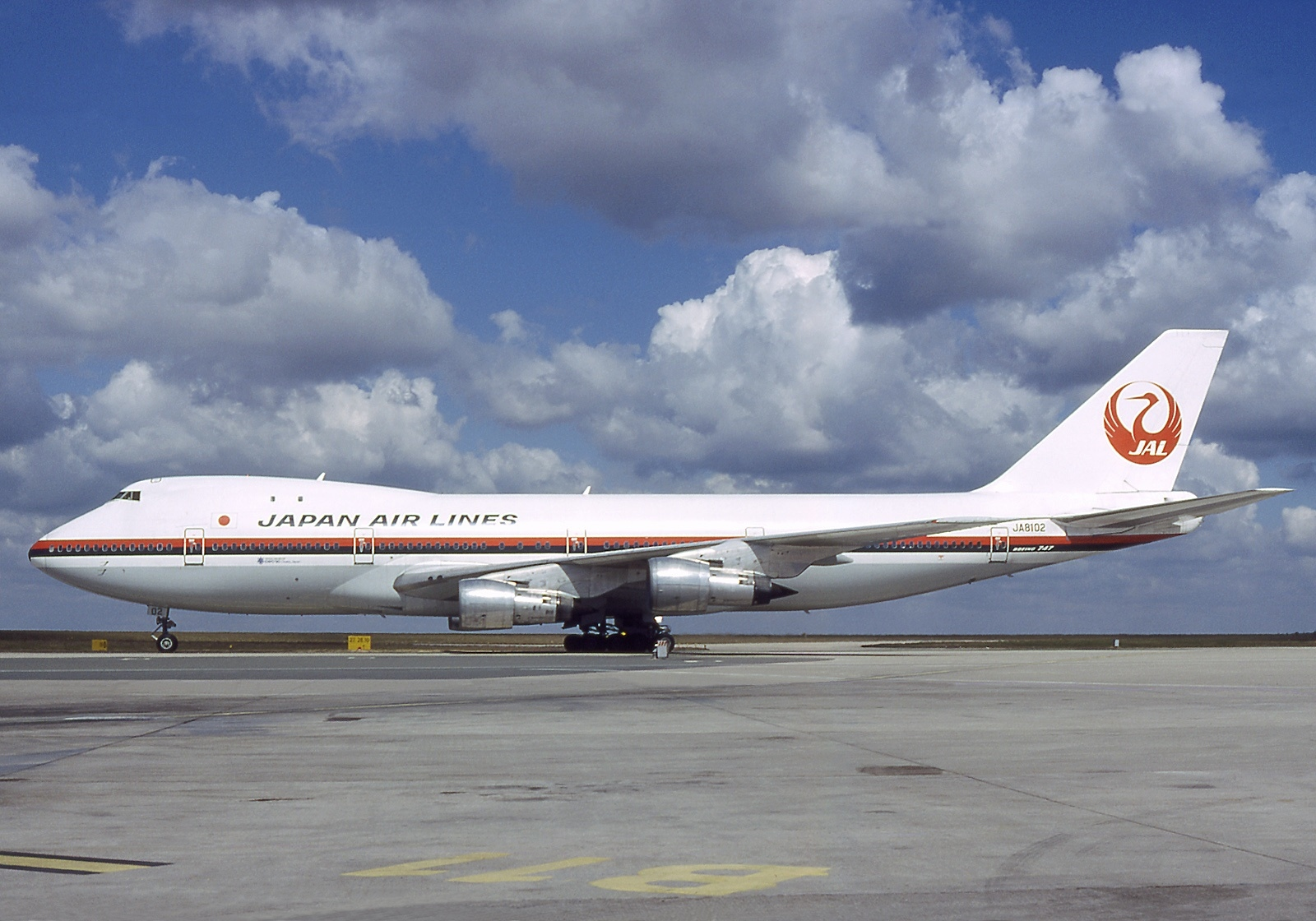
JAL was the largest operator of the Boeing 747, with 108 orders spanning most variants.

The signing of a civil air transport agreement between China and Japan on 20 April 1974 caused the suspension of air routes between Taiwan and Japan on 21 April. A new subsidiary, Japan Asia Airways, was established on 8 August 1975, and air services between the two countries were restored on 15 September. During the 1970s, the airline bought the Boeing 747 and McDonnell Douglas DC-10 for its growing routes within Japan and to other countries.

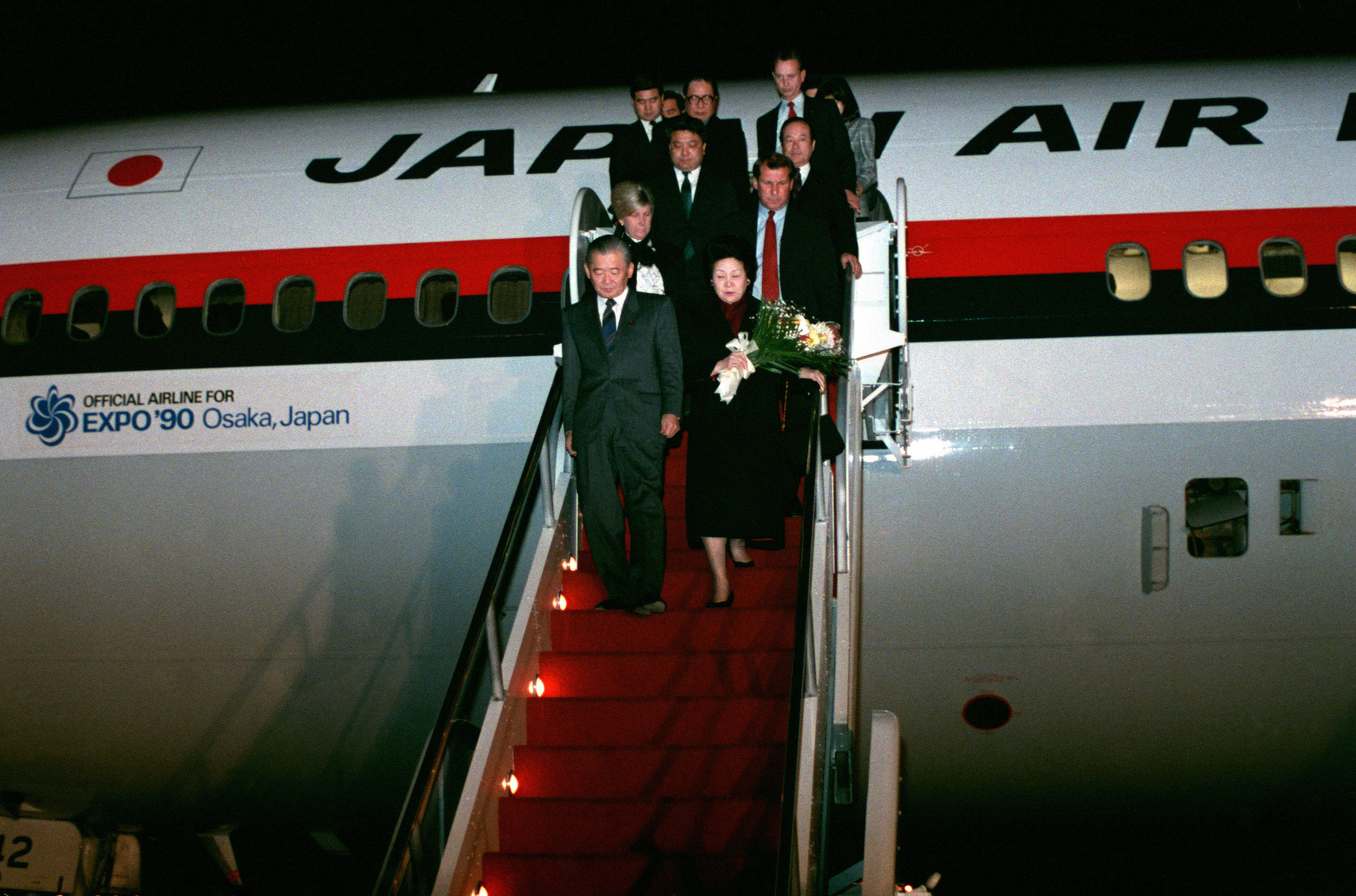
Prime Minister Noboru Takeshita disembarks from a JAL McDonnell Douglas DC-10 while on an official visit to the United States in 1989.

In the 1980s the airline performed special flights for the Crown Prince Akihito and Crown Princess Michiko of Japan, Pope John Paul II, and Japanese prime ministers. Until the introduction of dedicated government aircraft two Boeing 747-400s operated as Japanese Air Force One and Japanese Air Force Two. During that decade, the airline introduced new Boeing 747-100SR, Boeing 747-SUD, and Boeing 767 jets to the fleet and retired the Boeing 727s and Douglas DC-8s.

In 1978, JAL started flights to São Paulo and Rio de Janeiro via Anchorage and San Juan; The stopover was changed to Los Angeles in 1982 and to New York's John F. Kennedy International Airport in 1999. Until 2009, the airline operated fifth-freedom flights between New York and São Paulo and between Vancouver and Mexico City.

=== Deregulation and privatisation ===
Japan began considering airline deregulation in the late 1970s, with the government announcing the abandoning of the 45/47 system in 1985. In 1987, Japan Airlines was completely privatised, and the other two airlines in Japan, All Nippon Airways and Japan Air System, were permitted to compete with JAL on domestic and international routes. The increased competition resulted in changes to the airline's corporate structure, and it was reorganized into three divisions: international passenger service, domestic passenger service, and cargo (including mail) service. In 1988, JAL purchased a 7.5% shareholding in Air New Zealand. This was sold in 1994.

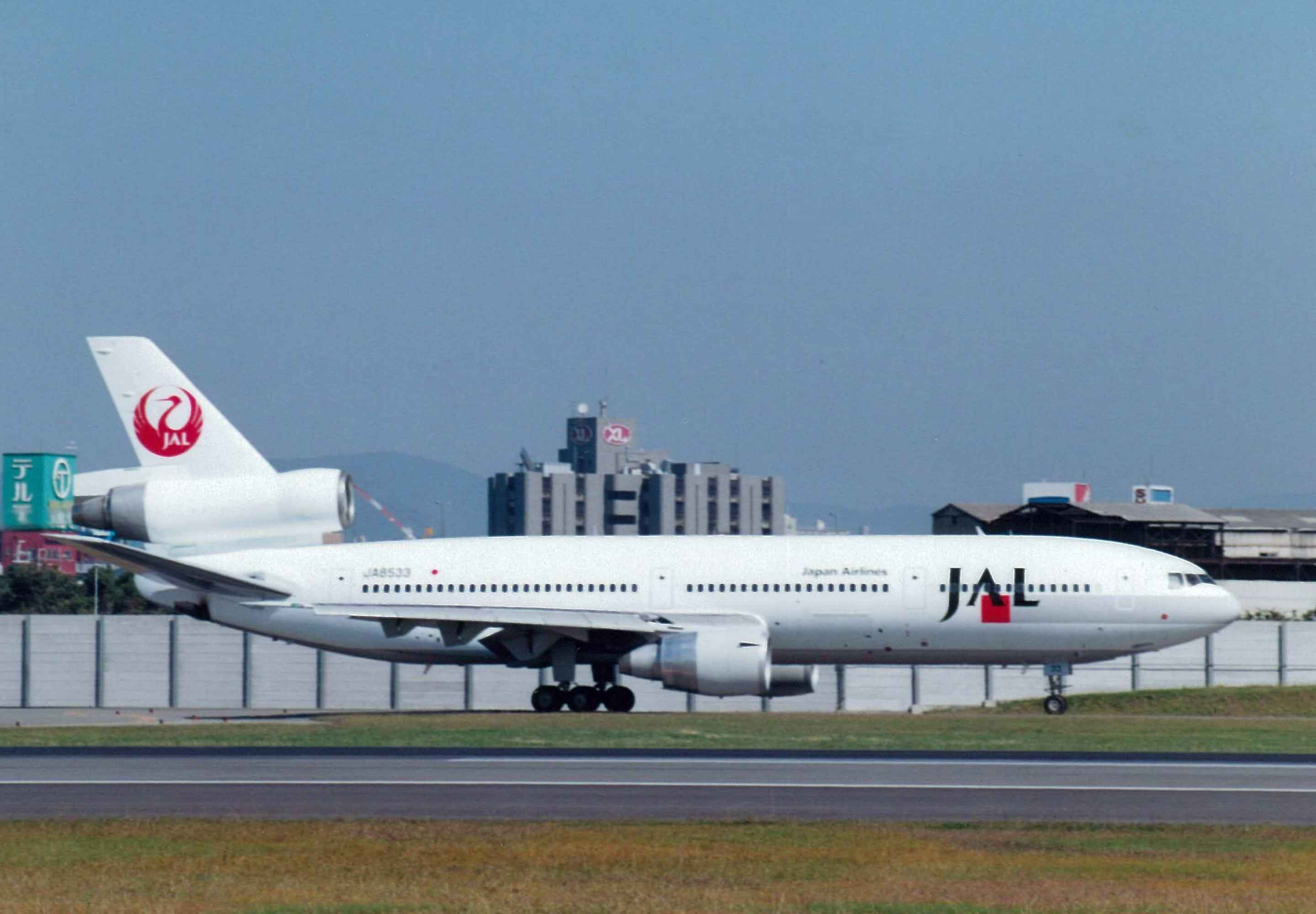
JAL McDonnell Douglas DC-10 in 1989 to 2002 livery

Japan Airlines began the 1990s with flights to evacuate Japanese citizens from Iraq before the start of the Gulf War. In October 1990, Japan Air Charter was established, and in September 1996, an agreement with the Walt Disney Company made Japan Airlines the official airline of Tokyo Disneyland. JAL Express was established in April 1997, with Boeing 737 aircraft. In the 1990s, the airline experienced economic difficulties that stemmed from recessions in the United States and the United Kingdom, as well as a domestic downturn. Despite years of profits since 1986, the airline began to report operating losses in 1992. Cost-cutting, including the formation of the low-cost JAL Express domestic subsidiary and the transfer of tourist operations to JALways (the successor to Japan Air Charter), helped return the airline to profitability in 1999.

In 1997, the airline flew Japanese Prime Minister Ryutaro Hashimoto to Peru to help negotiate in the Japanese embassy hostage crisis. Japan Airlines placed orders for Boeing 777s during the 1990s, allowing for fleet renewal. It was one of eight airlines participating in the Boeing 777 design process, shaping the design to their specifications.

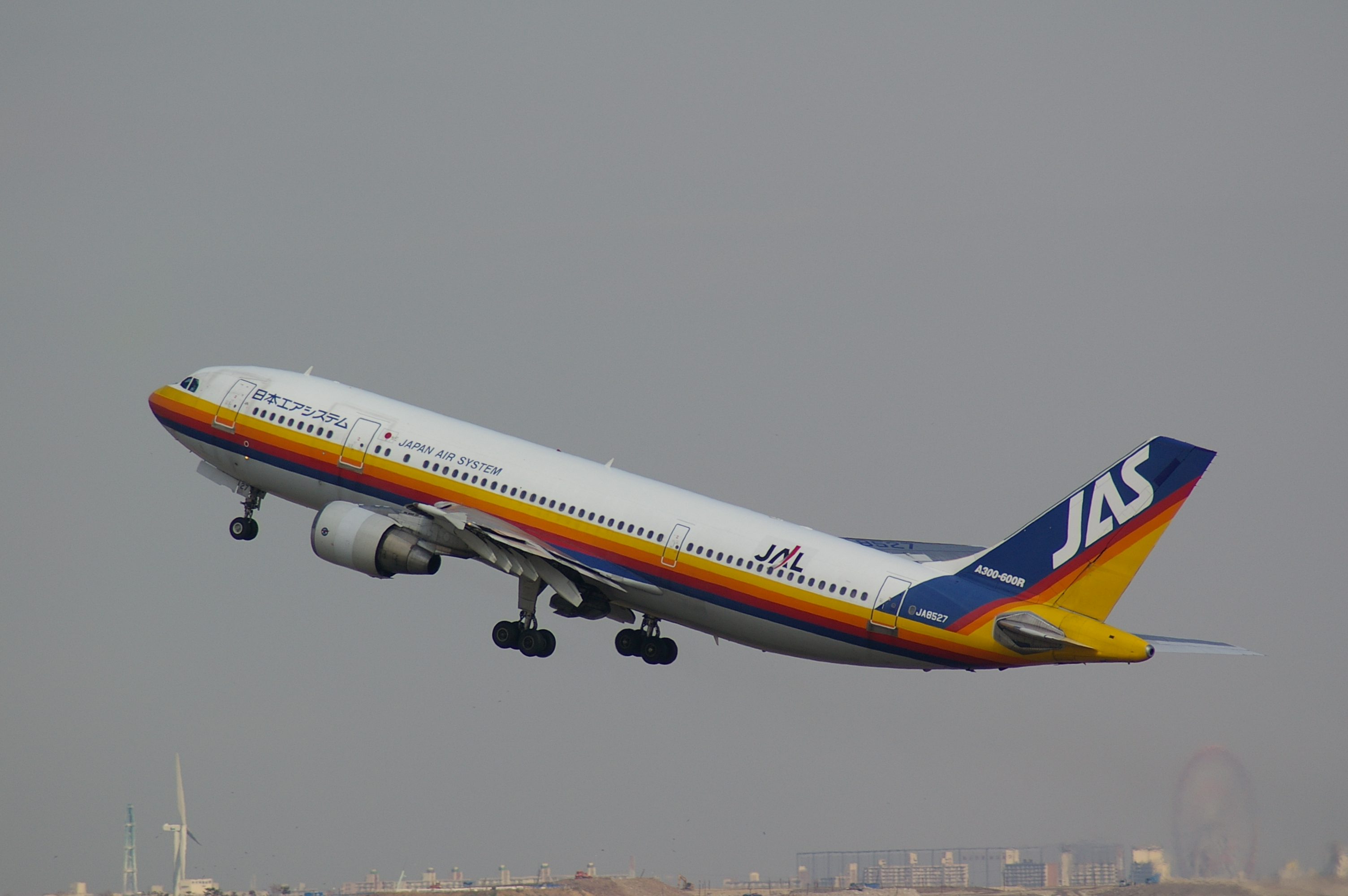
Japan Air System (JAS) Airbus A300-600R with JAL logo on the fuselage

In 2001, Japan Air System and Japan Airlines agreed to merge; and on 2 October 2002, they established a new holding company called Japan Airlines System (日本航空システム, Nihon Kōkū Shisutemu), forming a new core of the JAL Group. Aircraft liveries were changed to match the design of the new JAL Group. At that time, the merged group of airlines was the sixth largest in the world by passengers carried.

On 1 April 2004, JAL changed its name to Japan Airlines International and JAS changed its name to Japan Airlines Domestic. JAS flight codes were changed to JAL flight codes, JAS check-in desks were refitted in JAL livery, and JAS aircraft were gradually repainted. On 26 June 2004, the parent company Japan Airlines System was renamed Japan Airlines Corporation.

Following the merger, two companies operated under the JAL brand: Japan Airlines International (日本航空インターナショナル, Nihon Kōkū Intānashonaru) and Japan Airlines Domestic (日本航空ジャパン, Nihon Kōkū Japan). Japan Airlines Domestic had primary responsibility for JAL's large network of intra-Japan flights, while JAL International operated both international and trunk domestic flights. On 1 October 2006, Japan Airlines International and Japan Airlines Domestic merged into a single brand, Japan Airlines International.

The airline applied to join Oneworld on 25 October 2005. Japan Airlines claimed that its Oneworld membership would be in the best interests of the airline's plans to further develop the airline group and its strong commitment to providing the very best to its customers. Japan Airlines, together with Malév and Royal Jordanian, joined the alliance on 1 April 2007.

On 1 April 2008, JAL merged the operations of its subsidiary Japan Asia Airways (JAA) into JAL mainline operations. JAA had operated all JAL group flights between Japan and Taiwan between 1975 and 2008 as a separate entity due to the special political status of Taiwan.

=== 2008 financial crisis and bankruptcy ===
In 2009, Japan Airlines suffered steep financial losses, despite remaining Asia's largest airline by revenue. As a result, the airline embarked on staff cuts and route cutbacks in an effort to reduce costs. The carrier also received ¥100 billion through capital injection and credit from the Japanese government as part of the proposed bankruptcy. In September 2009, Japan's Ministry of Land, Infrastructure, Transport and Tourism formed a task force aimed at aiding a corporate turnaround at JAL, which examined various cost-cutting and strategic partnership proposals. Haruka Nishimatsu, the president and CEO of JAL, already known for eschewing many executive perks, cut his salary to the same amount that JAL pilots were earning during the financial crisis.

One proposal considered was to merge JAL with ANA, which would create a single larger international airline and replace Japan Airlines International; however, media reports suggested that ANA would oppose this proposal given its comparatively better financial performance as an independent carrier. The task force also examined possible partnerships with foreign carriers.

After weeks of speculation, JAL applied for protection under the Corporate Rehabilitation Law (the Japanese equivalent of Administration in the United Kingdom or a Chapter 11 bankruptcy filing in the United States) on 19 January 2010. JAL would receive a ¥300 billion cash injection and have debts worth ¥730 billion waived, in exchange for which it will cut its capital to zero, cut unprofitable routes and reduce its workforce by 15,700 employees—a third of its 47,000 total. JAL's main creditors (Mizuho Corporate Bank, Bank of Tokyo-Mitsubishi UFJ and Sumitomo Mitsui Banking Corporation) originally objected to the bankruptcy declaration, but changed their positions after the Enterprise Turnaround Initiative Corporation of Japan recommended court protection, according to a senior bank official. Shares of JAL were delisted from the Tokyo Stock Exchange on 20 February 2010. At a time, its stock was considered one of "bluest of blue chips" of Japan. At the time, the bankruptcy was the largest Japanese bankruptcy involving a non-financial company and the fourth largest in Japan's history.

Kazuo Inamori, founder of Kyocera and KDDI, took over as CEO of JAL. Transport minister Seiji Maehara personally visited Kyocera headquarters in late 2009 to persuade Inamori to accept the position; task force leader Shinjiro Takagi believed that appointing a proven entrepreneur CEO was necessary to fix the various problems at JAL. Japan Air Commuter president Masaru Onishi was promoted to president of JAL.

In May, JAL began to see an increase in its passenger numbers by 1.1% year-on-year. In August, it was reported that JAL would cut 19,133 jobs from its workforce of 47,000 by the end of March 2015 – whilst also increasing capacity – in an attempt to make the business viable.

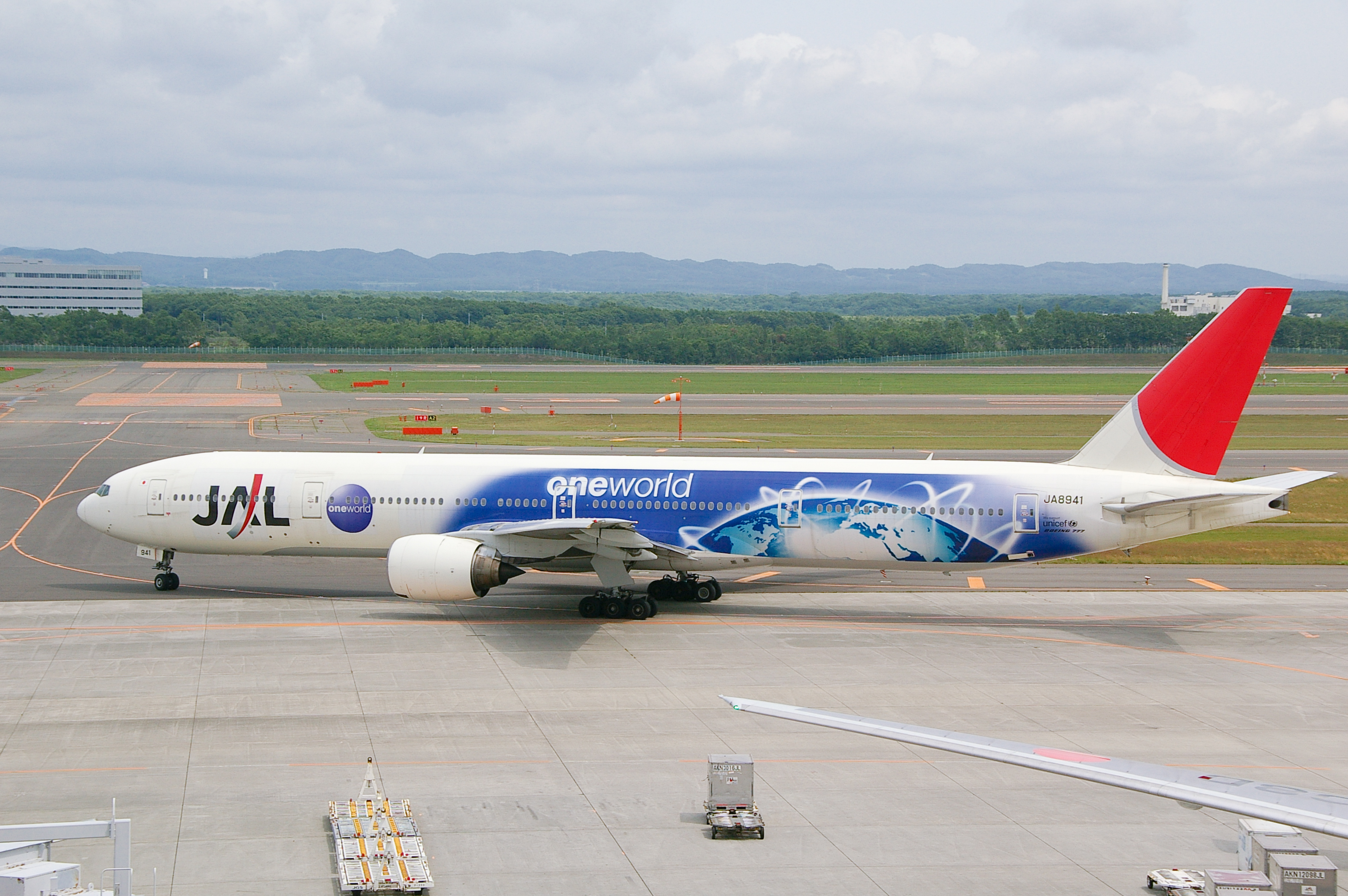
JAL Boeing 777-300 (JA8941) with special Oneworld livery

Although JAL ultimately exited bankruptcy while remaining in the Oneworld alliance, JAL was seriously considering accepting a strategic investment from Delta Air Lines and joining the SkyTeam alliance during the period between September 2009 and February 2010. JAL also had talks with Skyteam members Air France-KLM and Korean Air regarding their potential involvement.

The Delta deal was favored by the Ministry of Land, Infrastructure, Transport and Tourism because Delta had an extensive global network and had the largest Japanese operation of any foreign airline, which it had inherited through its merger with Northwest Airlines. MLITT also supported a transaction with Air France-KLM because it was a "healthier company" than American.

American planned to team up with Oneworld alliance members British Airways and Qantas to make a joint offer to recapitalise JAL. British Airways said that it was attempting to persuade JAL to remain part of Oneworld rather than aligning itself with Delta and SkyTeam, while American CEO Gerard Arpey said that American and Oneworld remained committed to a partnership with Japan Airlines, as long as it remained a major international carrier, and reiterated his encouragement for JAL to stay with Oneworld during ceremonies to welcome Mexicana into the alliance.

In an interview with the Asahi Shimbun on 1 January 2010, JAL president Haruka Nishimatsu stated his preference in forming a partnership with Delta over American, and the Yomiuri Shimbun reported shortly thereafter that JAL and the Japanese government-backed Enterprise Turnaround Initiative Corporation would likely choose to form a business and capital tie-up with Delta, as part of which JAL would enter SkyTeam and reduce its international flight operations in favor of code-share agreements with Delta, and that American Airlines had begun procedures to end negotiations with JAL. Both JAL and American denied the report. The Wall Street Journal then reported that American Airlines raised its JAL investment offer by $300 million, to $1.4 billion, and in separate comments to the press, Delta president Ed Bastian said that Delta was "willing and able to raise additional capital through third-party resources."

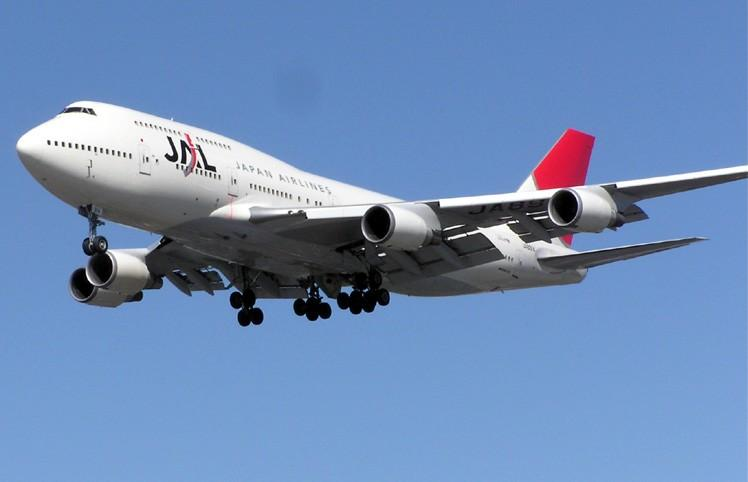
The final 747 was retired in early 2011 as part of the airline's restructuring program, marking the end of 41 years of 747 service.

After JAL filed for bankruptcy, there were further media reports that JAL would leave Oneworld in favour of SkyTeam, but JAL president Masaru Onishi said on 1 February that the new JAL leadership was "seriously reviewing the issue from scratch, without being influenced by previous discussions," and its decision on an alliance partner would be made soon.

On 7 February, several news outlets reported that JAL would decide to keep its alliance with American Airlines and end talks with Delta. Inamori and ETIC officials, according to the reports, decided that switching alliances from Oneworld to Skyteam would be too risky and could hinder JAL's ability to turn around quickly. Two days later, JAL officially announced that it would strengthen its partnership with American, including a joint application for antitrust immunity on transpacific routes. The airline would also fortify its relationship with other partners in the Oneworld alliance.

=== Relisting and re-expansion ===
JAL emerged from bankruptcy protection in March 2011. In July, ETIC selected Nomura Holdings, Daiwa Securities, MUFG Bank, Morgan Stanley, Mizuho Securities, SMBC, and Nikko Securities to underwrite the sale of its equity stake in JAL, without specifying amounts or dates. On 6 January 2012, JAL announced its intent to relist its shares on the Tokyo Stock Exchange in an initial public offering (IPO) of up to ¥1 trillion, which would be the largest offering in Japan in more than a year. The airline completed its IPO on the first section of the Tokyo Stock Exchange (TYO: 9201) on 19 September 2012. The Enterprise Turnaround Initiative Corporation of Japan sold all its holdings (96.5%) in JAL for ¥650 billion, greater than its ¥350 billion investment in 2010.

Following its exit from bankruptcy protection, JAL began several new partnerships within the Oneworld alliance. The transpacific joint venture between JAL and American commenced in April 2011. JAL formed Jetstar Japan, a low-cost carrier joint venture with Qantas subsidiary Jetstar Airways, in July. In 2012, JAL and British Airways parent company International Airlines Group (IAG) submitted applications to the Japanese government and European Union respectively in seeking a joint venture business operation for flights between Japan and Europe. Finnair applied to join the JV with IAG in July 2013, in conjunction with JAL starting new nonstop service to Helsinki.

=== COVID-19 pandemic ===
Between 2020 and 2021, Japan Airlines incorporated numerous safety measures to prevent the spread of COVID-19. Japan Airlines undertakes JAL FlySafe hygiene measures to prevent the spread of the virus, to provide all Japan Airlines guests with a safe and secure travel experience. Measures taken by Japan Airlines to protect guests and keep them safe from infection include face masks and face guards worn by airport staff, disinfecting areas around seats, including tables, armrests, screens, and controllers, and sanitizing frequently touched surfaces, such as lavatory doorknobs and faucet handles.

On June 18, 2021, Japan airlines announced it had conducted the first flight with loading two different types of Sustainable Aviation Fuel produced domestically in Japan. The flight was directed from Tokyo (Haneda) to Sapporo (Shin-Chitose) and used 3,132 litters (9.1% mixing ratio) of SAF sourced from wood chips and from microalgae. It was the first flight in the world to use biofuel derived from gasified wood chips and to mix two different types of biofuels.

In May 2023, JAL announced its intention to reintroduce dedicated cargo service using Boeing 767-300BCF aircraft converted from its passenger fleet. This service is planned to begin in early 2024. The company retired its previous fleet of Boeing 747 freighters in 2011.

=== Recent events ===
In February 2026, Qantas announced it will exit its 33.3% stake in Jetstar Japan by July 2026, ending its 14-year joint venture with Japan Airlines and Tokyo Century. The low-cost carrier will rebrand by June 2027.

== Senior management ==
- Chairman: Yuji Akasaka (since April 2024)
- President and CEO: Mitsuko Tottori (since April 2024)

In January 2024, the company announced that Mitsuko Tottori would succeed Yuji Akasaka as president. As of 1 April 2024, Tottori became the first female president in the history of the company. She began her career as a flight attendant at Toa Domestic Airlines in 1985 after graduating from a two-year college. With over 30 years of experience as a flight attendant, Tottori was the senior managing director in charge of cabin safety and passenger service. Akasaka replaced Yoshiharu Ueki as chairman.

=== List of former chairmen ===
1. Aiichirō Fujiyama (1951–1953)
2. Kunizo Hara (1953–1960)
3. Kōgorō Uemura (1960–1969)
4. Teruo Godo (1969–1971)
5. Shizuma Matsuo (1971–1972)
6. Ataru Kobayashi (1973–1977)
7. Kōgorō Uemura (1977–1978); second term
8. Shozo Hotta (1979–1981)
9. Shizuo Asada (1981–1983)
10. Nihachiro Hanamura (1983–1986)
11. Junji Itoh (1986–1988)
12. Fumio Watanabe (1988–1991)
13. Susumu Yamaji (1991–1998)
14. Isao Kaneko (2003–2005)
15. Toshiyuki Shinmachi (2006–2010)
16. Kazuo Inamori (2010–2012)
17. Masaru Onishi (2012–2018)
18. Yoshiharu Ueki (2018–2024)

=== List of former presidents and CEOs ===
1. Seijiro Yanagida (1951–1961)
2. Shizuma Matsuo (1961–1971)
3. Shizuo Asada (1971–1981)
4. Yasumoto Takagi (1981–1985)
5. Susumu Yamaji (1985–1990)
6. Matsuo Toshimitsu (1990–1995)
7. Akira Kondo (1995–1998)
8. Isao Kaneko (1998–2005)
9. Toshiyuki Shinmachi (2005–2006)
10. Haruka Nishimatsu (2006–2010)
11. Masaru Onishi (2010–2012)
12. Yoshiharu Ueki (2012–2018)
13. Yuji Akasaka (2018–2024)

== Corporate affairs and identity ==
=== Business trends ===
The key trends of Japan Airlines are (as at the financial year ending March 31):

Year	Revenue (¥ bn)	Net income (¥ bn)
2018	1,487	150
2019	1,385	48.0
2020	481	–286
2021	682	–177
2022	1,375	34.4

=== Organization ===
Subsidiaries and affiliates of Japan Airlines

In addition to its operations under the JAL name, the airline owns five domestic airlines which feed or supplement mainline JAL flights:

- J-Air (JLJ) (member of oneworld) – regional jet services based in Itami Airport
- Japan Air Commuter (JAC) (member of oneworld) – turboprop services based in Kagoshima and several destinations out of Kagoshima
- Hokkaido Air System (HAC) (member of oneworld) – turboprop services based in Hokkaido and several destinations out of Hokkaido
- Japan Transocean Air (JTA) (member of oneworld) – jet services from/to Okinawa
- Ryukyu Air Commuter (RAC) – turboprop services based in Okinawa

Former subsidiaries:

- JALways was the airline's international subsidiary, which handled low-yield flights to resort destinations in Hawaii, Oceania, and Southeast Asia.
- JAL Express (JEX) was the airline's low-cost carrier for jet services between secondary cities, it merged into Japan Airlines in 2014.
- Japan Asia Airways (JAA) was the airline's subsidiary formed in 1975 to allow JAL to fly to the Republic of China (Taiwan) without compromising traffic rights held by the airline for destinations in the People's Republic of China (PRC). The mainland does not recognize Taiwan as a sovereign nation but instead as a breakaway province and threatened to ban any foreign airline that has a Taiwan route from flying to the mainland. Japan Asia Airways was dissolved in 2008 when JAL was privatized, allowing the airline to fly to Taiwan in its own right.

JALUX Inc., established in 1962, is the airline's procurement business which handles various work for the company, including the JAL SELECTION merchandise and in-flight meals and refreshments, supplies for Blue Sky and JAL-DFS shops, aircraft fuel components, cabin services, and in-flight duty-free. JALUX merged with JAS Trading on 1 January 2004, to unify support operations for the JAL group.

JAL Cargo is the brand of the airline group's freight service and is a member of the WOW cargo alliance with these products: J Speed, General Cargo, and Dangerous Goods. In the fiscal year ended 31 March 2009, the cargo division carried 500,779 tonnes of freight domestically and 627,213 tonnes of freight internationally.

On 1 April 2011, the airline changed its trade name from Japan Airlines International Co., Ltd (株式会社日本航空インターナショナル, Kabushiki-gaisha Nihon Kōkū Intānashonaru) to Japan Airlines Co., Ltd (日本航空株式会社, Nihon Kōkū Kabushiki-gaisha). in the first quarter of 2019, JAL launches its low-cost carrier, Zipair Tokyo, which will focus on medium to long-haul destinations. It is estimated to commence operation in summer 2020.

=== Headquarters ===
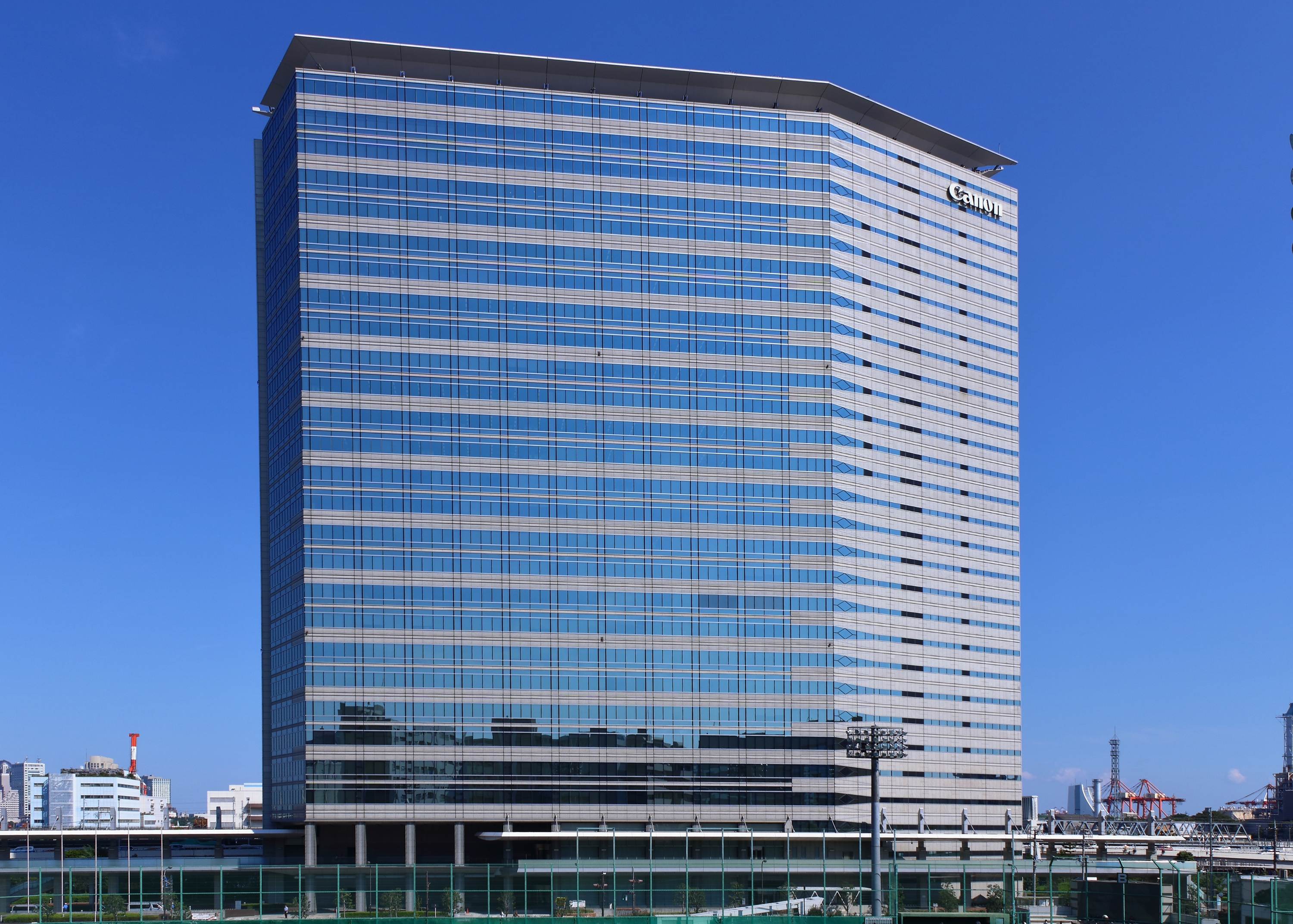
Japan Airlines headquarters in Shinagawa, Tokyo

The headquarters, the Nomura Fudosan Tennozu Building (野村不動産天王洲ビル, Nomura Fudōsan Tennōzu Biru), is located on Tennōzu Isle in Higashi Shinagawa, Shinagawa, Tokyo. The 26-floor building was a project of the Kajima Corporation. The building, which also has two underground levels, has a land area of 11,670.4 square metres (125,619 sq ft) and a floor area of 82,602.11 square metres (889,121.7 sq ft).

Several divisions of JAL, including JALPAK, JAL Aero-Consulting, and JAL Hotels are located in the building. The building also houses the Japan office of American Airlines. It is also known as the JAL Building (ＪＡＬビルディング, JAL Birudingu), the Japan Airlines Headquarters, and the Shinagawa Kyodo Building.

When JAL was originally established in 1951, its headquarters were in Ginza, Chuo, Tokyo. By 1965, Japan Airlines was headquartered in the Tokyo Building in Marunouchi, Chiyoda, Tokyo. The Yomiuri Shimbun stated that because Japan Airlines worked closely with the Japanese government, people mockingly referred to the Tokyo Building as "a branch office of the transport ministry."

On 28 June 1996, construction was completed on the JAL Building. On 27 July 1996, JAL moved its headquarters into the JAL Building. The Flight Operation Center at the JAL Building began on 20 September 1996. A holding company for JAL and Japan Airlines System, a carrier merging into JAL, was established on 2 October 2002; the head office of that company, Japan Airlines System (JALS) (日本航空システム, Nihon Kōkū Shisutemu), was in 2-15-1 Kōnan in Shinagawa Intercity, Minato, Tokyo. On 11 August 2003, the headquarters of JAS moved from Haneda Maintenance Center 1 to the JAL Building. On 25 November 2003, the JALS headquarters moved to the JAL Building. Originally the JAL Building was co-owned by Japan Airlines and Mitsubishi Trading Co.; they co-owned a subsidiary that owned the JAL Building. In 2004, the building was to be sold to Nomura Real Estate for 65 billion yen. The contract date was 1 December 2004, and the handover date was 18 March 2005.

The JAL Subsidiary JALUX Inc. at one time had its headquarters in the JAL Building. One group of employees moved out of the building on 26 July 2010, and one moved out on 2 August 2010.

=== Livery ===
==== Logo and basic liveries ====
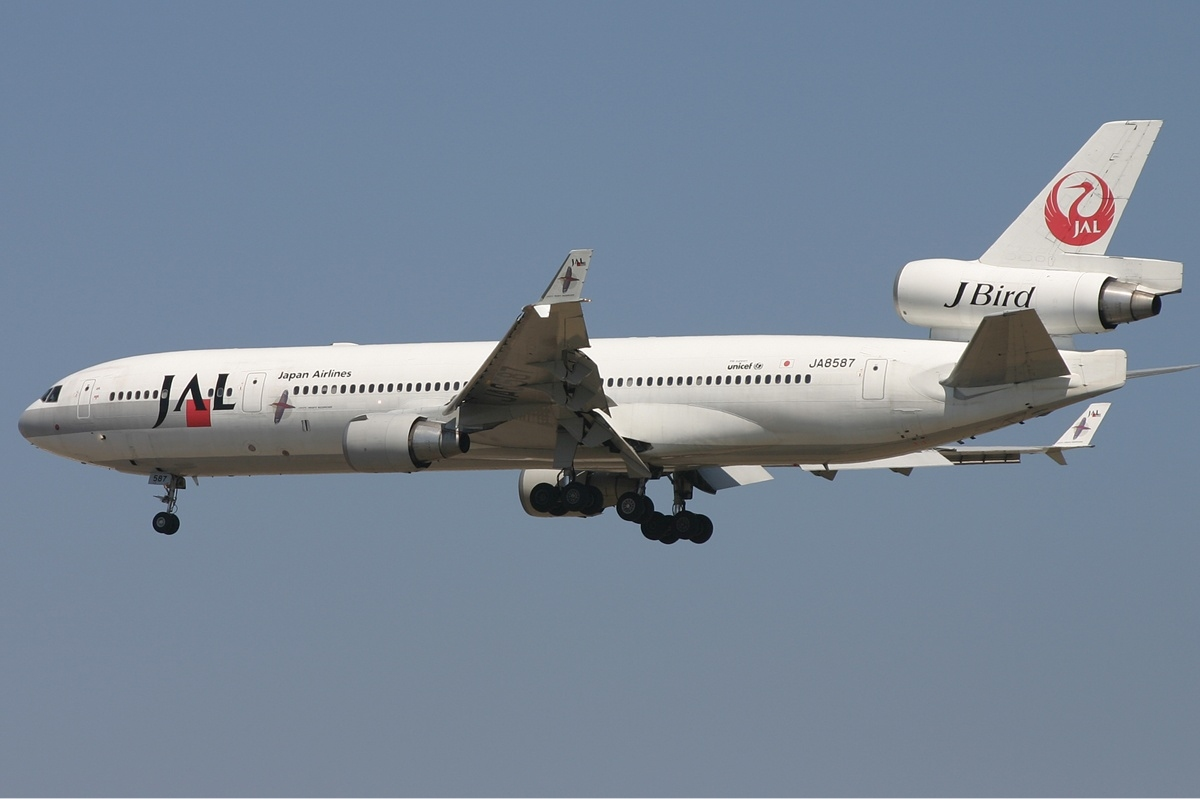
A former Japan Airlines McDonnell Douglas MD-11 in the 1990s tsurumaru livery

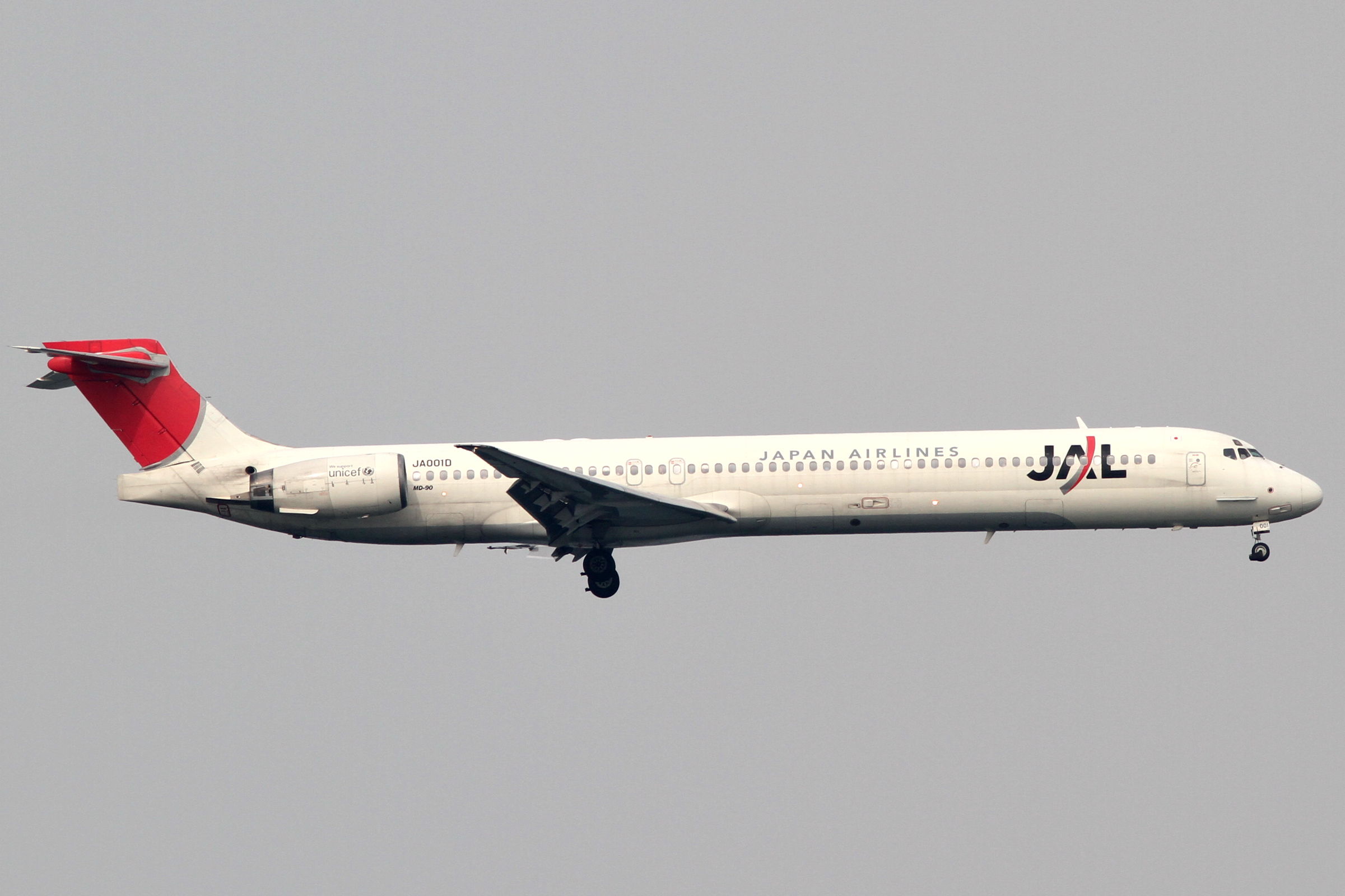
A former Japan Airlines McDonnell-Douglas MD-90 in the former Arc of the Sun livery

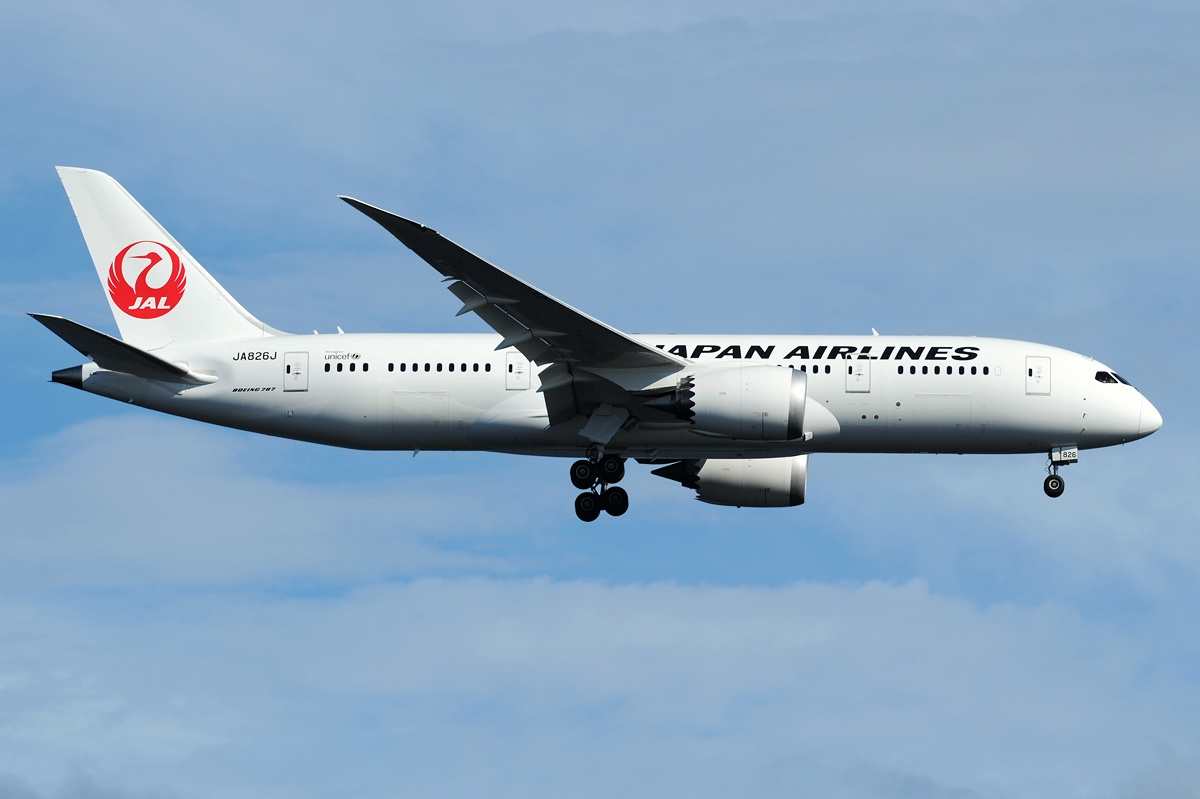
Japan Airlines Boeing 787-8 in the current tsurumaru livery

The JAL livery is called the tsurumaru (鶴丸) or "crane circle." It is an image of a Japanese red-crown crane with its wings extended in full flight. The Tsurumaru JAL logo was created in 1958 by Jerry Huff, the creative director at Botsford, Constantine and Gardner of San Francisco, which had been the advertising agency for Japan Airlines from its earliest days. JAL had used several logos up until 1958. When the airline arranged to buy new Douglas DC-8s, it decided to create a new official logo for the inauguration of its jet service worldwide.

In the creation of the logo, Huff was inspired by the personal crests of Samurai families. In a book he'd been given, We Japanese, he found pages of crests, including the crane. On his choice of the crane, he writes: "I had faith that it was the perfect symbol for Japan Airlines. I found that the Crane myth was all positive—it mates for life (loyalty), and flies high for miles without tiring (strength)".

The tsurumaru livery was in use until 2002 when it was replaced by a livery called the "Arc of the Sun." The livery featured the motif of a rising sun on a creamy parchment-colored background.

JAL is a strong supporter of UNICEF and expresses its support by having a "We Support UNICEF" logo on each aircraft.

Following its corporate restructuring, Japan Airlines returned to the classic tsurumaru logo starting on 1 April 2011. A Boeing 767-300 (JA8299) was the last remaining aircraft that had the "Arc of the Sun" livery until it was retired in January 2016.

==== Special liveries ====
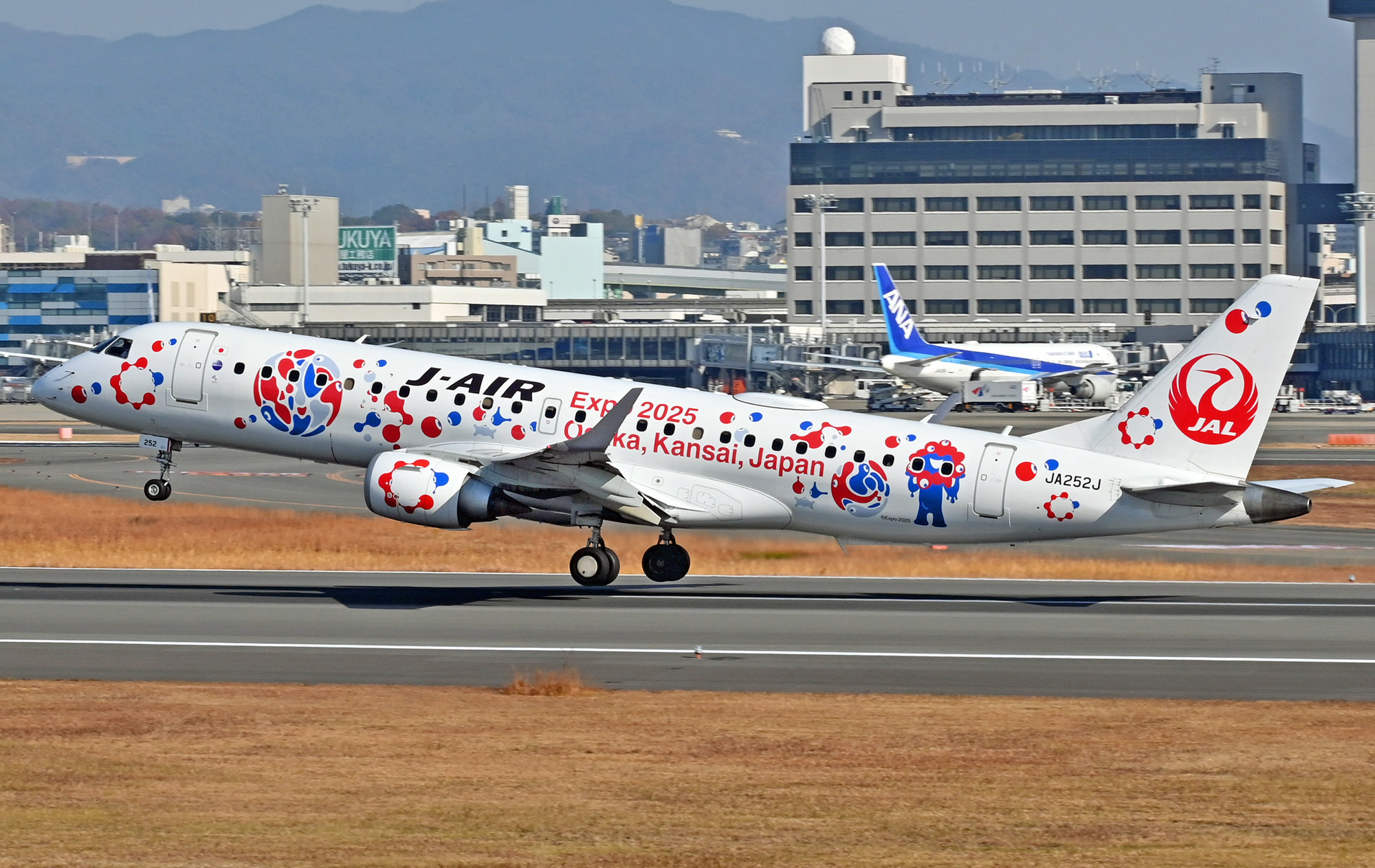
J-Air Embraer E190 with Expo 2025 livery

JAL is known for adopting special liveries. A Boeing 747 (JA8908) carried a World Cup soccer livery in 2002. Another Boeing 747 (JA8907) was the Matsui Jet, featuring the famous Japanese baseball player Hideki Matsui in 2003. One of the airline's Boeing 767-300 (JA8253) was the Expo 2005 aircraft.

Various aircraft in the JAL fleet also carry a Yokoso Japan logo supporting the Visit Japan campaign, in various forms. In late 2005, Japan Airlines began using a Boeing 777 (JA8941), featuring Japanese actor Shingo Katori on one side, and the television series Saiyuki, along with its main character "Goku" on the other side.

JAL has also been known for its liveries featuring Tokyo Disneyland and Tokyo DisneySea, as it is the official airline of the Tokyo Disney Resort. It sponsors the attraction Star Jets (not related to past Star Jets fleet with the old tsurumaru livery), which features a variation of the current livery on the ride vehicles. At one time there were more than six widebody aircraft painted with the special liveries.

Some Boeing 747s of JAL had also been painted with tropical-influenced liveries along with Reso'cha titles. These aircraft were typically used by JALways on charter flights to holiday destinations in the Pacific, such as Hawaii. Reso'cha was a marketing abbreviation for Resort Charter and were formerly known as JAL Super Resort Express.

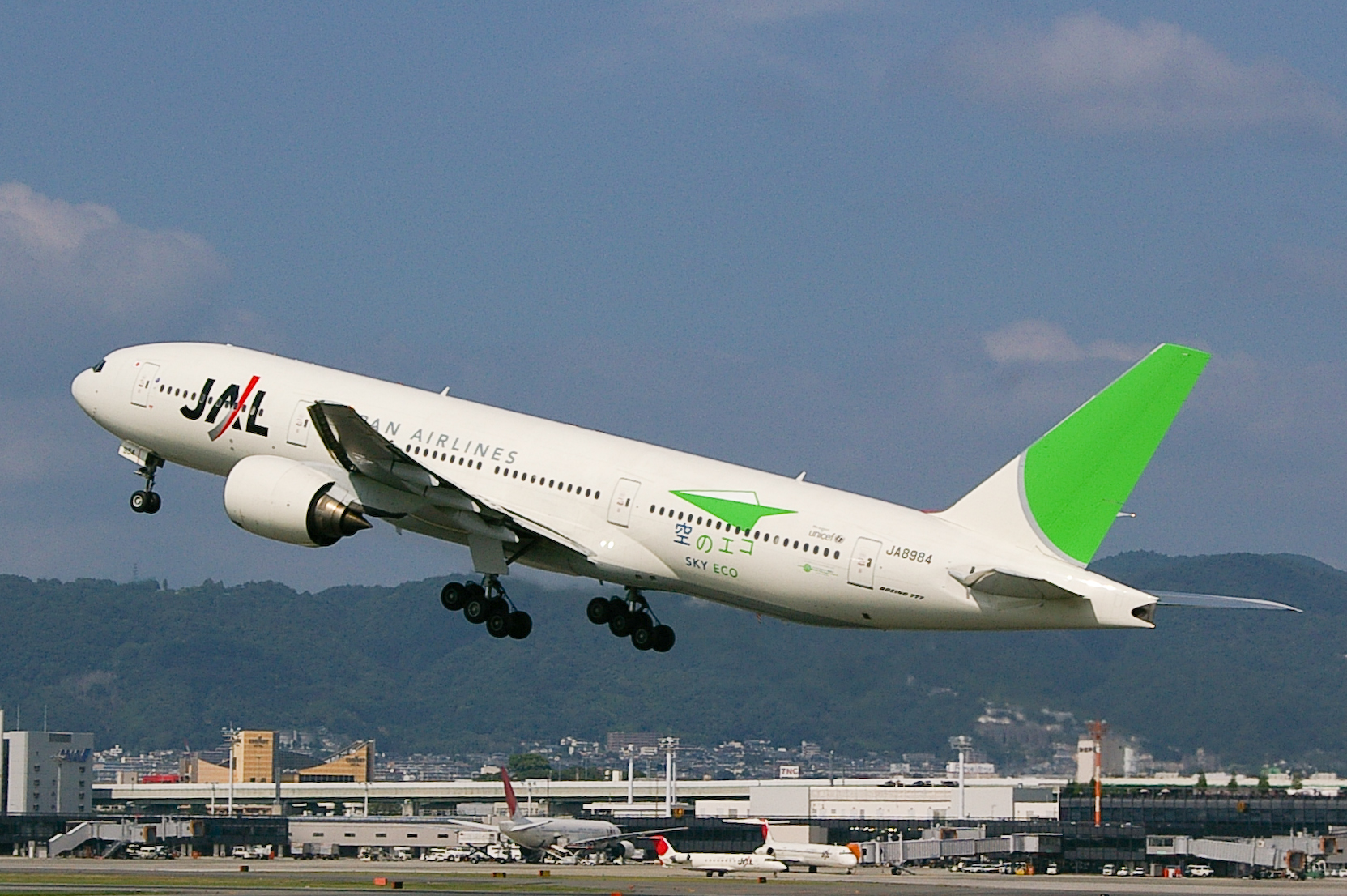
JAL Eco Jet

In April 2007, JAL debuted a Boeing 777-300 (JA8941, since moved to JA752J) with a special Oneworld livery to promote the airline's entry to the global airline alliance.

JAL repainted a Boeing 777-200 (JA8984) in 2008 and a Boeing 777-300ER (JA731J) in 2009 to have a green rather than red arc on its tail, along with a green origami airplane on the fuselage, and named them the Eco Jet, to highlight the company's efforts to reduce the environmental impact of commercial aviation. Following the brand image change to the third Tsurumaru livery, JAL redesigned the 2 Eco Jet liveries. JA8984's livery was removed in April 2019 prior to its retirement in December 2019 while JA731J's livery was moved onto JA734J (another JAL 777-300ER).

In 2009, JAL repainted JA8941 again, as well as a JTA 737-400 (JA8933) to promote Kobukuro and their new album Calling as well as a live concert tour in Okinawa and around Japan. This livery was released officially on 30 July 2009.

On 4 September 2010, in conjunction with the Boku no Miteiru Fūkei album, JAL and Arashi (one of their songs, "Movin' On", is used for a commercial) introduced a new livery on one of its Boeing 777-200 JA8982 featuring the five members of Arashi in the aircraft; the first flight was on the next day, 5 September. In May 2019, JAL also painted one of its Boeing 787-9 JA873J the ARASHI HAWAII JET livery, and in November, painted an Airbus A350-900 JA04XJ the 20th ARASHI THANKS JET livery to celebrate the band's 20th anniversary.

On 3 August 2017, JAL announced a new livery on board an Embraer 190 of subsidiary J-Air, in commemoration of the new Despicable Me: Minion Mayhem ride in Universal Studios Japan.

Starting from April 2019, JAL introduced the 'Tokyo 2020, Fly For it!' series of special liveries, in commemoration of the upcoming 2020 Summer Olympics and featuring the two mascots . Two jetliners in the JAL fleet have been painted so far, JA773J (a Boeing 777-200, painted April 2019) and JA601J (a Boeing 767-300ER, painted July 2019)

In December 2022, JAL and The Walt Disney Company Japan introduced a special livery on its Boeing 767-300ER JA615J in commemoration of the upcoming "Disney 100 Years of Wonder" celebration for Walt Disney Company's 100th anniversary in 2023.

=== Branding ===
In 1959, Japan Airlines adopted their logo, which is a crane known as the 'Tsuru' crane, along with a livery featuring a white top with the text "JAPAN AIR LINES" in capital italic letters, an exposed-metal bottom, and red and dark blue pinstripes separating the two.

Landor Associates created JAL's 1989 brand identity, along with a livery that featured a new stylized JAL initialism with a red square and grey band on the front of fuselage, and the name "Japan Airlines" featured in small black text. The 1989 livery retained the 'Tsuru' crane logo on the tail but with the same stylised JAL lettering incorporated within it.

After Japan Airlines and Japan Air System merged in 2004, the Tokyo office of Landor and JAL worked together again to create a new brand identity. Landor devised a livery referred to as the "Arc of the Sun". The 2000s rebranding began in April 2002 and was completed in April 2004. The brand identity firm designed 300,000 specific items for JAL. The JAL acronym remained, but it was changed to include a curved bar, which replaced the simple red square and gray rectangle used from 1989. The curved bar was likened to a samurai sword. The tail now featured a quarter sun outlined in silver.

JAL changed its branding again on 1 April 2011 as part of their post-bankruptcy restructuring. The new livery was reminiscent of the original 1959 one, featured the tsurumaru back on the vertical stabilizer and the full name in capital italic letters above the windows, but did not include the pinstripes or exposed metal bottom, and retained the two-word "JAPAN AIRLINES" spelling over the original "JAPAN AIR LINES". Repainting was completed in January 2016.

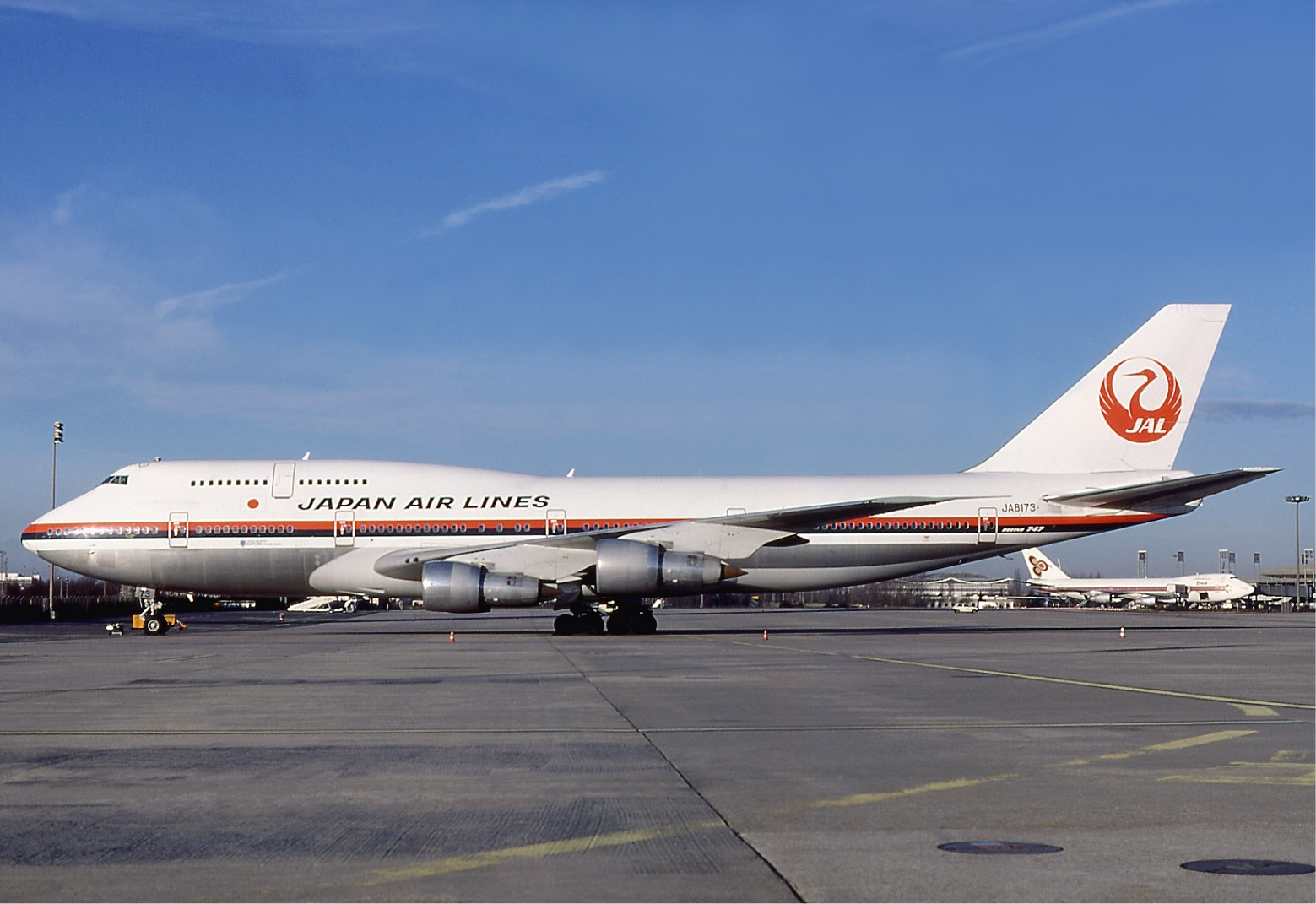
1959–1989

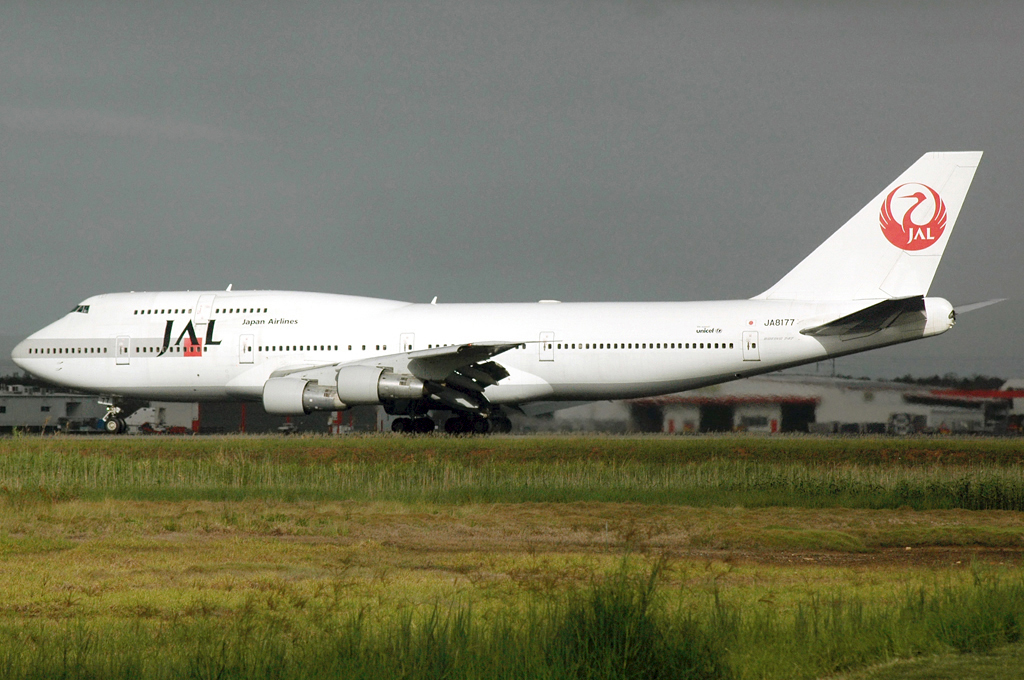
1989–2002

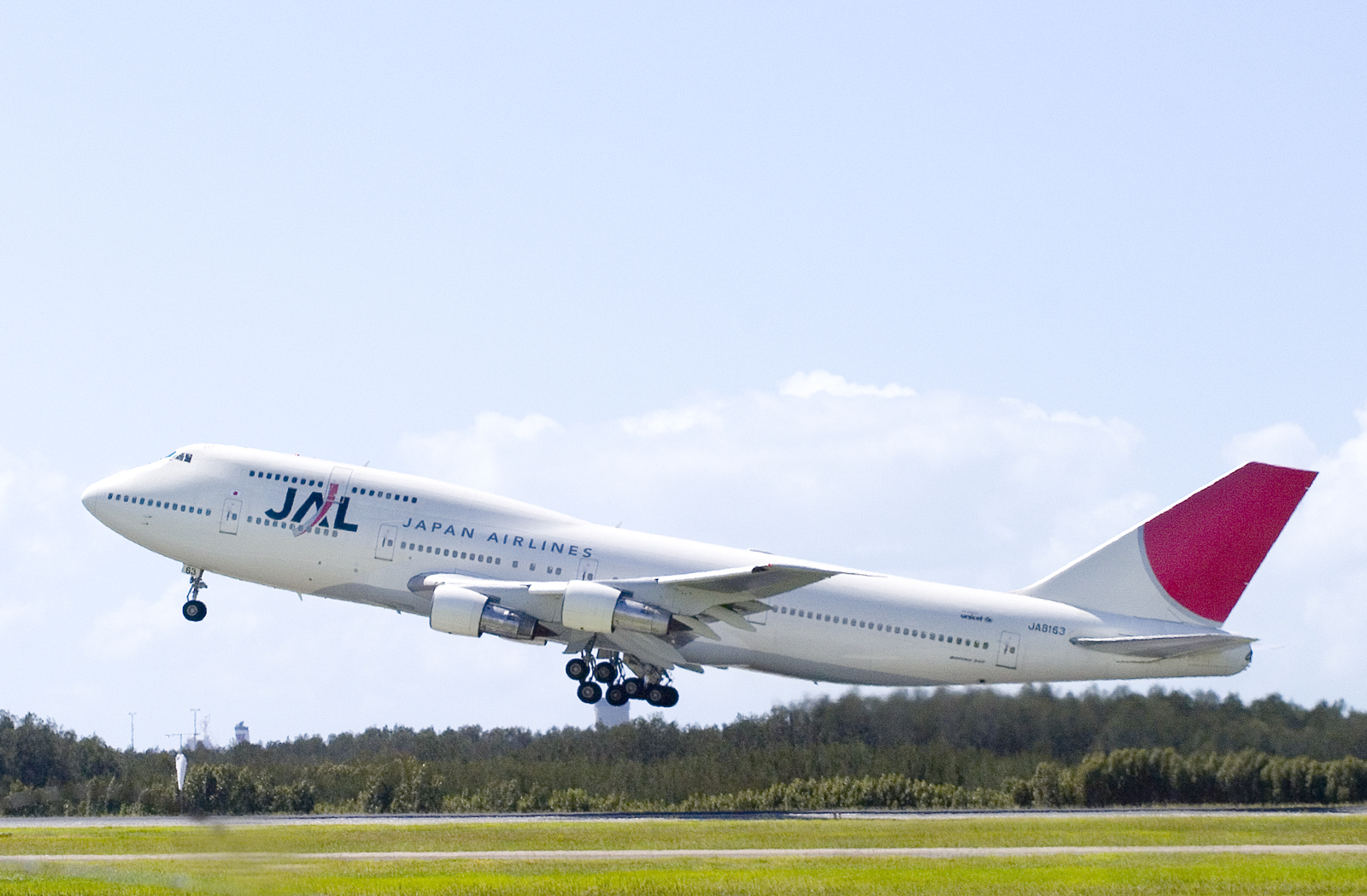
2002–2011

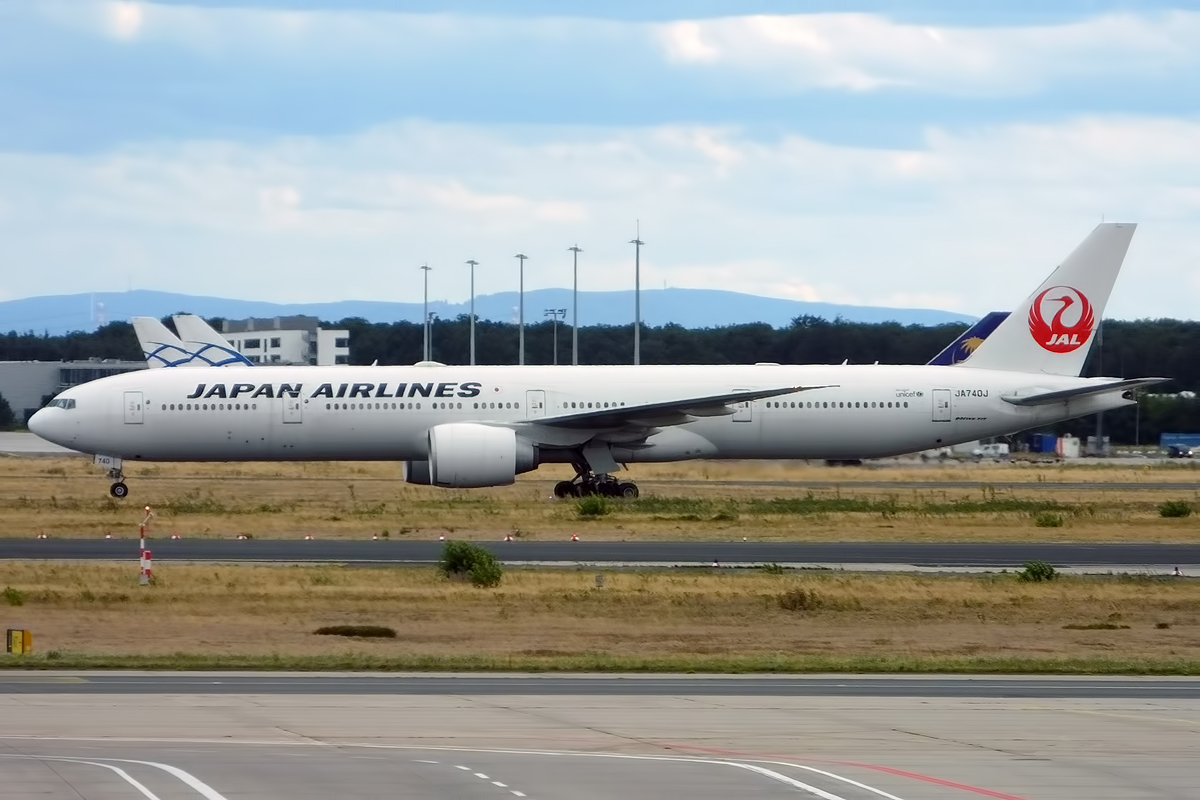
2011–present

== Destinations ==
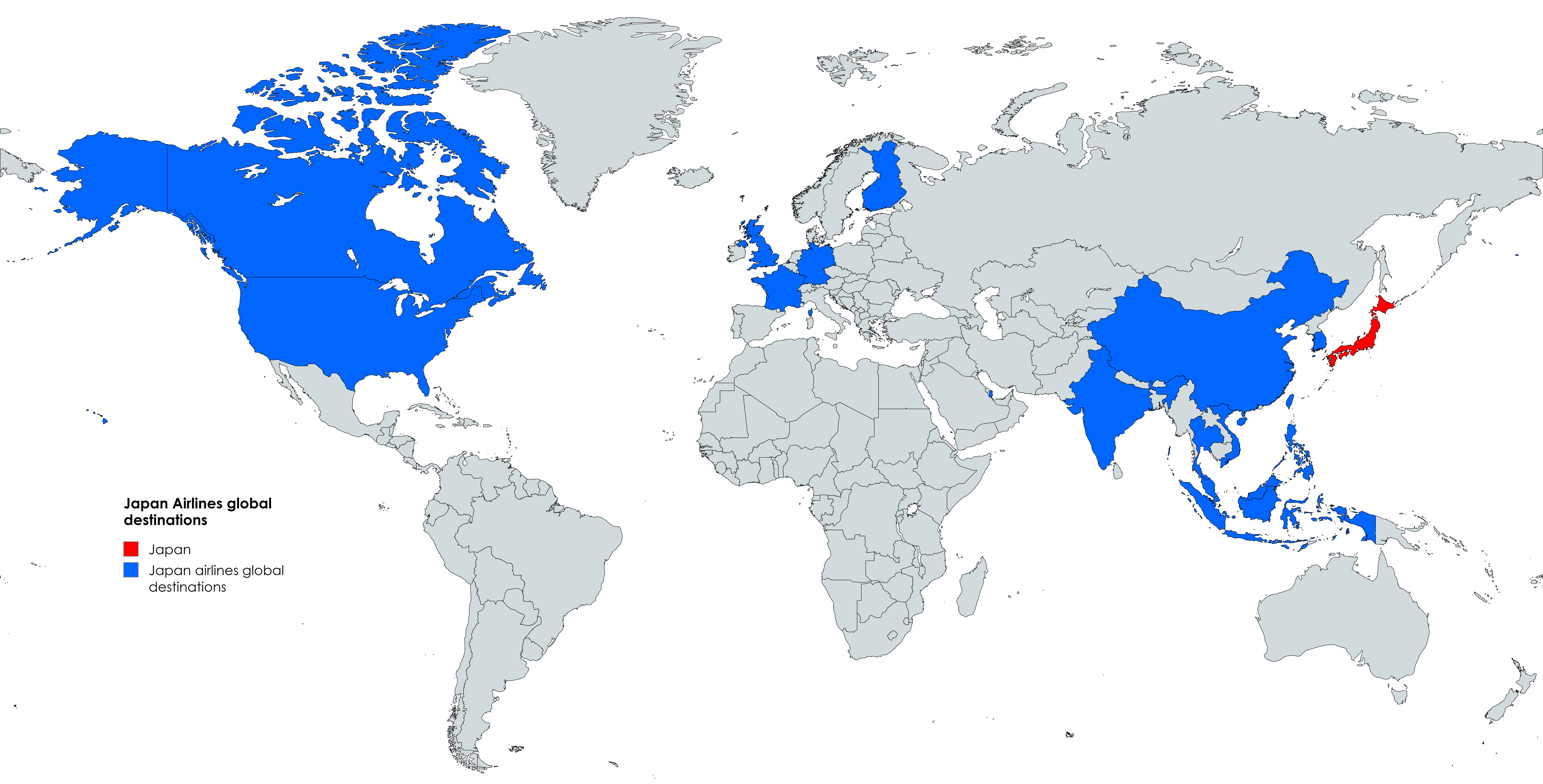
Japan Airlines destinations 2024.

Japan Airlines serves 60 domestic destinations and 39 international destinations in Asia, the Americas, Europe and Oceania, excluding codeshare agreements. The airline's international hubs are Tokyo's Narita International Airport and Haneda Airport, Osaka's Kansai International Airport and Itami Airport. Japan Airlines and its subsidiaries currently operate over 4,500 international flights and 26,000 domestic flights monthly.

In the fiscal year ended 31 March 2009, the airline introduced or increased services on ten international routes, including between Tokyo (Narita) and New York City, and between Osaka (Kansai) and Shanghai; and it ceased operations on four international routes, including between Tokyo (Narita) and Xi'an, and between Osaka (Kansai) and Qingdao. Domestically, JAL suspended 14 routes, including between Sapporo and Okinawa. Additionally, the airline expanded codesharing alliance with fellow Oneworld partners like American Airlines, British Airways, Cathay Pacific and Finnair, and other airlines, including Air France, China Eastern and Jetstar.

In the early years, Narita International Airport has been the main hub of international and freight flights, and that remains present. Nowadays, Haneda Airport is becoming a major international hub due to its close proximity to the Tokyo metropolis, and the heavy expansion occurring there.

=== Joint ventures ===
In addition to the above codeshares, Japan Airlines has entered into joint ventures with the following airlines:

- American Airlines
- British Airways
- Finnair
- Garuda Indonesia
- Iberia
- Malaysia Airlines

=== Codeshare agreements ===
Japan Airlines has codeshare agreements with the following airlines:

- Aeroméxico
- Air France
- Air Astana
- Air Tahiti Nui
- Aircalin
- Alaska Airlines
- Amakusa Airlines
- Bangkok Airways
- Cathay Pacific
- China Airlines
- China Eastern Airlines
- China Southern Airlines
- Emirates
- Fiji Airways
- Fuji Dream Airlines
- Hawaiian Airlines
- IndiGo
- Japan Transocean Air (Subsidiary)
- JetBlue
- Jetstar Japan (Subsidiary)
- Kalitta Air
- Korean Air
- LATAM Brasil
- LATAM Chile
- MIAT Mongolian Airlines
- Oriental Air Bridge
- Qantas
- Qatar Airways
- Royal Brunei Airlines
- Shanghai Airlines
- Spring Japan (Subsidiary)
- SriLankan Airlines
- VietJet Air
- WestJet
- XiamenAir

=== Interline agreements ===
- Myanmar National Airlines
- Nepal Airlines
- Singapore Airlines

== Fleet ==
Japan Airlines operates a fleet of wide-body and narrow-body aircraft manufactured by Airbus and Boeing. This does not include aircraft operated by JAL Group regional subsidiaries such as Hokkaido Air System, J-Air, Japan Air Commuter, Japan Transocean Air or Ryukyu Air Commuter.

== Services ==
=== Cabin classes ===
==== A350-1000 cabin ====
In January 2024, Japan Airlines debuted new First, Business, Premium Economy, and Economy class cabins on their A350-1000 fleet of aircraft. These cabins include enclosed suites, manufactured by Safran GB, and in-seat audio in the First and Business class cabins. The A350-1000 includes 6 First class seats in a 1-1-1 layout, 54 Business class seats in a 1-2-1 layout, 24 Premium Economy seats in a 2-4-2 layout, and 155 Economy seats in a 3-3-3 layout.

==== New cabin ====
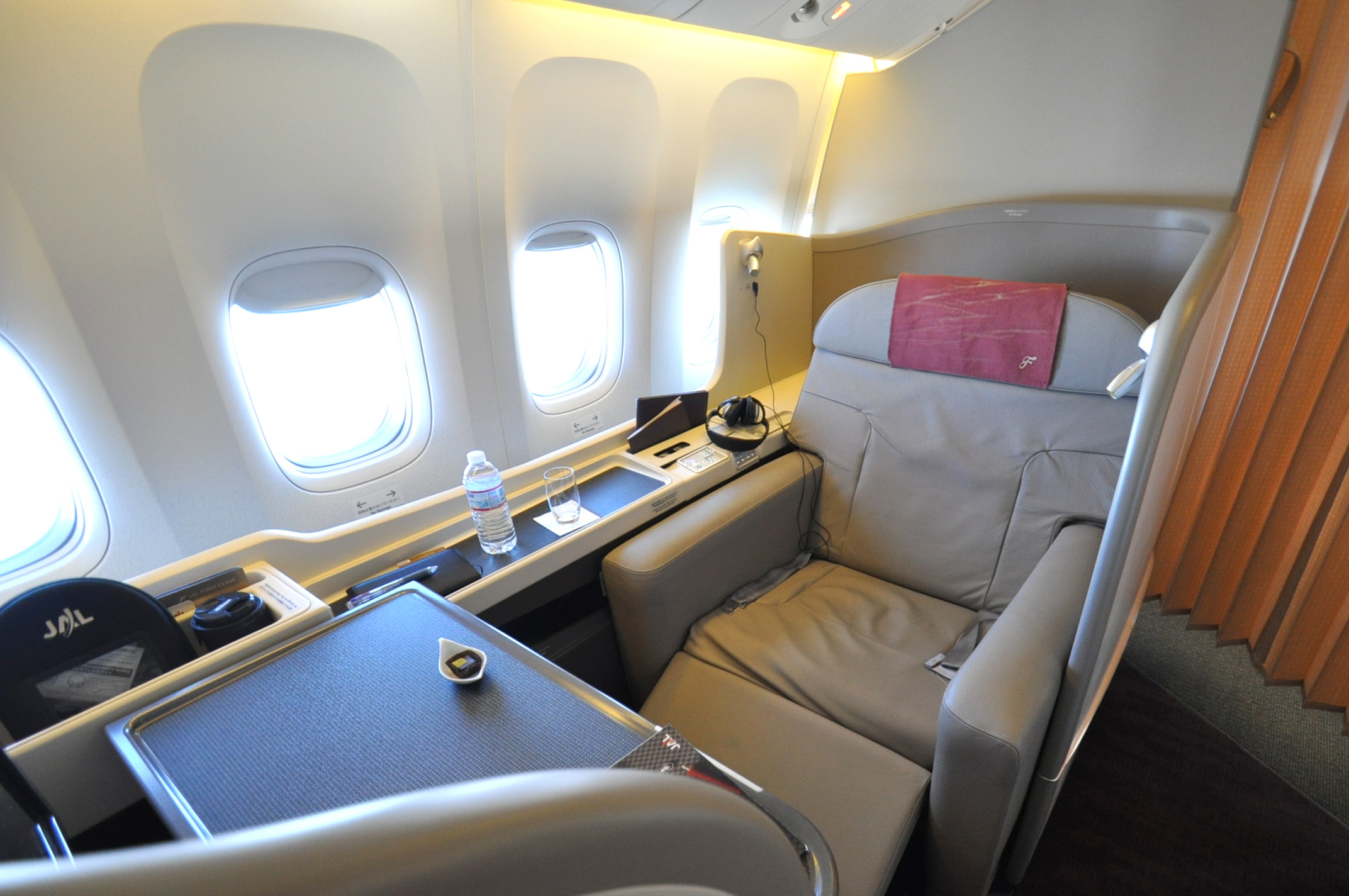
JAL First Class suite on a Boeing 777-300ER

JAL introduced new international First and Executive Class seats: the JAL Suite for First Class, featured a seat 20 percent roomier than the Skysleeper Solo in a 1-2-1 configuration; and the JAL Shell Flat Neo Seat for Executive Class Seasons, a slightly revised version of the original Shell Flat Seat, with a wider seat; expanded center console; and the world's first in-flight photo art exhibit, Sky Gallery. These seats, along with the Premium Economy seats, debuted on Japan Airlines Flights 5 and 6, operated on the Tokyo–New York route on 1 August 2008. It expanded to the Tokyo–San Francisco route on 13 September 2008, and the Tokyo–Chicago and Los Angeles in 2009. Between 2010 and 2017, the new cabin was also flown on flights from Narita to Jakarta, the only Asian destination for which the new cabin was used during that period.

In 2013, JAL debuted new versions of its economy and premium economy seats called Sky Premium and Sky Wider Economy respectively. The Sky Premium seats, found on selected 777-300s and soon 787s, feature the same width as the Sky Shell seats but with a 4" larger seat pitch of 42" and a 3" larger recline of up to 10" compared to a 38" pitch and 7" recline on the Sky Shell seats. The Sky Wider Economy seats, found on select 767s and select 777-300s, feature slimmer seats with 4" more legroom, and another inch of width totaling up to 35" of seat pitch, and a 19" width compared to the 31" pitch and 18" width of standard economy seats, plus a larger PTV screen of up to 11". The newer 787s will feature a new version of the Sky Wider seats called Sky Wider II, which will feature 5" more legroom and 2" more width totaling up to 36" of seat pitch and a 20" width in a less dense 2-4-2 setup instead of the 3-3-3 setup commonly used in a 787's economy cabin.

In premium cabins, JAL introduced fully lie-flat seats, branded as Sky Suite in Business Class cabin and enhanced First Suite seats in First Class cabin. The Sky Suite is in a staggered 2-3-2 setup that offer direct aisle access to all business class passengers. These can be found on all 13 of JAL's Boeing 777-300ER aircraft (named SS7), 10 of JAL's 787-8 aircraft (named SS8) and eight of JAL's 787-9 aircraft (named SS9). Later in 2015, JAL introduced a new version of Sky Suite, called Sky Suite II, in order to fit lie-flat seats on its new international 767-300ER fleet (named SS6), in a 1-2-1 setup. Since the seats are less wide than the original Sky Suite, SS6 aircraft are often seen on shorter international routes, like inter-Asian routes and Hawaiian routes. In 2016, as JAL was upgrading its Boeing 777-200ER fleet used on selected inter-Asian and Hawaiian flights, JAL introduced a third version of Sky Suite, called Sky Suite III, which is a lie-flat reverse-herringbone arranged seat. This seat is equipped on JAL's most Boeing 777-200ER fleet (named SS2) and five of JAL's Boeing 787-9 fleet (named SS9 II) in a 1-2-1 setup. Like SS6 aircraft, SS2 and SS9 II aircraft are operating on shorter international routes.

==== International services ====
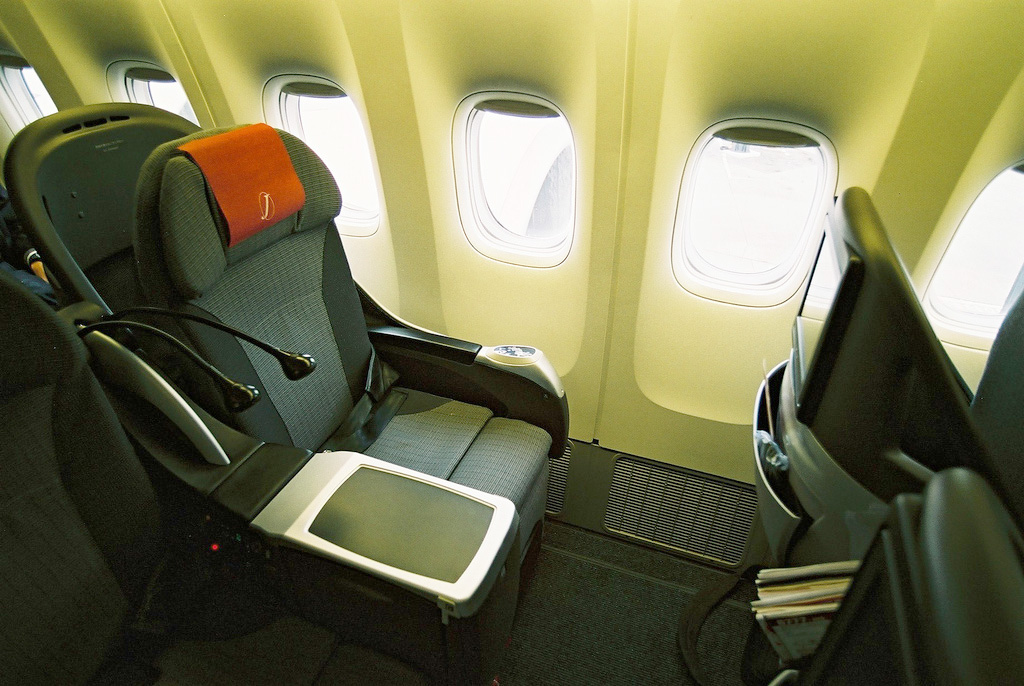
JAL Executive Class Seasons Shell Flat seat

The airline's international services with existing cabins feature the fully reclining JAL First Class JAL Suite; JAL Business Class JAL Sky Suite, JAL Sky Suite II, JAL Sky Suite III, JAL Shell Flat NEO, JAL Skyluxe Seat or JAL Skyrecliner; JAL Premium Economy JAL Sky Premium; and JAL Economy Class JAL Economy Class Seat or JAL Sky Wider. The First Class Skysleeper Solo reclines fully and features genuine leather upholstery from Poltrona Frau of Italy. The Executive Class Seasons Shell Flat Seat is a lie-flat design with the ability to lower armrests to the same height as the seat when reclined. It features a shell-shaped seat that allows passengers to recline by sliding their seat forward, without having the seat in front intrude when reclining.

==== Japan domestic services ====
On Japan domestic services, the airline offers First Class, Executive (Business) Class Class J and Economy Class. The First Class seat is made from premium genuine leather with a seat width of about 53 cm (21 in) and a seat pitch of about 130 cm (51 in). Class J features ergonomically designed reclining seats that promote relaxation by allowing passengers to move naturally and maintain a balanced posture.

=== In-flight entertainment ===
==== MAGIC ====
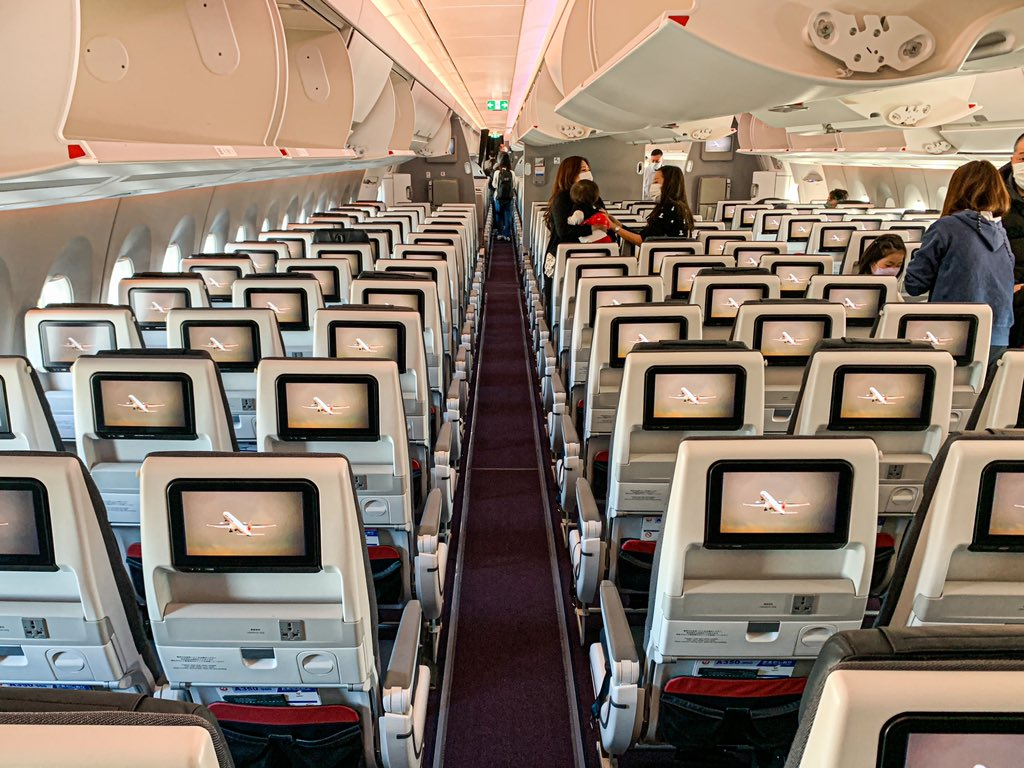
JAL Economy cabin on a Airbus A350-900 equipped with in-flight entertainment systems

MAGIC, JAL's in-flight entertainment system, supported by the JAL Mooove! (formerly Entertainment Network), features the latest hit movies and videos, games and audio programs. There are six generations of the MAGIC system: MAGIC-I, MAGIC-II, MAGIC-III, MAGIC-IV, MAGIC-V and the new MAGIC-VI. Introduced on 1 December 2007, the MAGIC-III system provides Audio/Video on Demand (AVOD) entertainment to all passengers. The number of movie, music, video and game channels on MAGIC-III was doubled from 57 to 130 by 2008; and it is installed on all seats on 767-300ER, 777-200ER and 777-300ER aircraft. Aircraft with MAGIC-I and MAGIC-II have movies that automatically start when the AVOD system is turned on—once the aircraft reaches cruise level—and economy class passengers can tune in to watch the movie in progress; and all movies restart upon completion. Executive and First Class passengers have full AVOD control. MAGIC systems also have JAL's duty-free shopping catalogue, including flight crew recommendations and a video of specials available on the flight. MAGIC-V will feature mostly the same entertainment as MAGIC-III, but with a touch screen controller, along with a handset. There will be USB ports for iPod connectivity, and an easier to control handset. (introduced on selected 767-300ER routes). The MAGIC-III system is used on internationally configured 767-300 with Skyluxe Seat, older internationally configured 767-300ER with Skyluxe Seat, all 777-200ER, older 777-300ER with Skysleeper Solo/Suite first class and Shell Flat Seat/Neo Business class. The MAGIC-IV is used on internationally configured 737-800s, along with a newer look of Skyluxe Seat. It uses 9-inch touchscreens by Panasonic SFX. The MAGIC-V system is deploying across the fleet, with selected 767-300ERs (Skyrecliner seat) and 787-8 (Shell Flat Neo seat) getting the IFE. Followed by refurbished 777-300ERs (all aircraft) and selected 767-300ER aircraft (including those with Skyluxe seat) will get the MAGIC-V along with new seats in all classes. The MAGIC-VI is installed on selected 787-8s and 777-300s.

==== Aircraft cameras ====
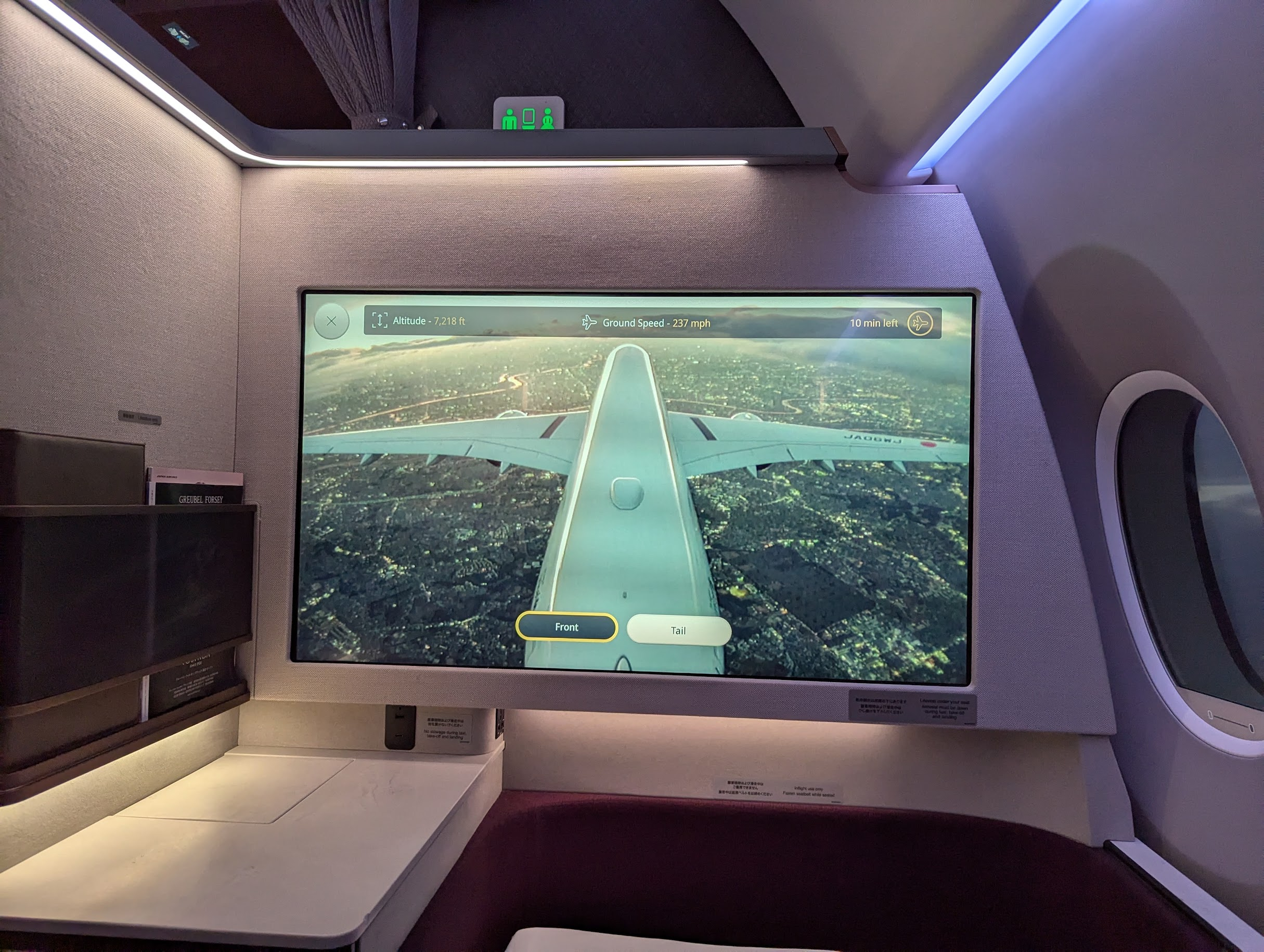
The in-flight tail camera on a JAL A350-1000, on final approach to Tokyo Haneda.

On most JAL international flights, on-plane cameras are available, either on the wings, the belly or on the tail. When the aircraft is in the pushback; taxi; take-off; ascent; descent; stacking; landing; and docking phases of flight, all TV's in the cabin automatically tune into the video camera outside the aircraft to provide "Pilot Vision" to the passengers. However, new entertainment systems do not have them anymore (except the airline's new A350, which does have cameras).

==== Additional media ====
Skyward, the airline group's inflight magazine, reflects the company motto of "Dream Skyward". Before the merger with JAS, JAL's inflight magazine was called Winds. All of the JAL Group magazines are provided by JALUX.

In a promotion, between 1 June and 31 August 2006, all Executive and First Class passengers would be offered the use of Nintendo DS Lites specially manufactured for air travel, with the wireless capabilities removed to conform with airline safety standards.

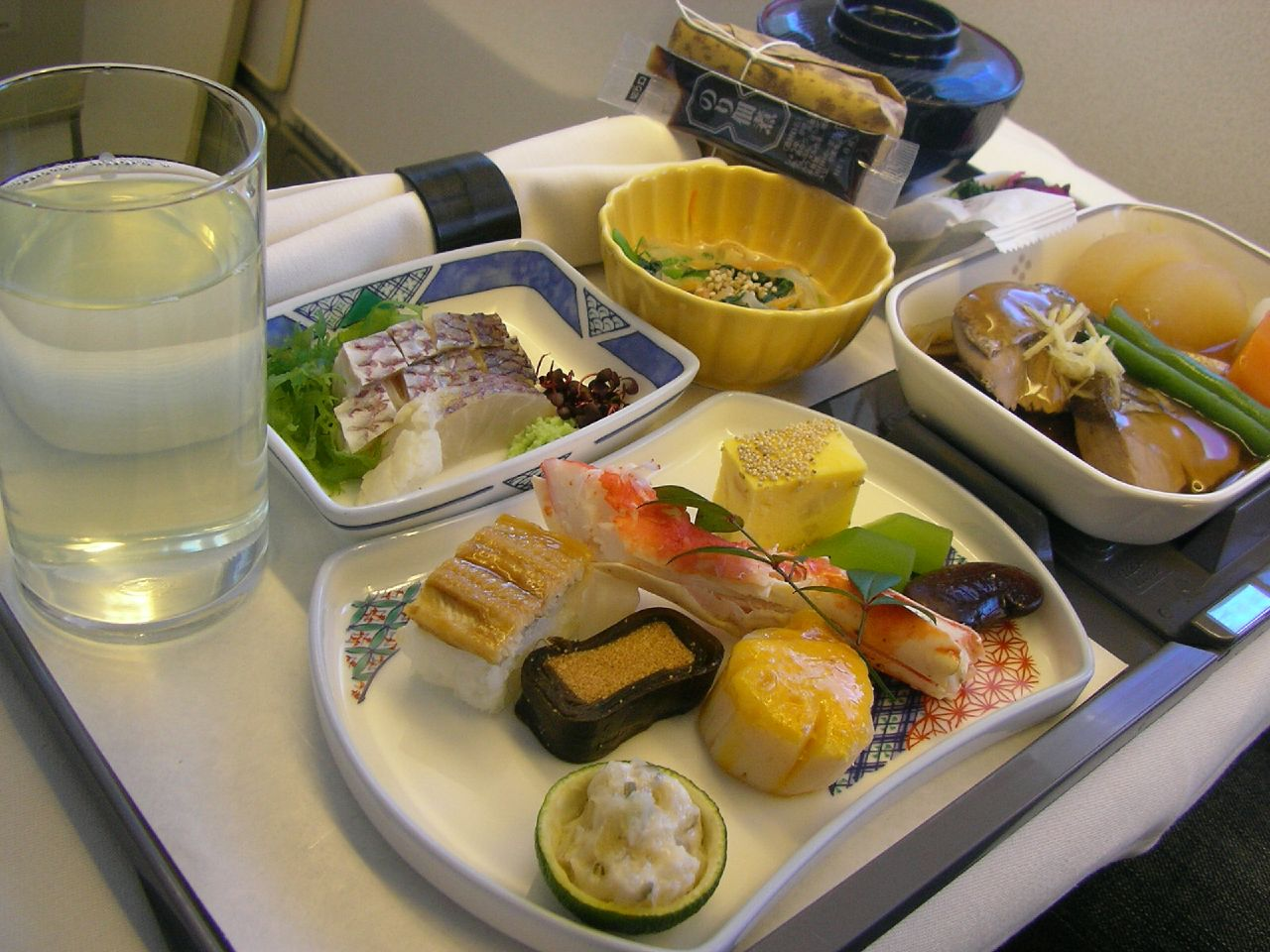
JAL Executive Class Seasons in-flight meal

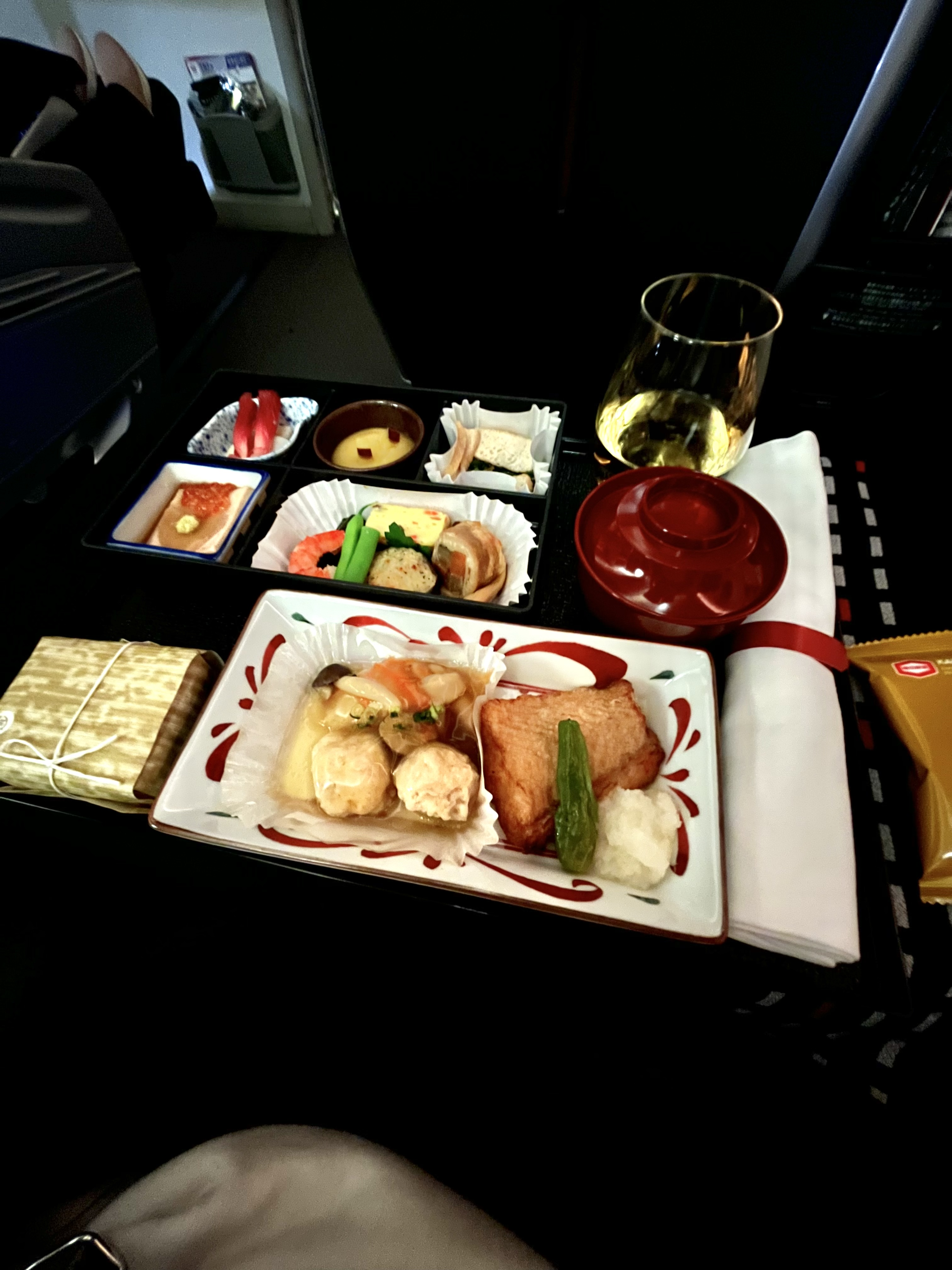
JAL Business Class food

After a trial run at Haneda airport, JAL announced it will offer selected passengers a VR experience using the Samsung Gear VR and the Samsung S8. Passengers will be able to experience specially curated programming in Germany, Argentina, the Nagoya fireworks and more programs at a later date.

=== In-flight catering ===
Japan Airlines offers meals on intercontinental routes, depending on the cabin class, destination and flight length. Western and Japanese menu selections are typically offered, including seasonal menu selections varied by destination. The airline has worked with high-profile chefs, including Fumiko Kono, Shinichi Sato, Koji Shimomura, Naoki Uchiyama, Chikara Yamada, Seiji Yamammoto and Hiroki Yoshitake in the creation of its menus and in 2016, launched a children's menu created by Kono, Yamada, Yamammoto, and Yosuke Suga.

=== Sakura Lounge ===
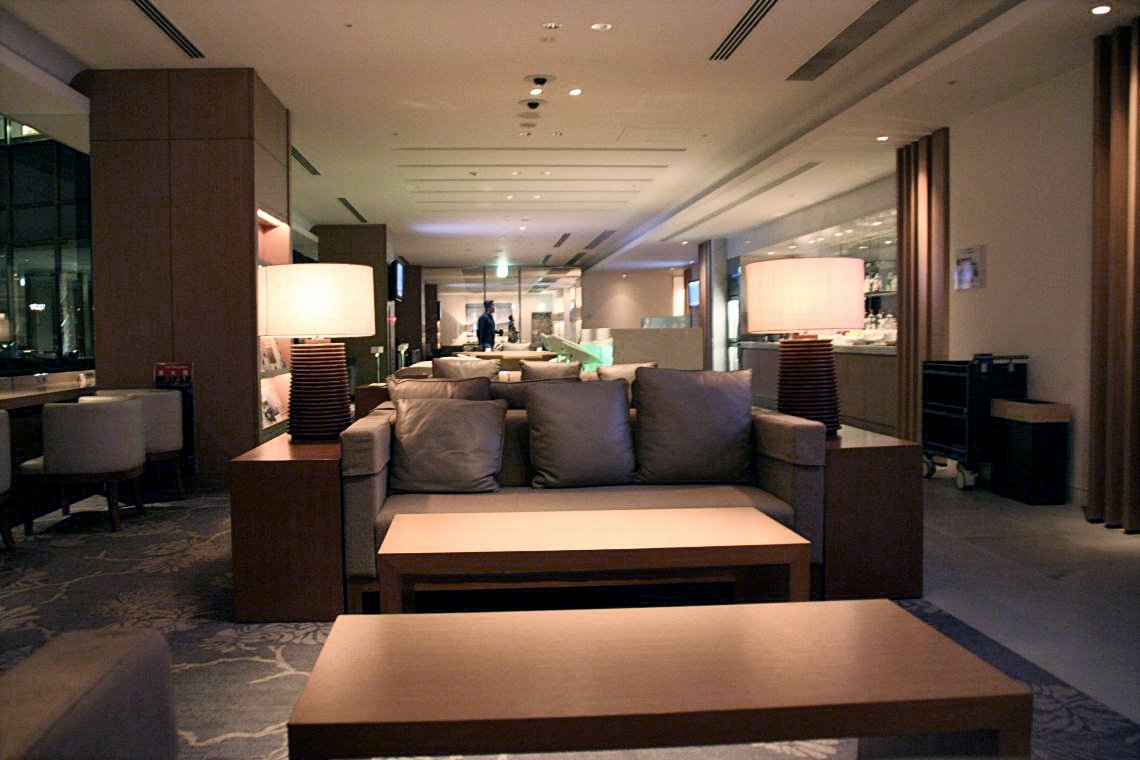
Sakura Lounge in Narita International Airport Terminal 2

Sakura Lounge, named after the Japanese word for cherry blossom, is Japan Airlines' signature lounge. In addition, the airline also operates the following international, including First Class Lounge, Sakura Lounge annex and JAL Lounge; and domestic lounges, including Diamond Premier Lounge and JAL Lounge. Access to the lounges depend on the class of travel or the membership status in the JAL Mileage Bank or JAL Global Club.

=== Former bus services ===
Circa the 1990s, JAL previously operated buses from Frankfurt Airport to Düsseldorf to serve customers in that German city, as well as buses from John F. Kennedy Airport in New York City to Fort Lee, New Jersey.

== Football sponsorship ==
In June 2024 Japan Airlines announced a multi-year partnership with Liverpool F.C., becoming the club's official airline partner. Japan Airlines is also an official sponsor of Shimizu S-Pulse and Consadole Sapporo.

== Award and recognition ==
On 24 June 2024, Japan Airlines was voted 2024 World's Best Premium Economy Class by Skytrax.

== In popular culture ==
Japan Airlines has been the focus of several television programmes in Japan over the years, mostly dramas revolving around cabin attendants.

- The shōjo manga Attention Please, by Chieko Hosokawa, followed the story of a young girl who joined JAL to be a cabin attendant while overcoming many difficulties. It was adapted into a TV drama by Tokyo Broadcasting System in 1970, which was remade in 2006. The remake stars Aya Ueto, who joins a class of cabin attendant nominees and later graduates. Most of the action of the story of the 2006 series takes place at JAL's Haneda flight operations headquarters. The series has had two specials made since the original, marking the main character's transition into JAL's international operations.
- During the 1980s, JAL was also the focus of another drama titled Stewardess Monogatari, which featured another young girl during training to be a JAL cabin attendant.
- During the 1990s, JAL featured several commercials starring celebrities, including Janet Jackson, who danced and sang to a backdrop of JAL 747s on rotation at LAX.
- In the social stimulation game Animal Crossing: New Horizons, Dodo Airlines is a parody of Japan Airlines.
- In the Tom Clancy novel Debt of Honor, a Japan Airlines pilot crashes its Boeing 747 into the United States Capitol.

== See also ==
- Air transport in Japan
- List of airports in Japan
- List of airlines of Japan
- Tokyu Corporation
- Japan Air System was a wholly owned subsidiary of Tokyu, and the company was merged into Japan Airlines. So, Tokyu had Japan Airlines' shares of 4 per cent until 2009. Now, Japan Airlines holds Tokyu's shares of 0.16 per cent because cooperates with Tokyu. Besides, Tokyu has held Japan Airlines's shares of 0.11 per cent because cooperates with Japan Airlines
