= Regional Economy Vitalization Corporation of Japan =

Japanese company

Regional Economy Vitalization Corporation of Japan (REVIC) (株式会社地域経済活性化支援機構, Kabushiki-gaisha Chiiki Keizai Kasseika Shien Kikō), is a special corporation established in 2013 under the Act on Regional Economic Revitalization Corporation of Japan. It is the successor to Enterprise Turnaround Initiative Corporation of Japan (ETIC). A public-private fund (government-affiliated financial institution and support organization), its aim is to comprehensively contribute to the revitalization of regional economies and provide business revitalization support to core regional companies.

In addition to the investment, financing, and rehabilitation support services for supported companies provided by ETIC, it also manages regional revitalization funds (Tourism Revitalization Fund, Regional Healthcare Industry Support Fund, Reconstruction Support Fund), provides growth support and human resources support, support for re-challenges, and GP/LP investment operations in funds as a way to attract private capital to promote the supply of risk money were added. The fund has been working with regional financial institutions to support the revitalization and creation of regional economies, and aims to further transfer its know-how from REVIC to establish an autonomous regional revitalization mechanism led by regional financial institutions.

In 2018, REVIC signed a comprehensive collaboration agreement with the Agency for Cultural Affairs to collaborate and cooperate in the establishment of a model for regional economic revitalization utilizing cultural assets in order to ensure the sustainable maintenance and development of Japan's cultural assets and the regions that nurtured them. The front office will mainly consist of people from private financial institutions, consulting firms, and professional firms such as accountants and lawyers, while the middle and back offices will be operated by a mixed public-private professional organization. Supervisory authorities are the Cabinet Office, the Financial Services Agency, the Ministry of Internal Affairs and Communications, the Ministry of Finance, and the Ministry of Economy, Trade and Industry.

Its predecessor, the Enterprise Turnaround Initiative Corporation of Japan (ETIC-J) (企業再生支援機構, Kigyō Saisei Shien Kikō), was a Japanese incorporated company established in 2009 under the "Enterprise Turnaround Initiative Corporation Law", with 50 percent of its shares (10,000,000,000 yen) owned by the Japanese government and the rest by about 130 private enterprises. ETIC-J supported the turnaround of small and medium-sized corporations that had found themselves in difficulties, in spite of possessing useful management capabilities. It continued the role of the Industrial Revitalization Corporation of Japan (Japanese: 産業再生機構), or IRC-J, which existed from 2003 to 2007, under the same law.

== Companies that were supported by ETIC-J ==
- Small and medium-sized companies
- Japan Airlines (2009–2012)
- Willcom (2010)

== See also ==
- Chapter 11 (US)
- Insolvency (UK)
