= Mitsuko Tottori =

Japanese airline executive (born 1964)

- 鳥取三津子
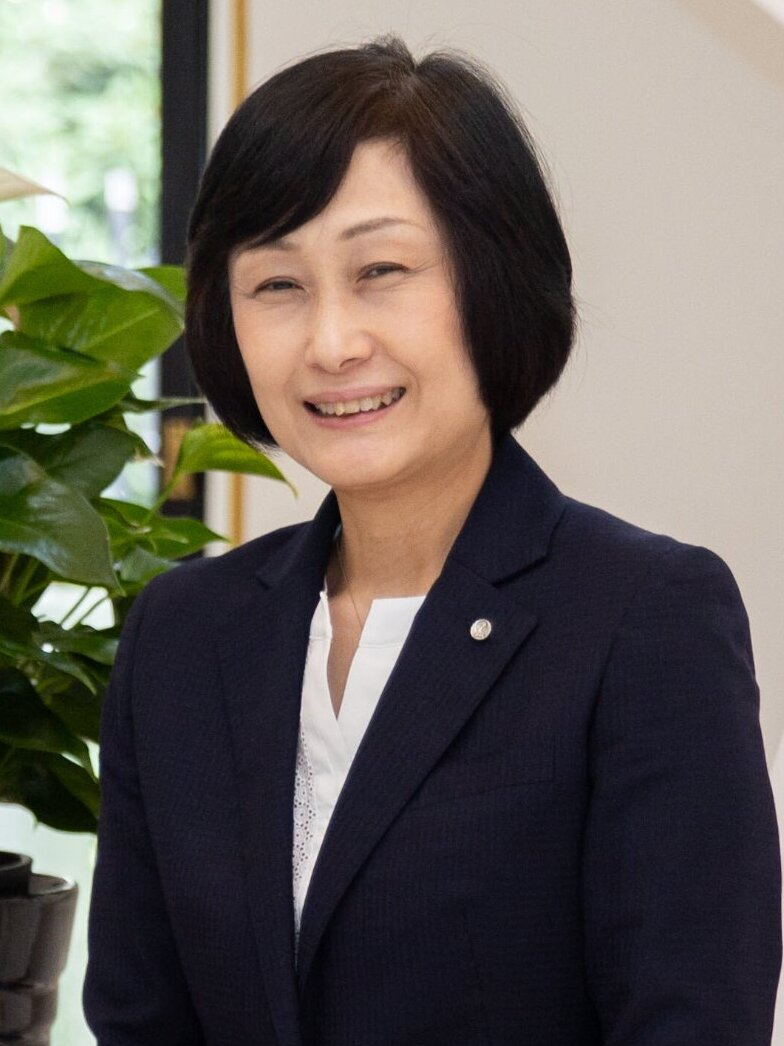
- Tottori in 2024
- Born: 31 December 1964 (age 61)
- Education: Kwassui Women's Junior College
- Occupations: Businessperson, airline executive, flight attendant, chief executive officer
- Employer: Japan Airlines

Mitsuko Tottori (鳥取 三津子, Tottori Mitsuko; born 31 December 1964) is a Japanese airline executive.

She was named representative director, President and Chief Executive Officer of Japan Airlines (JAL) in April 2024, becoming the first woman to lead the company.

Tottori began her career as a flight attendant. She joined Toa Domestic Airlines (TDA) in 1985 after graduating from Kwassui Women's Junior College. TDA (later JAS) was merged with JAL in 2001. "Her leadership style is often described as calm, methodical, and people-focused, with a strong emphasis on safety, discipline, and corporate responsibility."

She was ranked number 5 on the 2024 Fortune Most Powerful Women Asia list, and number 10 on the same list in 2025. Her estimated salary in 2026 is ¥240 million per year.
