= Kōgorō Uemura =

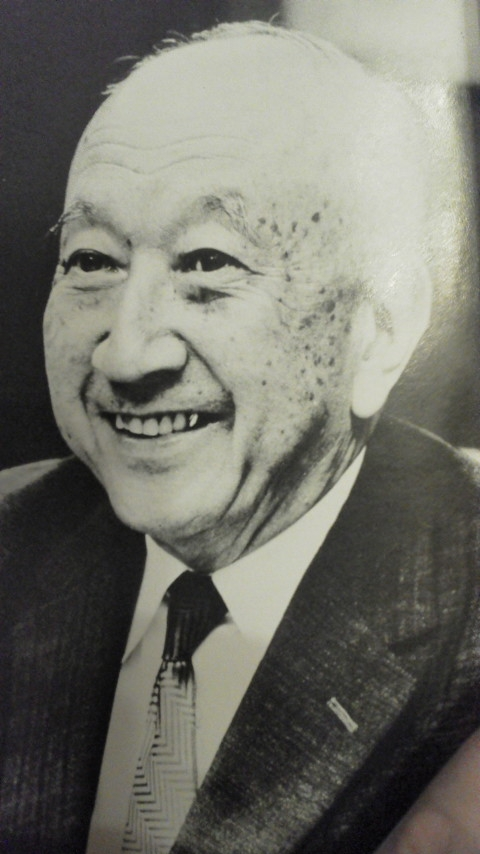
- Born: February 12, 1894
- Died: August 1, 1978 (aged 84)
- Occupation: Businessman
- Known for: Chief of Nippon Keidanren

Kōgorō Uemura (植村 甲午郎, Uemura Kōgorō; February 12, 1894 – August 1, 1978) was a Japanese businessman from the early Shōwa period (1920s–1970s). The chief of Nippon Keidanren in 1968, he served as President of the Sapporo Olympic Organizing Committee, and served as Chairman of the National Board of the Boy Scouts of Japan.

== Background ==
Uemura was a graduate of Tokyo's Hibiya High School.

In 1978 he received the highest distinction of the Scout Association of Japan, the Golden Pheasant Award.
