= NAMC YS-11 =

Turboprop airliner produced by NAMC (Nihon Aircraft Manufacturing Corporation)

YS-11
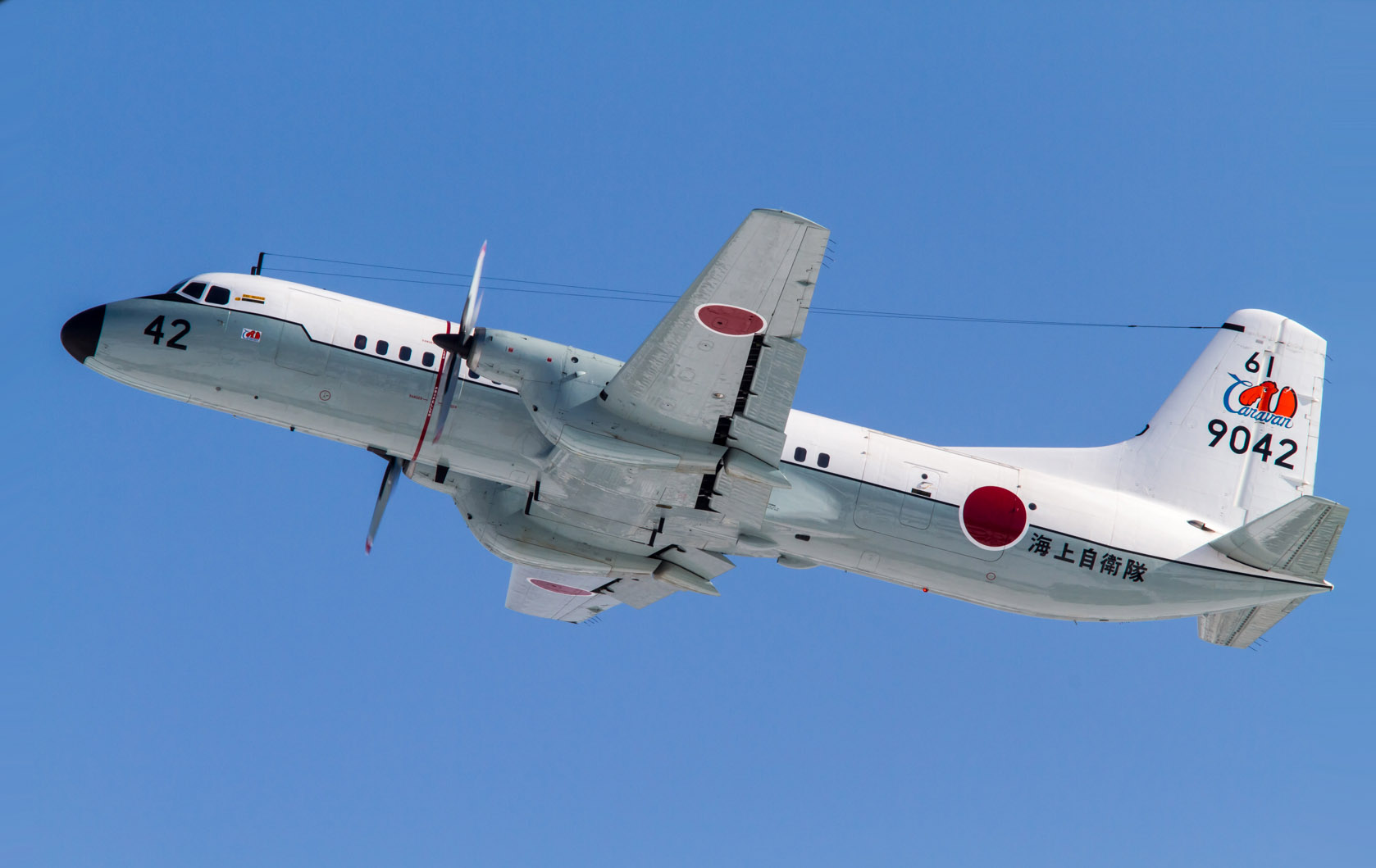
- A Japan Maritime Self-Defense Force YS-11M in 2013

General information
- Type: Turboprop airliner
- National origin: Japan
- Manufacturer: Nihon Aircraft Manufacturing Corporation
- Status: Three in service with the Japan Air Self-Defense Force (as of 30 June 2024)
- Number built: 182

History
- Manufactured: 1962–1974
- Introduction date: 30 March 1965, for All Nippon Airways (first passenger flight with Japan Air Commuter in 1965)
- First flight: 30 August 1962

The NAMC YS-11 is a turboprop airliner designed and built by the Nihon Aircraft Manufacturing Corporation (NAMC), a Japanese consortium. It was the only post-war airliner to be wholly designed and manufactured in Japan until the development of the ultimately cancelled Mitsubishi SpaceJet during the 2010s, roughly 50 years later.

Development of the YS-11 can be largely attributed to Japan's Ministry of International Trade and Industry (MITI), which had encouraged Japanese aircraft companies to collaborate on the development of a short-haul airliner as early as 1954. In 1959, NAMC was formed to design and produce an aircraft to satisfy MITI's requirements, dubbed the YS-11. On 30 August 1962, the first prototype performed its maiden flight. Deliveries commenced on 30 March 1965, and commercial operations began the following month. The majority of orders for the type were issued from various Japanese airlines. While sales to such customers were swift in the YS-11's initial years of availability, this limited market soon became saturated, leading to a slump in demand.

Production of the type came to an end in 1974 as a result of efforts to increase sales to international clients, including the creation of the better YS-11A variation. In the end, the YS-11 had shown that Japan was capable of building an airliner, but NAMC had racked up a huge debt, and the type is generally regarded as a commercial failure. Large numbers of the type continued to be in service until 2006, at which point tighter Japanese aircraft regulations imposed by the Ministry of Land, Infrastructure, Transport and Tourism necessitated either the withdrawal or refitting of all YS-11s. By 2018, only a single example reportedly remained in commercial service.

== Development and design ==
=== Origins ===
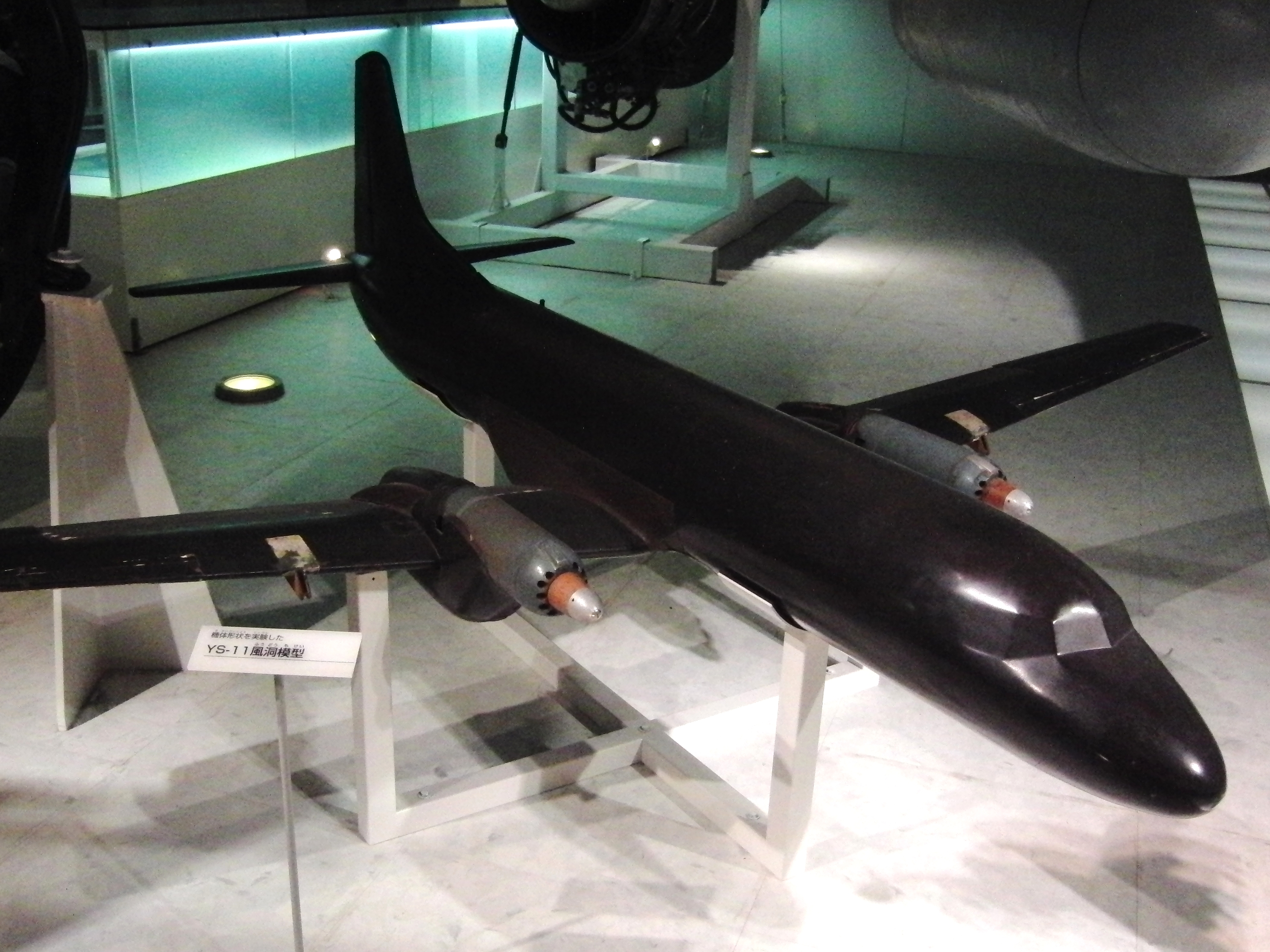
A wind tunnel model of the YS-11

During the mid-to-late 1950s, the Japanese Ministry of International Trade and Industry (MITI) identified a requirement for a short-haul airliner to replace Douglas DC-3s flying on Japan's domestic routes, and encouraged companies in Japan's aircraft industry to collaborate to develop and produce a domestic airliner to meet this need. Towards this purpose, in May 1957, the Commercial Transport Design Research Association was established and the availability of government subsidies guaranteed. From the government's viewpoint, the development of such an airliner was viewed as a key initiative towards the post-war revival of the nation's aircraft companies, which came in addition to the serious ambition to become a major international competitor in the global airliner business. Furthermore, while this requirement had been conceived primarily in a commercial context, there was an early recognition of the value for multiple branches of the Japanese Defense Agency (JDA) to be readily able to adopt the type as well; as a philosophy, this not only extended to the prospective airliner itself, but the various technologies involved in its development and manufacture.

In response to this encouragement, during 1957, a joint venture between Mitsubishi Heavy Industries, Kawasaki Heavy Industries, Fuji Heavy Industries, Shin Meiwa, Showa Aircraft Industry Company and Japan Aircraft Industry Company was established for the purpose of developing and manufacturing the envisioned airliner. Two years later, this partnership was formalised as the Nihon Aeroplane Manufacturing Company (NAMC). The ownership of NAMC was initially divided between the Japanese government, which held 54% of the shares, while the constituent aircraft manufacturers held an 18% stake and several components/materials suppliers owned 11%; the remaining shares were small stakes belonging to various banks, insurance companies, and stock firms who chose to invest in the programme. However, NAMC was essentially a "paper company", being reliant upon both personnel and infrastructure provided by its constituent manufacturers.

NAMC designed a low-winged twin-turboprop-engined monoplane, capable of seating up to 60 passengers, dubbed the YS-11. Amongst the design team was Jiro Horikoshi, who had previously been the designer of the famed wartime Mitsubishi A6M Zero fighter. Another prominent engineer on the project was Teruo Tojo, the second son of Prime Minister Hideki Tojo, who later became chairman of Mitsubishi Motors. The twin-engined YS-11 was projected as delivering similar operational performance to the four-engined British-built Vickers Viscount, while possessing 50% greater capacity than the similarly configured Dutch-built Fokker F27 Friendship. MITI supervised the pricing of the aircraft in order to ensure that it was competitive with the American-built Martin 4-0-4.

Although the tentative aircraft was mainly designed and manufactured in Japan, the engine selected to power the airliner was the 2,275 kW (3,050 ehp) Rolls-Royce Dart RDa.10/1 powerplant, which was both developed and produced by British-based company Rolls-Royce. Furthermore, according to author Stephen C Mercado, due to the lack of available domestic technology at the time, several of the key aircraft systems, such as cabin pressurization, were copied from foreign sources; such information was gleaned from a combination of Japanese airlines, trading companies and diplomats. Throughout the YS-11's production lifetime, its electronic equipment, avionics, mechanical and fuselage components were supplied by a combination of Japanese companies and foreign suppliers.

=== Name ===
The “YS” of the YS-11 comes from a combination of the first letter sounds of the two Japanese words yusō (transport) and sekkei (design), which refer to the Association for Research on Transport Aircraft Design (Yusōki sekkei kenkyū kyōkai). Meanwhile, the first “1” of the “11” refers to the various engine candidates considered for the YS-11; the Rolls-Royce Dart RDa.10/1, which was the engine selected, had been designated “number 1.” The second “1” refers to the aircraft specification plan selected for the YS-11, which had been one among many plans that differed by wing placement and size. There had also been a “plan 0” at one point.

A catchphrase developed around the public reveal of the YS-11 mockup, which was “Let’s meet on the 11th at Sugita in Yokohama.” Here, Yokohama represented the “Y,” the Sugita neighborhood stood for the “S,” and the 11th referred both to the plane and to the date of the public reveal (December 11, 1958). Because of this, it became common to read the “11” in “YS-11” as “eleven” (jūichi in Japanese). For those involved in designing the plane, meanwhile, the designation had originally been pronounced “YS-one-one” (or YS ichi ichi).

=== Into flight ===
On 30 August 1962, the first prototype performed its maiden flight from Nagoya Airport; it was soon followed by the second prototype, flying on 28 December 1962. Early flight testing revealed several issues to troubleshoot, including poor steering, excessive vibration and noise. There was also an acute lack of safety during sideways maneuvers; the wake of the propeller produced abnormal forces that inclined the aircraft to the right; all of the rudders were ineffective; and the maneuverability was worst of all. These problems produced a tailspin during the flight test, and were the direct cause of a crash. This was known as the “three rudder problem.”

In one prestigious early flight of the type, All Nippon Airways used a YS-11 to carry the Olympic torch in the run-up to the 1964 Summer Olympics in Tokyo. It received its Japanese Type certificate on 25 August 1964, while American Federal Aviation Administration (FAA) certification followed on 9 September 1965. Prior to applying for certification, the FAA had been involved in the programme at NAMC's invitation, performing informal project reviews so that defects could be identified and eliminated early on.

During the late 1960s, a lack of significant international sales led to the programme incurring persistent losses, the outstanding debt eventually growing to $600 million. Due to the organisation of the programme, the aircraft manufacturers themselves did not have any of this debt apportioned to themselves, NAMC being held solely responsible; Mercado criticised this approach as it meant there was no incentive for the individual companies to make cost savings while simultaneously guarantee profit to them on every plane produced. Furthermore, it had been alleged that some participants saw the YS-11 as only a training programme to develop their employees' skills, rather than a serious commercial initiative; some participants chose to rotate large numbers of staff in and out of the project for brief periods before re-tasking them to work on internal projects.

Mercado claims that the programme's operational mindset was closer to that of a military project than a commercial one, while a preoccupation with government-issued performance criteria obstructed considerations towards the actual desires of the commercial operators, such as operating costs and cabin configuration, that the YS-11 was marketed towards. As this was Japan's first, and for a long time only, post-war airliner, NAMC lacked any staff with experience in marketing towards airlines, a disadvantage against the salesmen of rival airframers. This failure to address a crucial factor in acquiring new customers has been attributed as a major contributing cause of the programme's poor commercial reception.

The end of the YS-11 programme was precipitated by the 1971 Smithsonian Agreement, which led to an appreciation in the value of the Japanese yen and the resulting impact upon the nation's economy. By this point, it was clear that there was little chance that the YS-11 could ever come close to breaking even. These myriad factors contributed to the decision for production to be terminated after the completion of 182 aircraft. On 11 May 1973, the last YS-11 was delivered to the Japanese Maritime Self-Defence Force (JMSDF).

== Operational history ==
On 23 October 1964, the first production YS-11 conducted its first flight; it was delivered to its customer on 30 March 1965. During April 1965, initial airline operations commenced with launch customer Toa Airways. By 1968, the YS-11 programme accounted for about half of all aircraft production taking place in Japan that year. Early deliveries were mainly made to Japanese airlines, but orders for the type slowed drastically after the satisfaction of the outstanding needs of the Japanese commuter airlines for which the aircraft had been designed. Initial attempts were made to market the airliner towards various countries across Southeast Asia; at one point, the Japanese government was allegedly encouraging such sales as a form of war reparations.

Seeking to make the aircraft more attractive to the highly active North American market, NAMC decided to develop the YS-11A, a new variant which possessed a higher gross weight. During 1966, a lease agreement was signed between NAMC and Hawaiian Air Lines, a move which was hailed as the "first step" in the programme's new America-focused campaign. While a number of aircraft would be sold internationally, these were often at a loss as the sales price had been set so low, deliberately as to undercut competing airliners, but paid little heed to production costs; this deficit led to losses mounting more rapidly than anticipated.

A major customer for the YS-11 was the American operator Piedmont Airlines, who had been seeking the optimal modern airliner to serve their existing routes, which mostly comprised a number of small, mountainous airports. After evaluating numerous aircraft around the world, the company determined that the Japanese airliner was the most suitable; according to Piedmont's president, Thomas H Davis: "The YS‐11 was the only one we could find which would do it on an economical basis". During October 1967, Piedmont Airlines ordered a batch of ten YS-11A-200s along with an option for an additional ten aircraft for $22.5 million. The company was so impressed by its performance, it both exercised the option for ten aircraft and purchased an additional YS-11, operating a combined fleet of 21 YS-11s by mid-1970. Piedmont would be the type's largest international operator; ultimately, no other airline would place another order of this scale.

=== End of production ===
Commercial sales of the YS-11 began to stall without a stable structure in place for sales. Especially outside of Japan, the YS-11 was forced to compete with other countries' models with long-term low deferred interest payments. Nor was it rare for NAMC to have to sell the YS-11 at a discount, as this was Japan's first commercial airliner since the end of World War II, and had no track record. Additionally, it was also said that the program's cost management was mismanaged, as initial estimates had neglected to include the cost of advertising or company administration. Moreover, because multiple companies were involved with the aircraft manufacturing, it was unclear who held ultimate responsibility, nor could the price of delivered parts be reduced. An increase in former government employees appointed to the company began to spread a culture of bureaucracy, making necessary drastic management reforms impossible and further increasing the program's deficit.

In particular, there was a sales deficit outside of Japan that was a result of fundamental problems in NAMC's administrative activities in the United States, as indicated by the Japanese government Board of Audit; this is to say nothing of the unforeseen loss due to less-favorable currency exchange after the American government switched to a floating exchange rate in 1971. When Jenks Caldwell of Charlotte Aircraft Corporation, a sales dealer of used aircraft and aviation parts headquartered in North Carolina, expressed a strong desire to become a sales agent in the United States through a modification of YS-11A, NAMC signed an exclusive agency contract with his company to manage sales for North America, Latin America and Spain. However, Charlotte Aircraft did not actually carry out the promised activities, and when a sales agreement with Piedmont Airlines was concluded with Mitsui, Charlotte Aircraft demanded damages under its status as exclusive dealer. When Piedmont and Cruzeiro do Sul handed over 33 used aircraft traded in for YS-11s to Charlotte Aircraft, Japan's Board of Audit complained these actions were unfair. This event became a problem in the Diet, and the managing director of NAMC resigned. NAMC had no experience selling passenger planes, and so it concluded a contract with Charlotte Aircraft without conducting an investigation into the company's trustworthiness or business practices, nor without creating a clause in the event Charlotte Aircraft refused to conduct sales. When the contract with Charlotte Aircraft was terminated, NAMC was forced to pay 23,000,000 yen and turn over used aircraft.

In addition, any requests for a reduction in sales price or delayed payments by airlines had to be reviewed by governmental organizations like the Ministry of Finance or the Ministry of International Trade and Industry. It was said that there were many instances of contracts that could not be concluded due to the absence of the various ministry's approval.

By 1994, 112 YS-11s remained in service; the lengthy service life of the type, despite the short manufacturing lifespan, has been hailed by some officials as evidence of the type being successful in some respect. The YS-11 was slowly phased out by Japanese airlines up until the early 2000s, at which point the withdrawal rate spiked in response to new directives issued by the Ministry of Land, Infrastructure, Transport and Tourism that required all commercial aircraft in Japan to be fitted with a Traffic Collision Avoidance System (TCAS); any aircraft lacking TCAS were forced to cease operations at the end of 2006. Reportedly, equipping a YS-11 with TCAS had been estimated as costing around ¥100 million (about US$1 million), such a refit was deemed economically unsound. Those aircraft that remained in a flight-worthy condition were typically sold to foreign companies. On 30 September 2006, Japan Air Commuter Flight 3806 marked the final flight of a YS-11 within Japan's commercial aviation industry.

In 2007, the YS-11 was added to the Mechanical Engineering Heritage of Japan as item number 13. As of 2014, fifteen were operated by the Japanese military, and two in Mexico. As of 2017, only eight remained in service with the Japan Air Self-Defense Force, which were being used for flight checks and other ancillary purposes. As of August 2020, two aircraft remain in commercial service in South America and Africa. As of March 2021, the Japan Air Self-Defense Force retired the YS-11 after 57 years of service.

== Variants ==
YS-11
YS-11-100
Initial production variant. 23,500 kg (51,810 lb) gross weight. 48 built.
YS-11A-200
Increased gross weight (24,500 kg (54,010 lb) passenger airliner.
YS-11A-300
Combi version of YS-11-200, fitted with large cargo door and capable of carrying both passengers and freight.
YS-11A-400
Pure cargo version of -200, used only by Japanese defence forces.
YS-11A-500
Passenger airliner with further increased (25,000 kg (55,110 lb)) gross weight produced from 1970.
YS-11A-600
Combi version of -500.
YS-11E
JASDF "Super YS" powered by T64-IHI-10J.

== Operators ==
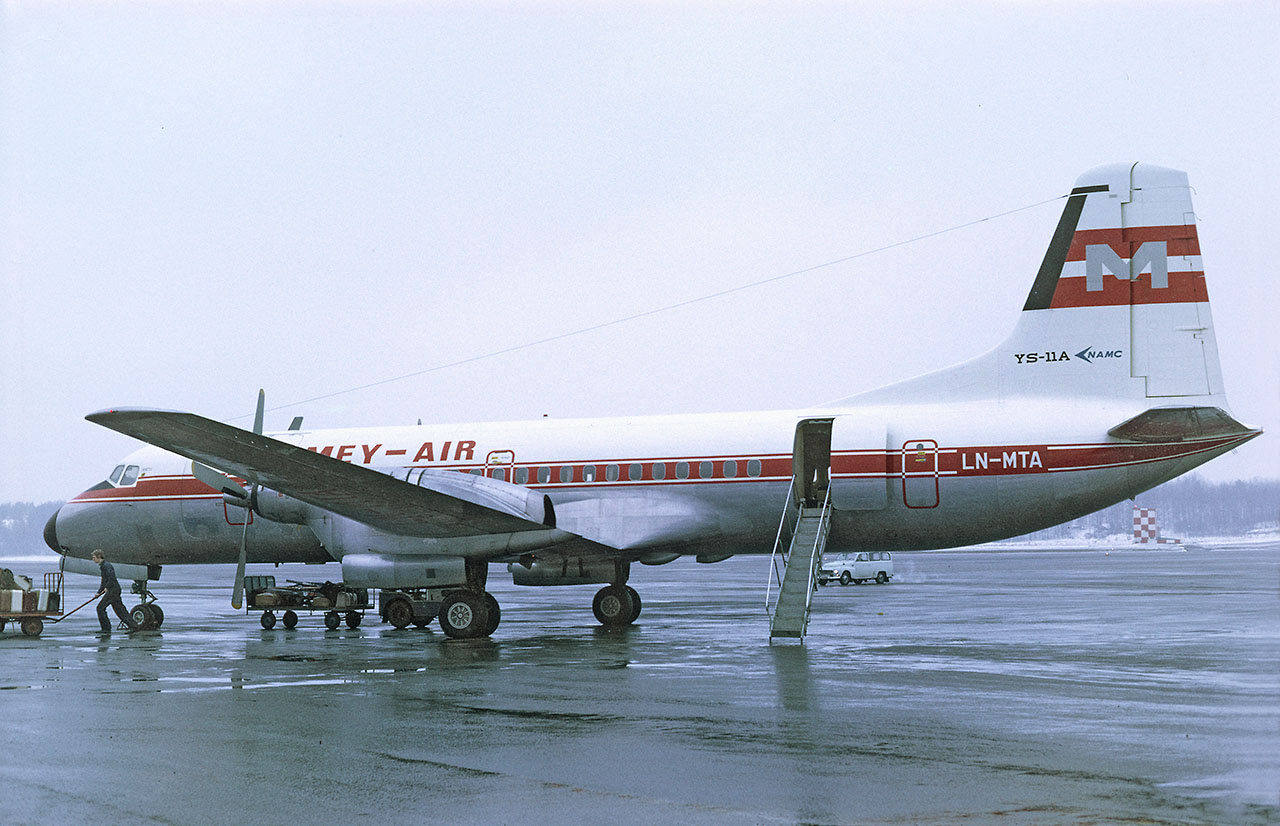
Mey-Air YS-11 in 1971

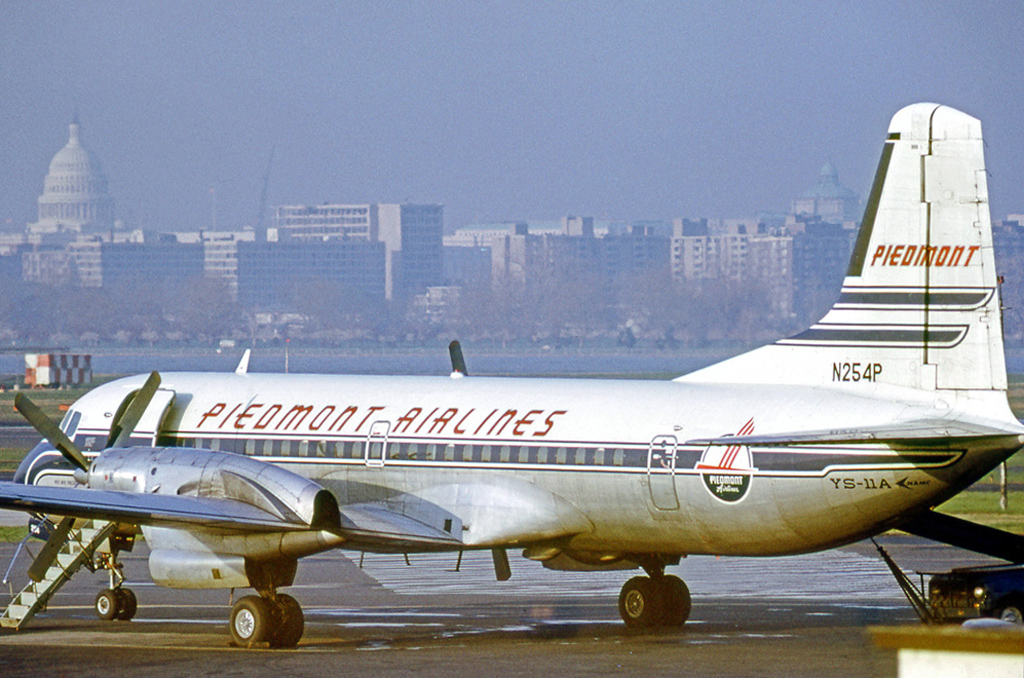
Piedmont Airlines YS-11A at Ronald Reagan Washington National Airport in Crystal City, Virginia, with the United States Capitol in the background in 1972

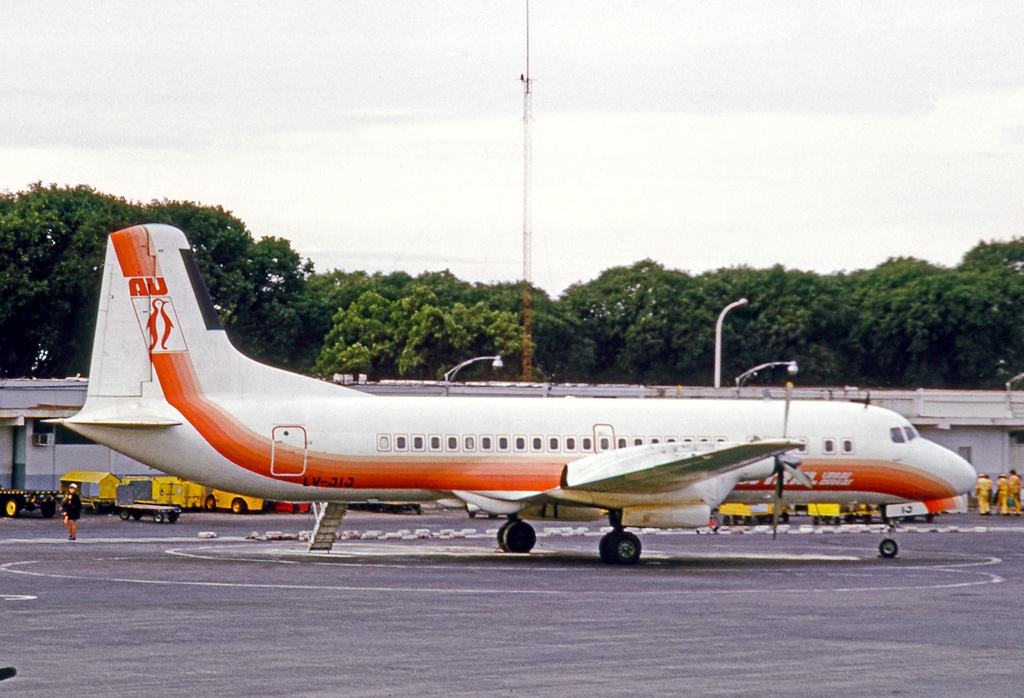
NAMC YS-11A of Austral Líneas Aéreas at Aeroparque Jorge Newbery in 1972

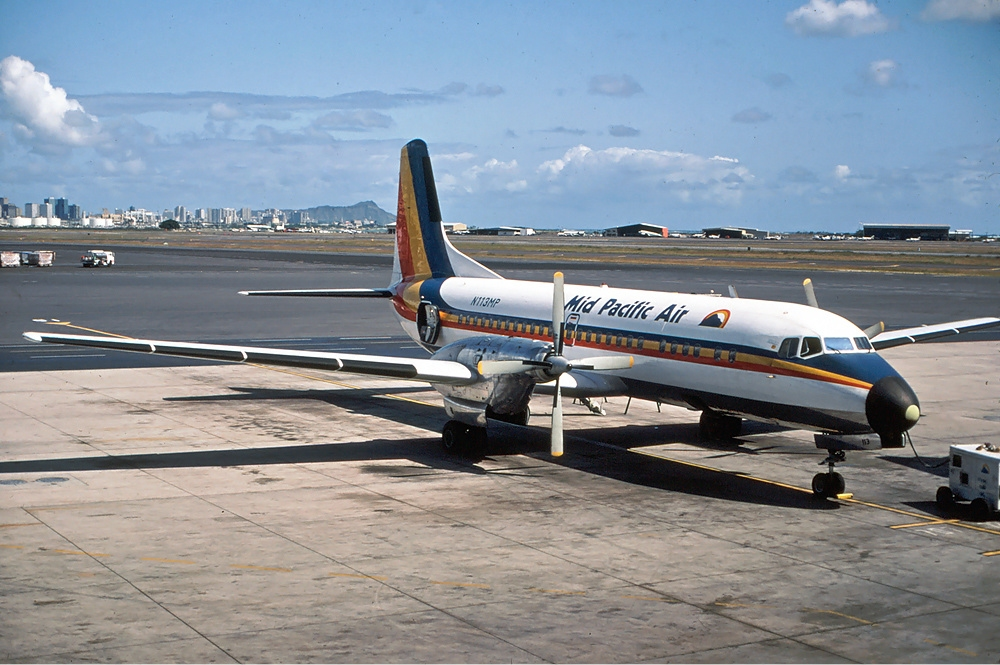
Mid Pacific Air NAMC YS-11A-659 at Honolulu International Airport in 1982

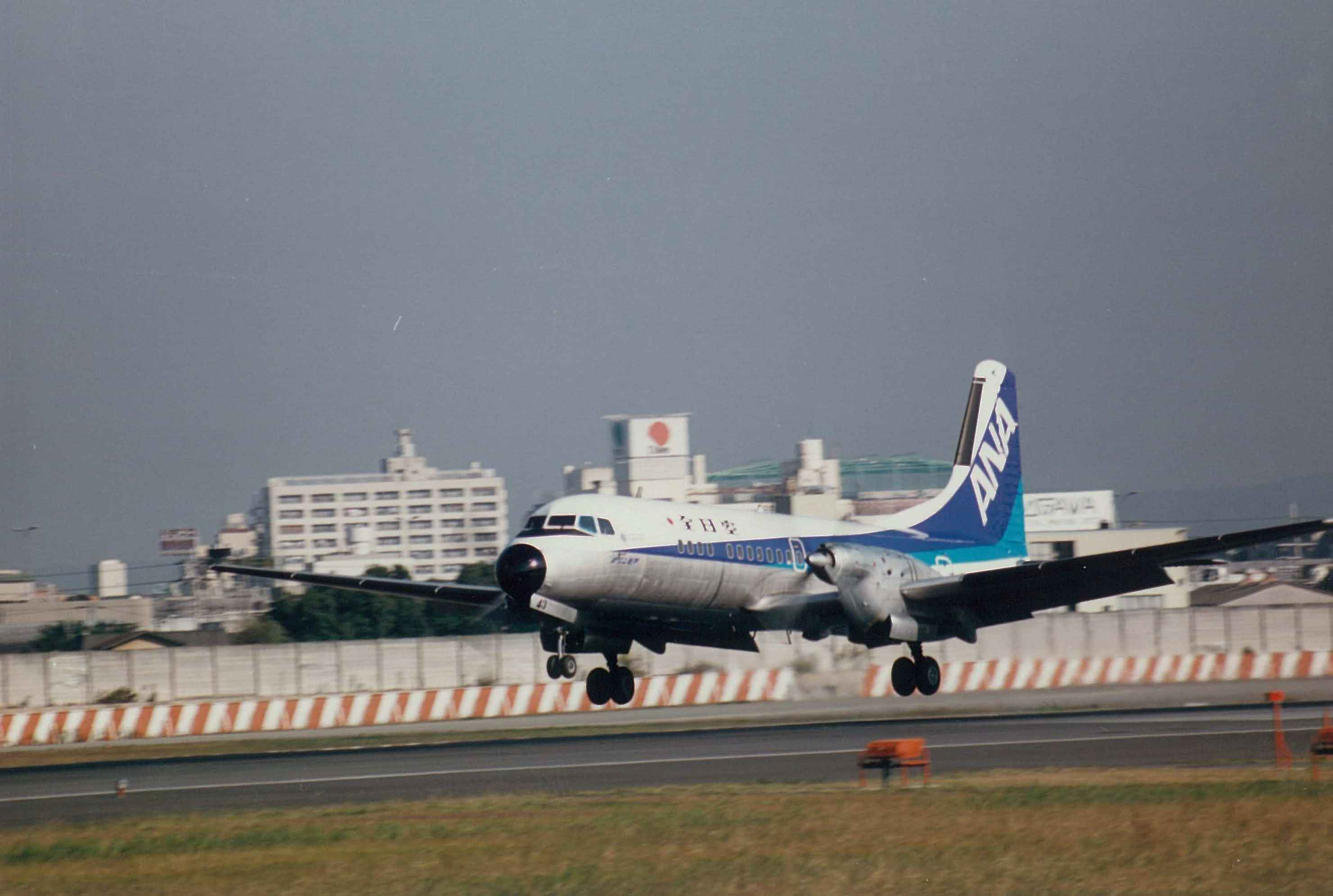
All Nippon Airways in 1990

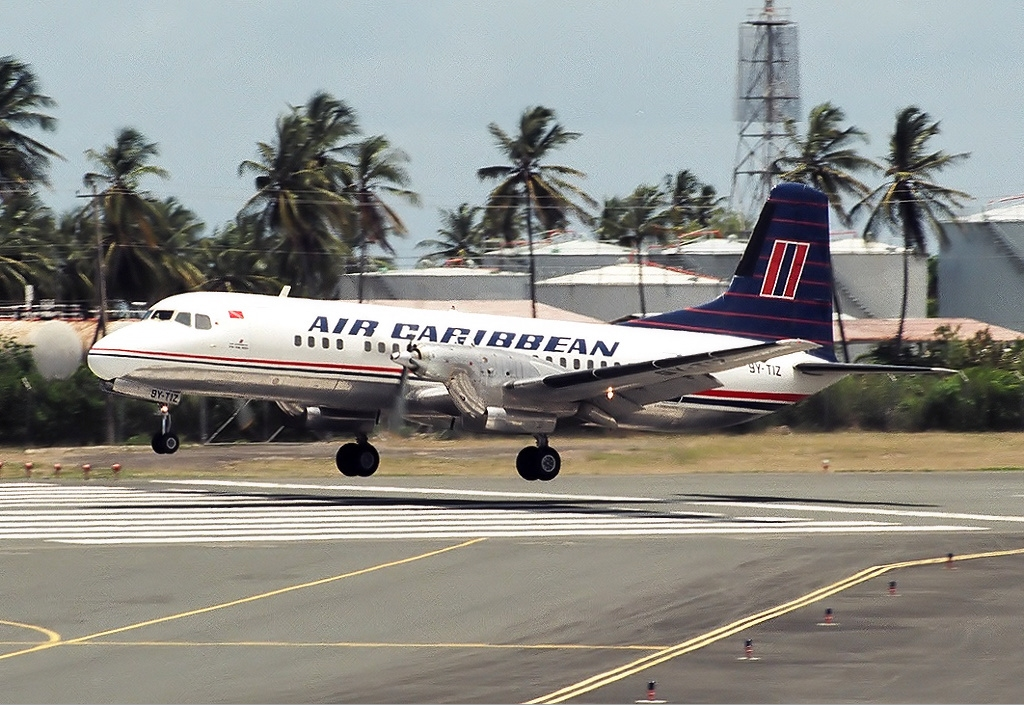
Air Caribbean YS-11 in 1999

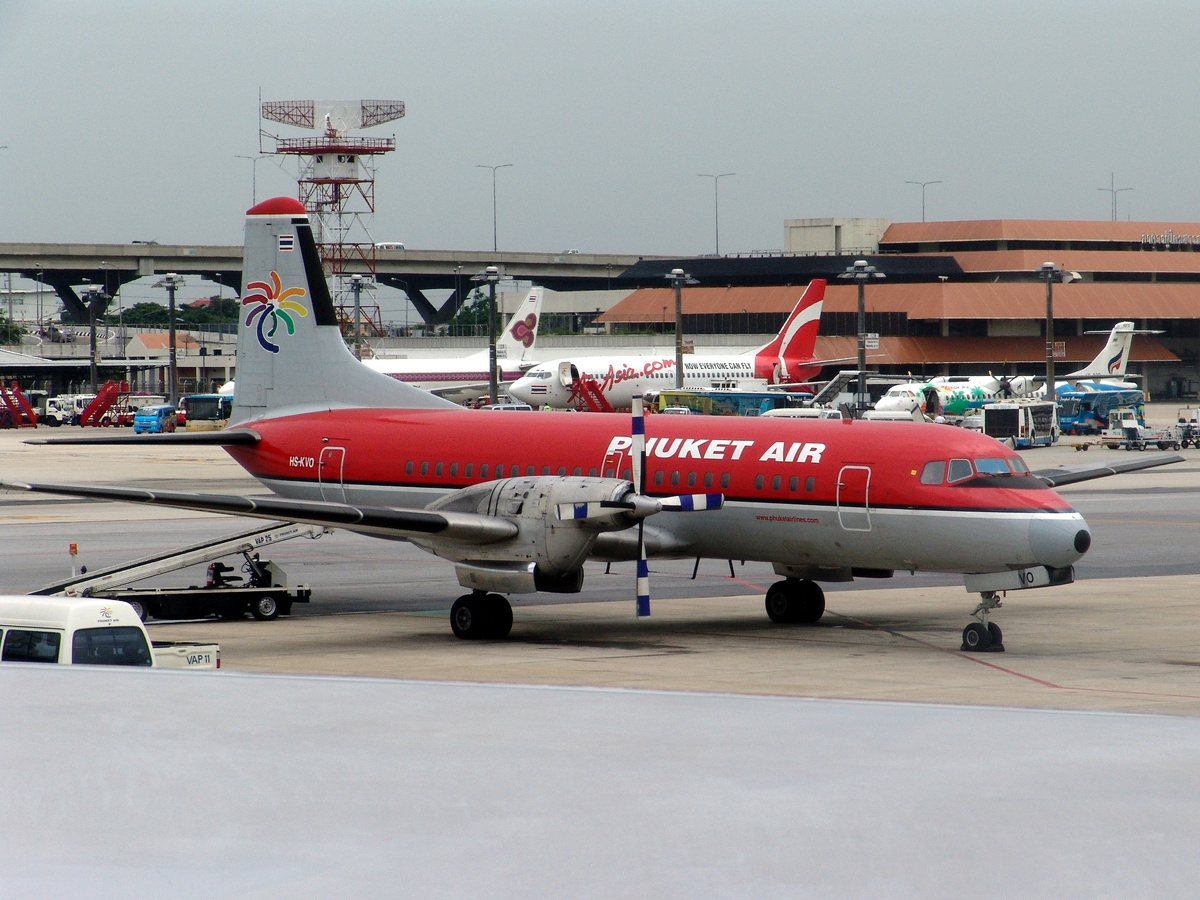
Phuket Air YS-11A-200 in 2005

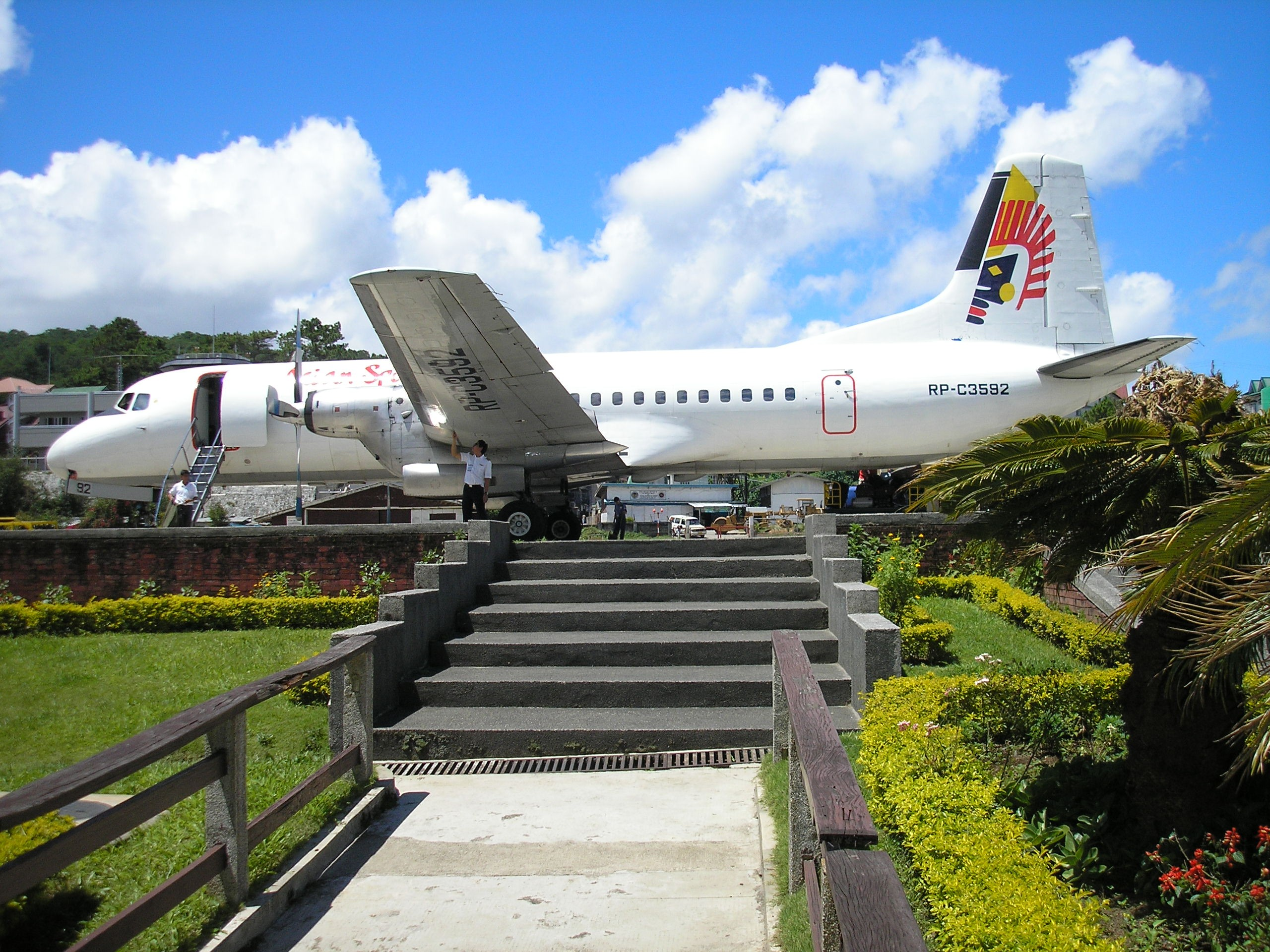
YS-11 at Loakan Airport, Baguio City, Philippines in 2006

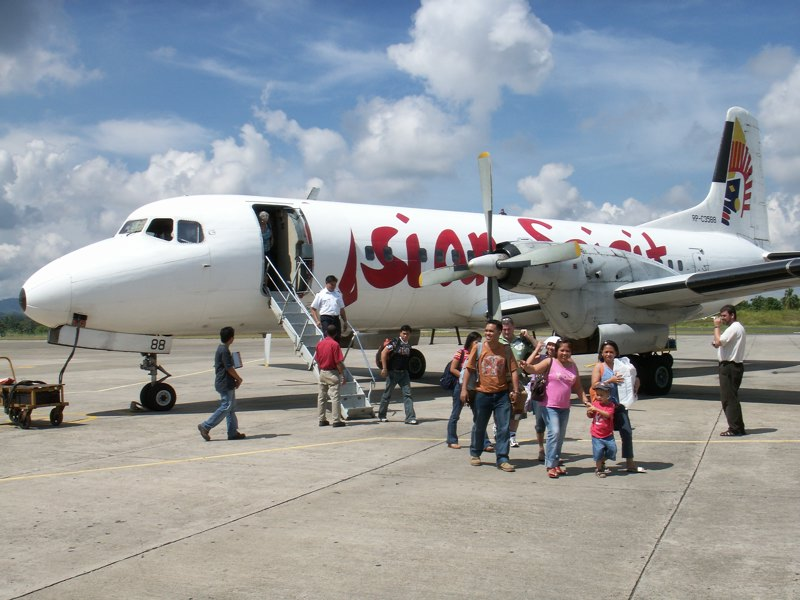
An Asian Spirit YS-11 in the Philippines in 2007

=== Civil operators ===
Former and present operators of the NAMC YS-11 include:

Argentina

- Aerolíneas Argentinas
- Aerotransportes Litoral Argentino
- Austral Líneas Aéreas

Aruba

- Air Aruba

Brazil

- Cruzeiro do Sul
- VASP

Brunei

- BIMP - EAGA Air Alliance

Canada

- Norcanair
- Transair Ltd

Democratic Republic of the Congo

- Societe Generale d'Alimentation

Egypt

- Pyramid Airlines

Gabon

- Trans Gabon Airlines
- Gabon Express
- Gabon Express Cargo

Gambia

- Gambia AW

Greece

- Olympic Airways

Indonesia

- Bouraq Indonesia Airlines
- Pelita Air Service
- Mandala Airlines
- Merpati Nusantara Airlines

Ivory Coast

- Air Afrique

Japan

- Air Nippon
- All Nippon Airways
- Japan Air Lines
- Japan Air System
- Japan Domestic Airlines
- Japan TransOcean Air
- Toa Airways
- Toa Domestic Airlines
- Nihon Kinkyori Airlines
- Southwest Air Lines Japan

Mexico

- Aerolitoral
- Aerodan Cargo
- Gacela Air Cargo
- AeroSierra
- ALCON Servicios Aereos

Peru

- Líneas Aéreas Nacionales S.A.

Philippines

- Philippine Airlines
- Air Philippines
- Air Link International Airways
- Airlink International Aviation College
- 2GO
- Aboitiz Air
- Asian Spirit
- Aero Majestic Airways
- South Phoenix Airways

South Korea

- Korean Air
- Korean Air Cargo

Taiwan

- China Airlines

Tanzania

- Air Star Zanzibar

Trinidad and Tobago

- Air Caribbean

Thailand

- Phuket Air
- Air Phoenix

United Arab Emirates

- Global Air Cargo

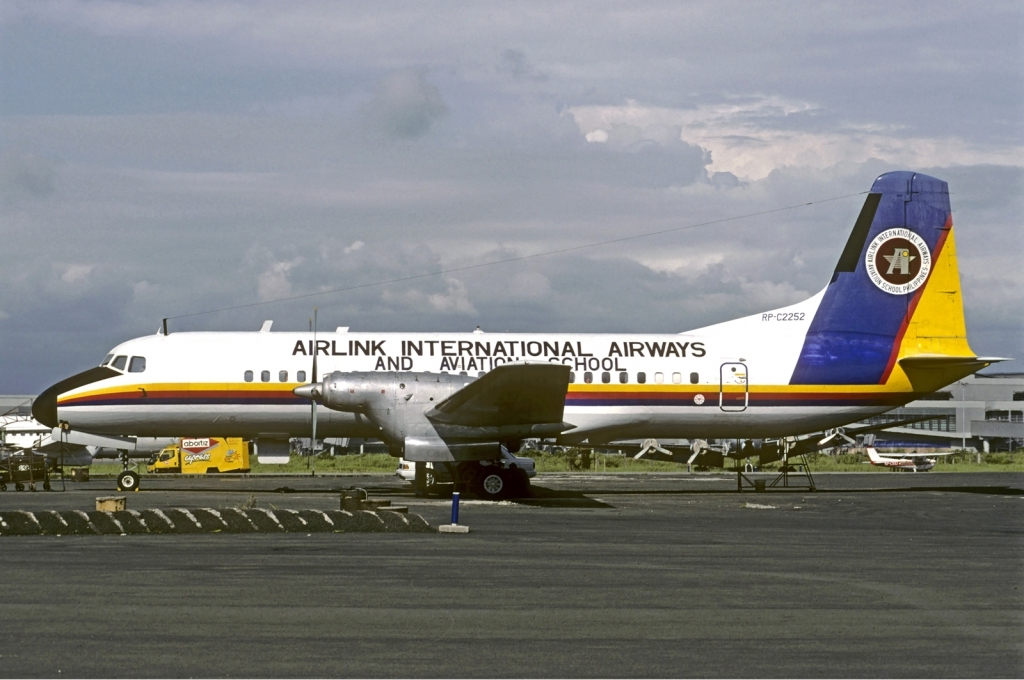
An Airlink International Airways NAMC YS-11 at Ninoy Aquino International Airport.

United States

- American Eagle
- Continental Express
- Piedmont Airlines
- Simmons Airlines
- Reeve Aleutian Airways
- Provincetown-Boston Airlines (PBA)
- Pinehurst Airlines
- MPAC
- Midwest Air Charter/Airborne Express
- Far West Airlines
- Fort Worth Airlines
- Hawaiian Airlines
- Pacific Southwest Airlines (PSA) - operated as training aircraft
- Mid Pacific Air
- Tauk Tours
- United States Postal Service

=== Military operators ===
Japan

- Japan Air Self-Defense Force YS-11EB

=== Former military operators ===
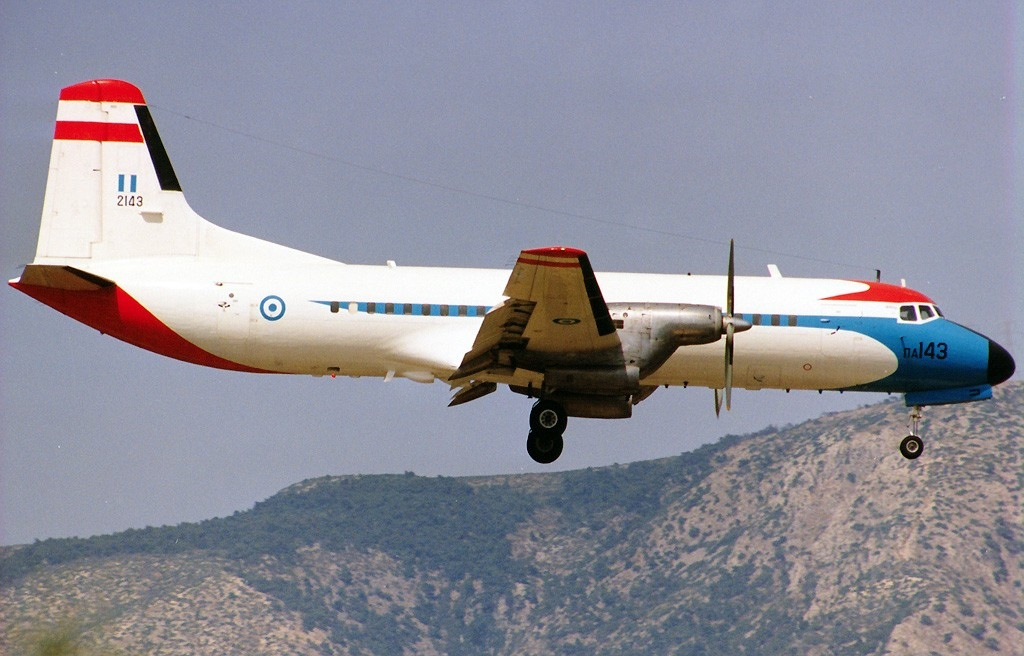
NAMC YS-11A of the Greek Air Force (1993)

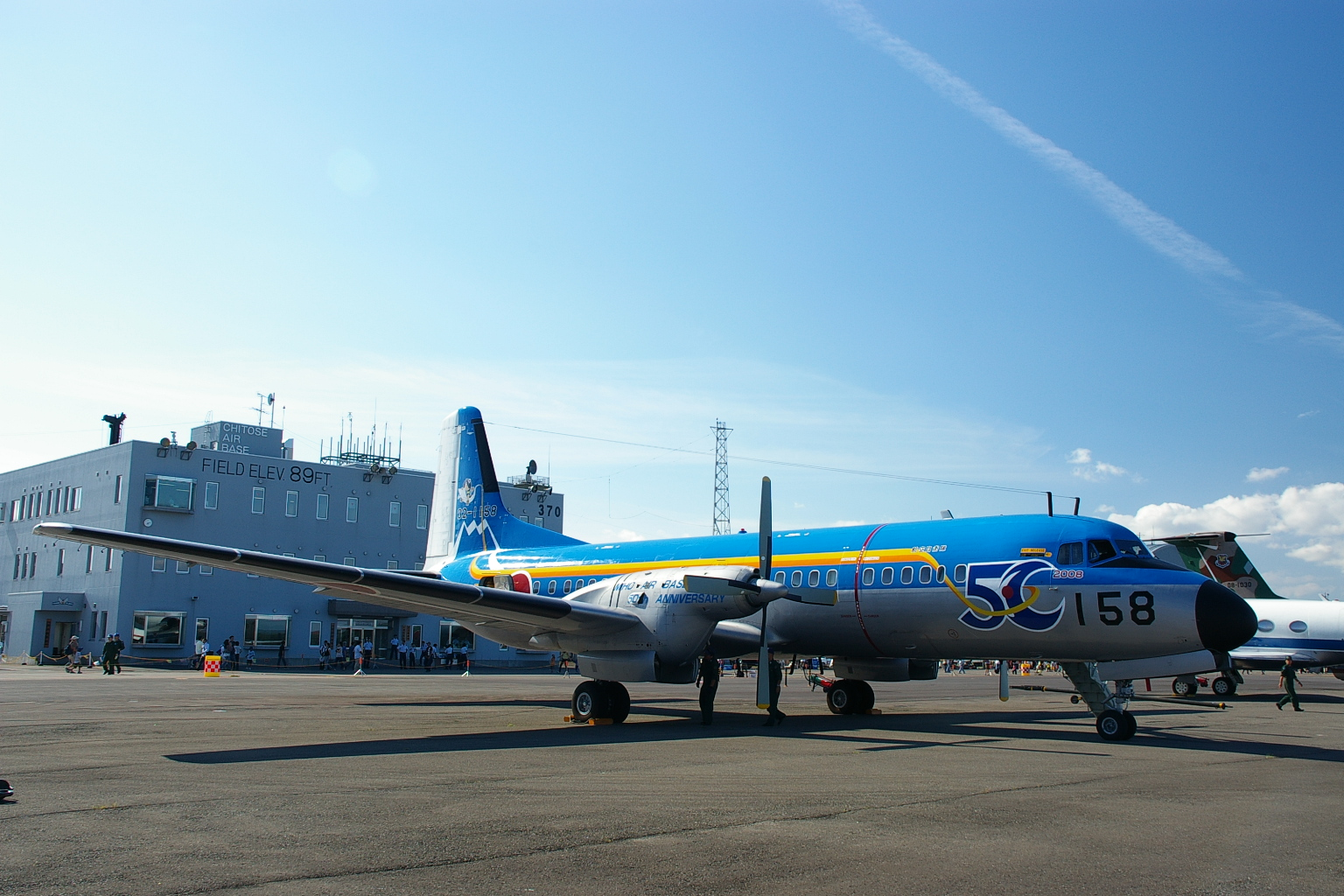
YS-11P Special painting for the 50th anniversary (2008)

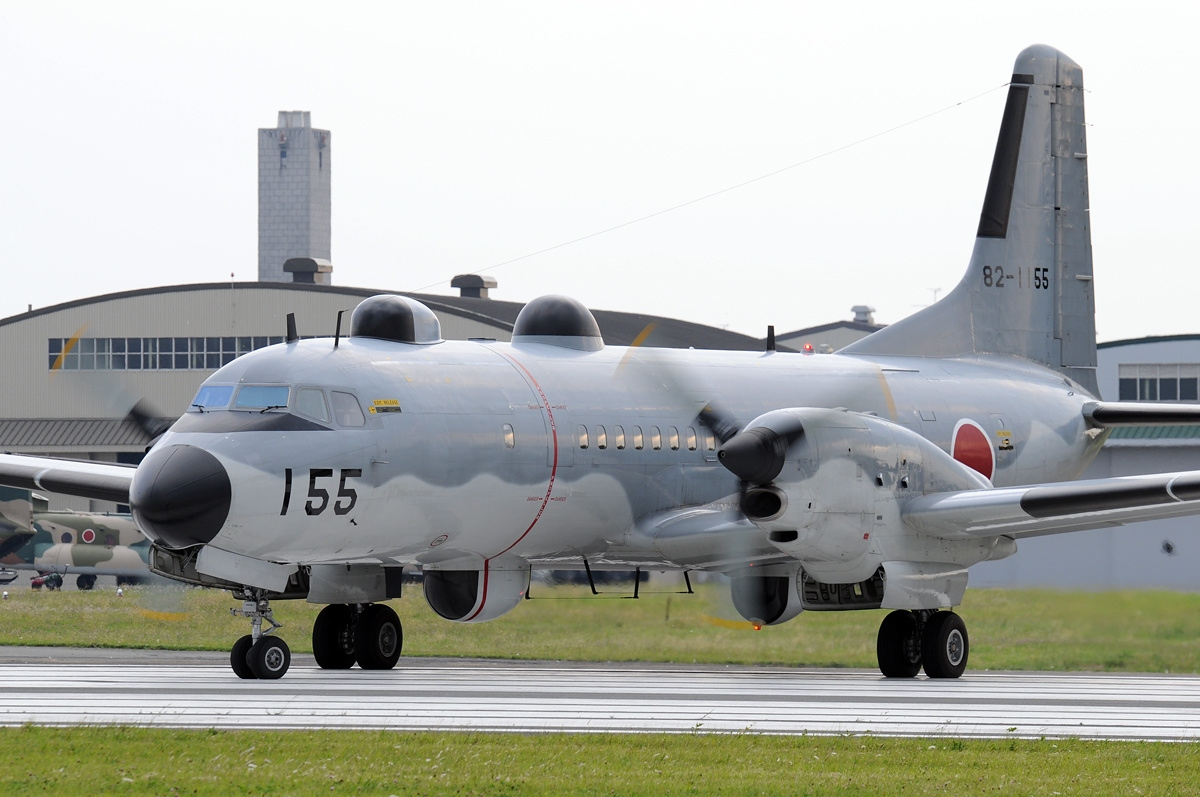
YS-11EB (2010)

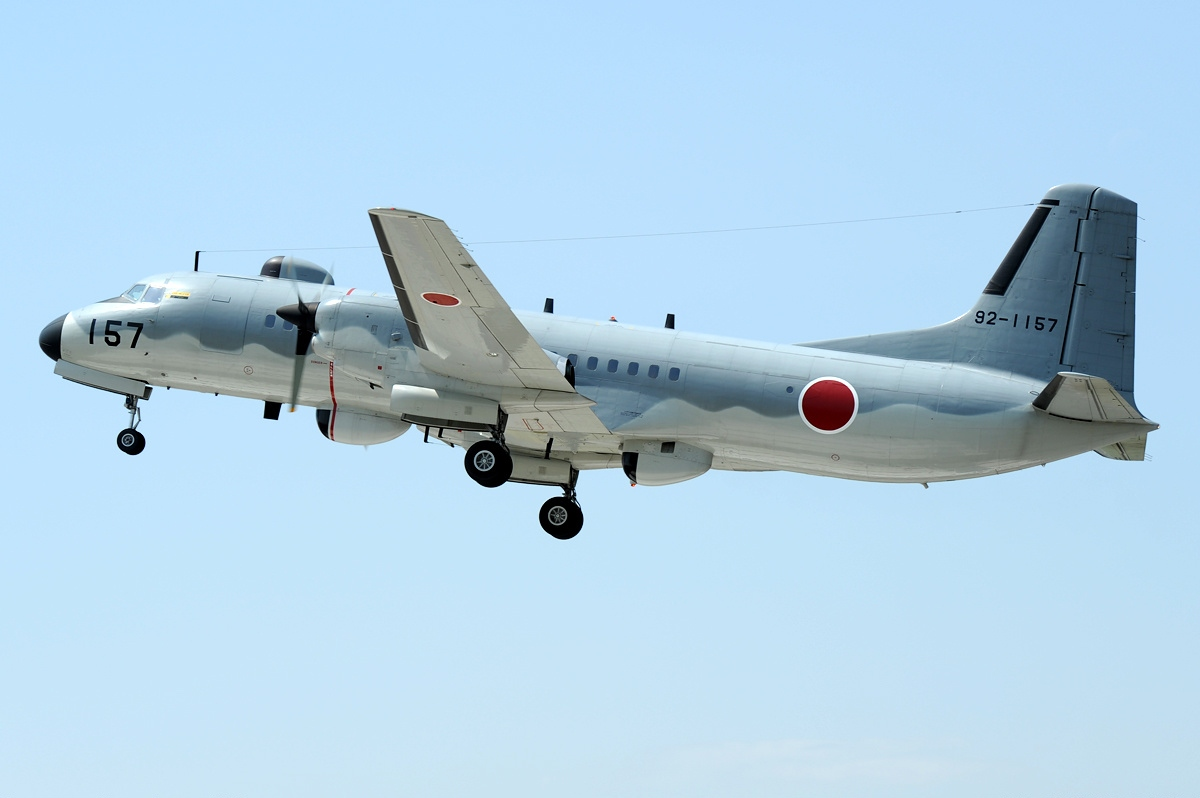
YS-11EB (2011)

Greece

- Greek Air Force – 6 ex-Olympic Airways YS-11A aircraft were supplied in 1981.

Japan

- Japan Air Self-Defense Force
  - 401st Tactical Airlift Squadron (1969–1989)
  - 402nd Tactical Airlift Squadron (1968–2001)
  - 403rd Tactical Airlift Squadron YS-11P (1978–2017)
  - Flight Check Squadron YS-11FC (–2021)
  - Electronic Warfare Squadron YS-11EA
  - Electronic Intelligence Squadron YS-11EB
- Japan Maritime Self-Defense Force
  - Air Transport Squadron 61 YS-11M/M-A (1971–2014)
- Japan Coast Guard (1969–2011)

JSDF delivery breakdown: JASDF
2 YS-11EA for Electronic Warfare
4 YS-11EB for ELINT
3 YS-11FC for Flight Checker
1 YS-11NT for Navigation Trainer
3 YS-11P for Passenger/VIP Transport

JMSDF
2 YS-11M for Freighter
2 YS-11M-A for Freighter
6 YS-11T-A for MPA trainer

Philippines

- Philippine Air Force - One YS-11 used as presidential transport.

== Accidents and incidents ==
There have been over twenty hull loss accidents involving YS-11 aircraft.

- 13 November 1966, All Nippon Airways Flight 533 crashed into the sea near Matsuyama, Japan with the loss of all five crew and 45 passengers.
- 20 October 1969, All Nippon Airways Flight 104 overran the runway at Miyazaki Airport, Japan. All four crew and 49 passengers survived.
- 11 December 1969, a Korean Air flight from Gangneung to Seoul was hijacked by a North Korean agent and flown to Sǒndǒk Airfield near Wonsan. The aircraft was damaged on landing and written off. The aircraft, its crew, and seven passengers are still held in North Korean territory.
- 12 August 1970, China Airlines Flight 206 crashed into Yuan Mountain on approach to Taipei, Taiwan. Two crew and 12 passengers were killed.
- 1 April 1971, a Merpati Nusantara Airlines YS-11 made a wheels-up landing at Kemayoran Airport, Jakarta, Indonesia while on a training flight.
- 3 July 1971, Toa Domestic Airlines Flight 63 flew into Yokotsu Mountain while on approach to Hakodate Airport, Japan. All four crew and 64 passengers were killed, the worst loss of life in an accident involving the YS-11.
- 7 November 1971, A VASP YS-11 was destroyed by fire after a candle was lit inside when the aircraft was being guarded overnight after being bogged down at Aragarças Airport in Aragarças, Brazil. Both guards were killed.
- 12 April 1972, a VASP flight between São Paulo and Rio de Janeiro crashed 50 kilometres (31 mi) north of Rio de Janeiro. All four crew and 21 passengers were killed.
- 18 October 1972, a Cruzeiro do Sul YS-11 overshot the runway at Congonhas Airport, São Paulo and was damaged beyond repair.
- 21 October 1972, Olympic Airways Flight 506 en route from Corfu (Kerkyra) to Athens crashed into the sea in Voula whilst attempting an approach to Ellinikon International Airport, Athens, in a heavy storm. One crew member (the co-pilot) and 36 passengers were killed, while the captain, the two stewardesses and 16 passengers survived.
- 23 October 1973, a VASP YS-11 overran the runway at Santos Dumont Airport, Rio de Janeiro after a rejected take-off and ended up in Guanabara Bay. Eight passengers were killed.
- 5 March 1974, a Pacific Southwest Airlines YS-11 crash landed in the desert 14 kilometres (8.7 mi) east of Borrego Springs, California while on a training flight. Aircraft was written off.
- 6 November 1974, a Reeve Aleutian Airways YS-11 was written off in a hangar fire at Anchorage, Alaska.
- 28 May 1975, TOA Domestic Airlines Flight 621 was damaged beyond repair in a landing accident at Osaka International Airport when a tyre burst and the aircraft departed the runway.
- 23 November 1976, Olympic Airways Flight 830 flew into Mount Metaxas near the village of Servia in Kozani, Greece, in low clouds and almost zero visibility. All four crew and 46 passengers were killed.
- 29 April 1977, a Cruzeiro YS-11 departed the runway on landing at Ministro Victor Konder International Airport, Navegantes, Brazil.
- 17 July 1977, a Philippine Airlines YS-11 ditched on approach to Mactan–Cebu International Airport after an engine failure.
- 11 March 1983, Nihon Kinkyori Airlines Flight 497 undershot the runway at Nakashibetsu Airport, Japan.
- 13 January 1987, a Mid Pacific Air YS-11 force landed in a field at Remington, Indiana after both engines were mismanaged.
- 10 January 1988, TOA Domestic Airlines Flight 670 overran the runway at Miho-Yonago Airport, Yonago, Japan after a rejected take-off and ended up in the sea. Aircraft had not been de-iced prior to take-off.
- 15 March 1989, a Mid Pacific Air YS-11 undershot the runway at Purdue University Airport, Lafayette, Indiana due to loss of pitch control caused by icing on the tail. The aircraft was on a positioning flight, both crew members were killed.
- 6 March 1992, an Airborne Express YS-11 made a wheels-up landing at Airborne Airpark, Wilmington, Ohio while on a training flight due to pilot error.
- 24 June 1996, an Air Philippines YS-11 struck a ground power unit while taxiing at Naga Airport, Naga City. Aircraft was destroyed in the subsequent fire.
- 16 February 2000, Air Nippon Flight 354 departed the runway at Okadama Airport, Sapporo, Japan and collided with a bank of snow.
- 3 November 2001, a YS-11 being prepared for delivery to an airline in Burundi was destroyed by a fire caused by a stray firework at London Southend Airport.
- 11 September 2005, Phuket Airlines Flight 326 skids off the runway at Mae Sot Airport, Thailand.
- 2 January 2008, Asian Spirit Flight 321 suffered an undercarriage collapse on landing at Masbate Airport, Philippines.
- 28 September 2009, Japanese Maritime Self-Defense Force YS-11M-A serial number 9044 overran the runway upon landing at Ozuki Air Field and was substantially damaged.

== Aircraft on display ==
Brazil

- 2080 – YS-11A-200 on static display as a restaurant in Tijucas, Santa Catarina.

Greece

- 2137 (Hellenic Air Force) - YS-11A-220 at the Elefsis Heritage Park

Japan

- JA8611 – YS-11 prototype at the Museum of Aeronautical Science in Narita, Chiba.
- JA8731 - YS-11A-213 at the Kakamigahara Aerospace Museum.
- JA8732 – YS-11A-213 at the Tokorozawa Aviation Memorial Park in Tokorozawa, Saitama.
- JA8733 - YS-11A-213 at Saga Airport
- JA8734 – YS-11A-500R at Tajima Airport in Toyooka, Hyogo Prefecture.
- JA8743 - YS-11A-213 at Sanuki Kodomono Kuni amusement park near Takamatsu Airport.
- JA8766 - YS-11A-227 at Misawa Aviation & Science Museum
- JA8809 - YS-11A-202 at the Michinoku Traditional Wooden Boat Museum.
- 52-1152 (JASDF) at the Aichi Museum of Flight in Komaki, Aichi Prefecture.
- JA8610 The first mass-produced YS-11 has been in storage at Haneda Airport since 1999, where it has been maintained and kept airworthy by the National Museum of Nature and Science and is occasionally available for public viewing.

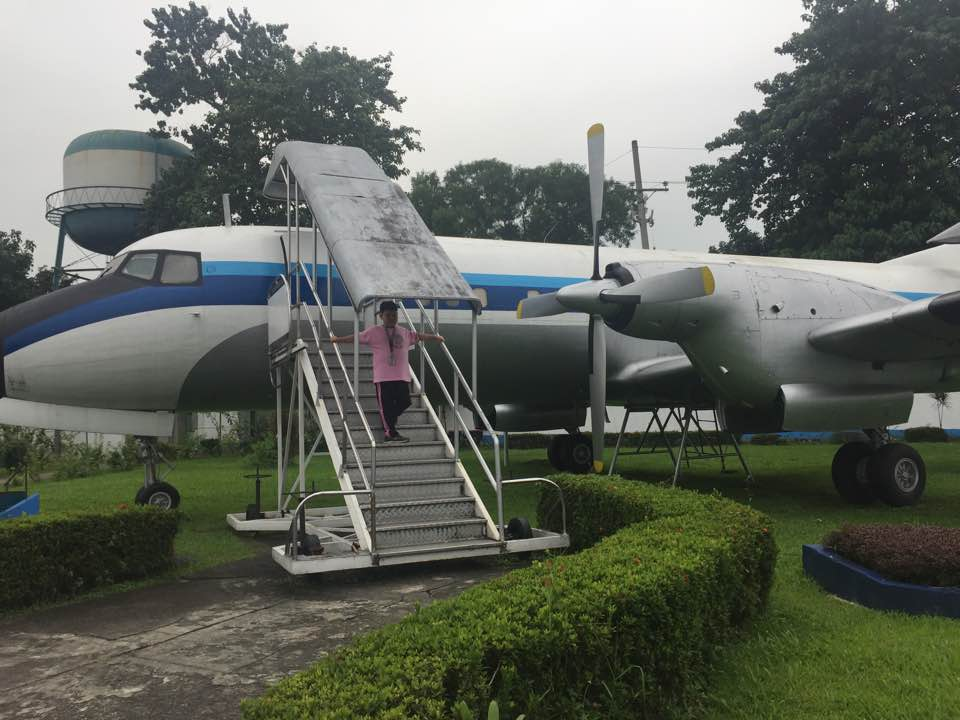
A NAMC YS-11 on display at Philippine Air Force Aerospace Museum (2017)

Philippines

- RP-77 – YS-11A-523 at the Philippine Air Force Aerospace Museum in Manila, National Capital.

Thailand

- HS-APA YS-11A-227 at Jesada Technik Museum
- HS-KCU YS-11A-213 at Nong Khor

United States

- P4-KFD – YS-11-120 on static display at the Grissom Air Museum near Peru, Indiana.

== Specifications (YS-11A-200) ==
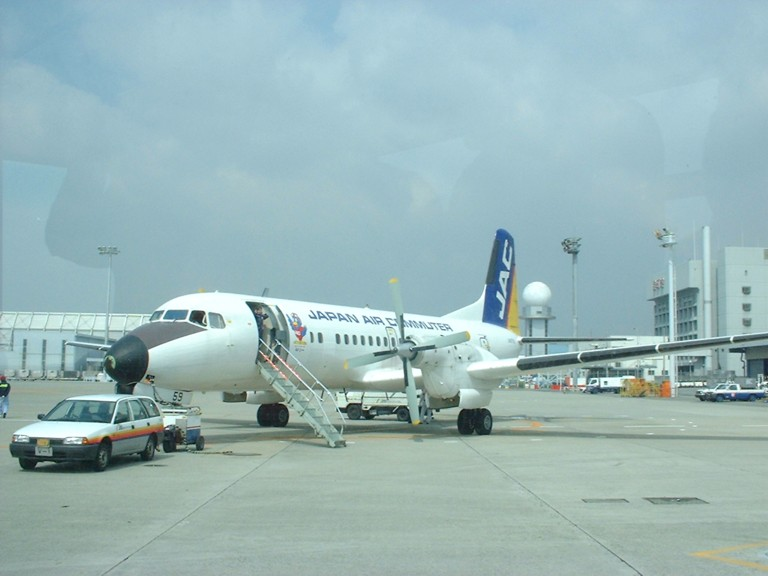
A JAC NAMC YS-11 (2003)

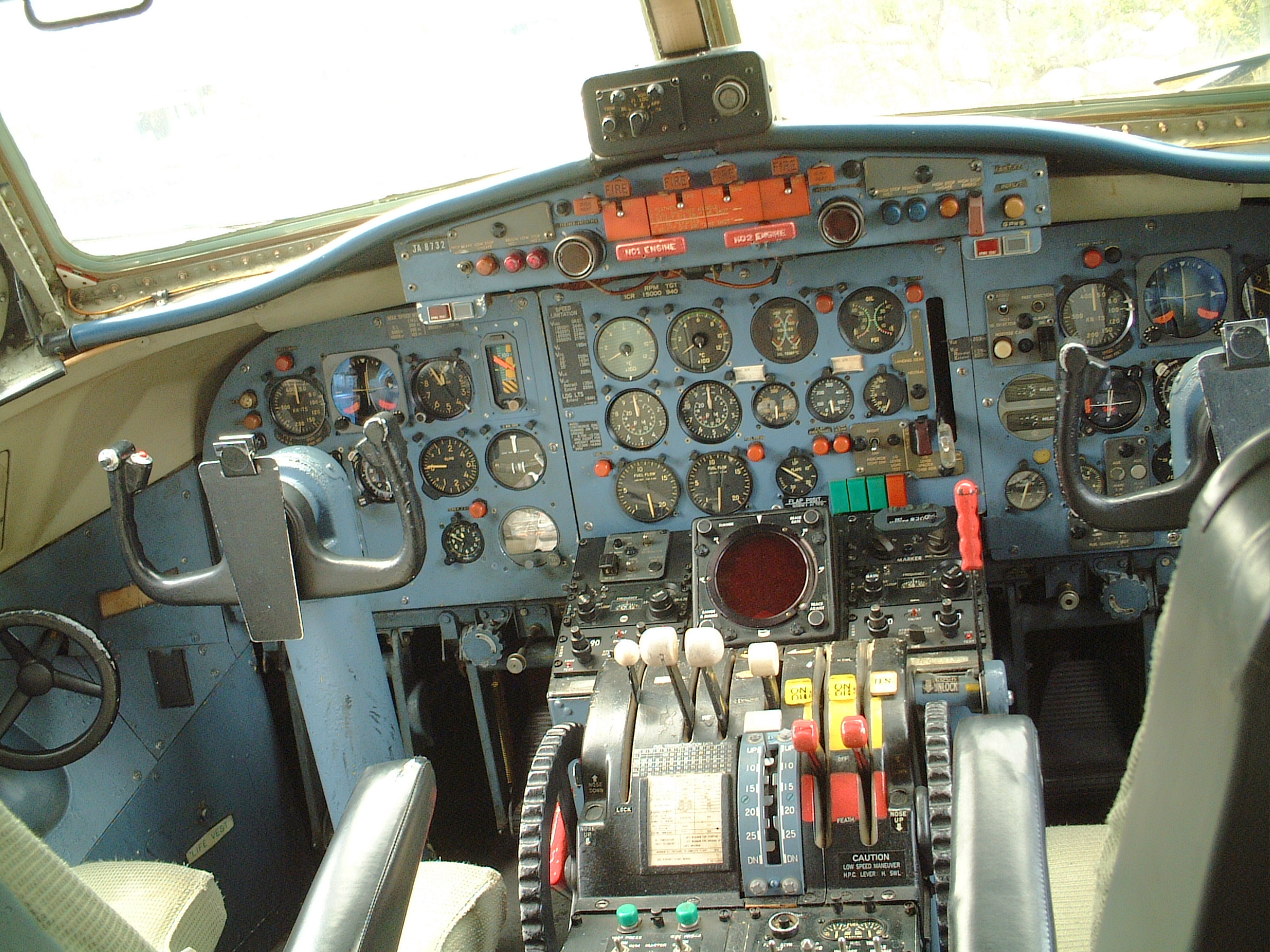
Cockpit

Data from The Observers Book of Aircraft, Jane's all the World's Aircraft 1970–71

General characteristics

- Crew: 2
- Capacity: 64 passengers / 6,604 kg (14,559 lb)
- Length: 26.3 m (86 ft 3 in)
- Wingspan: 32 m (105 ft 0 in)
- Height: 8.98 m (29 ft 6 in)
- Wing area: 94.83 m^{2} (1,020.7 sq ft)
- Aspect ratio: 10.8
- Airfoil: root: NACA 64A-218; tip: NACA 64A-412
- Empty weight: 15,396 kg (33,942 lb) operating weight, empty
- Max takeoff weight: 24,500 kg (54,013 lb)
- Maximum landing weight: 24,000 kg (52,911 lb)
- Powerplant: 2 × Rolls-Royce Dart Mk.542-10K turboprop engines, 2,250 kW (3,020 hp) each
- Propellers: 4-bladed constant-speed fully-feathering reversible propellers

Performance

- Cruise speed: 469 km/h (291 mph, 253 kn) maximum at 4,575 m (15,010 ft)
- Economical cruising speed: 452 km/h (281 mph; 244 kn) at 6,100 m (20,013 ft)
- Stall speed: 140 km/h (87 mph, 76 kn) at MLW, flaps down
- Never exceed speed: 546 km/h (339 mph, 295 kn) below 4,695 m (15,404 ft)

Mach 0.601 above 4,695 m (15,404 ft)

- Range: 2,110 km (1,310 mi, 1,140 nmi) max fuel without centre-section bag tanks, no reserves

1,090 km (680 mi; 590 nmi) with max payload, no reserves
3,215 km (1,998 mi; 1,736 nmi) max fuel with centre-section bag tanks, no reserves

- Service ceiling: 6,982 m (22,907 ft)
- Service ceiling, one engine: 2,740 m (8,990 ft)
- Rate of climb: 6.2 m/s (1,220 ft/min)
- Wing loading: 258 kg/m^{2} (53 lb/sq ft)
- Power/mass: 0.25 kW/kg (0.15 hp/lb)
- Take-off distance to 10 m (33 ft): 1,110 m (3,642 ft)
- Landing distance from 15 m (49 ft): 660 m (2,165 ft) at MLW

Avionics
various weather radars

== In popular culture ==
In railroad journals, YS-11 was linked to the 0 Series Shinkansen, another Japanese-made form of transportation that debuted around the time of the 1964 Olympics. Additionally, the Shinkansen and the YS-11 were both developed by individuals who were involved with the creation of military aircraft (this was to be expected with an airplane like the YS-11, but men like Migi Tadanao and Matsudaira Tadashi were also involved with the Shinkansen).

== See also ==
Aircraft of comparable role, configuration, and era

- An-24 / An-26
- Avro 748
- BAe ATP
- Convair 580
- Convair 600/640
- Fokker F27 Friendship
- Handley Page Dart Herald
- Vickers Viscount

Related lists

- List of civil aircraft
