= Airlink (disambiguation) =

Airlink is the name of a South African regional airline.

Airlink may also refer to:

== Airlines ==
- Airlink (Papua New Guinea), Papua New Guinea
- Airlink (Finland), Finland
- Zimbabwe Airlink of Zimbabwe
- Eswatini Airlink of Eswatini
- Air Link of Australia
- Air Link International Airways of the Philippines
- Airlink Zambia of Zambia
- Airwaves Airlink of Zambia
- Northwest Airlink, of the United States
- Vieques Air Link of Puerto Rico

== Other ==
- Airlink (helicopter), a helicopter shuttle service which operated between Gatwick and Heathrow airports in the UK between 1978 and 1986
- AirLink Communications, a company acquired by Sierra Wireless
- AirLinks, a former brand used by National Express Coaches
