= Nihon Aircraft Manufacturing Corporation =

Aircraft manufacturer in Japan

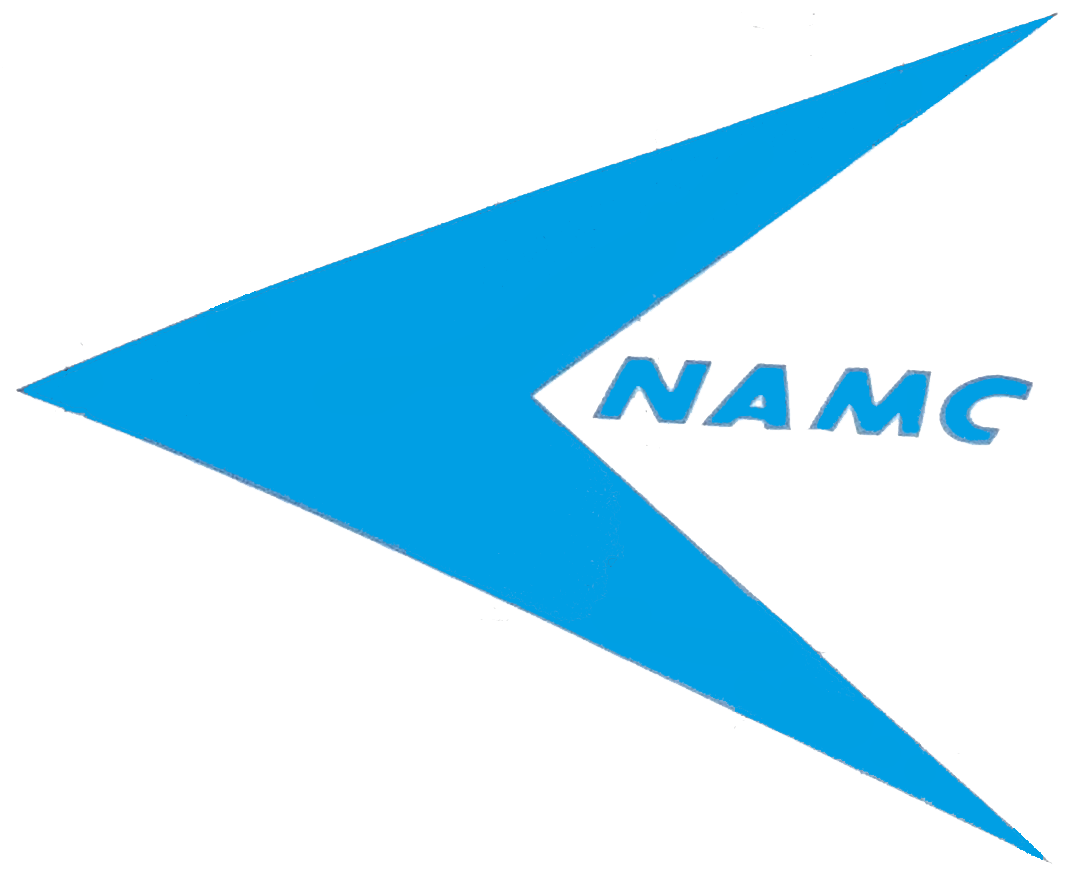
- Company type: Joint-owned corporation
- Industry: Aerospace
- Founded: May 1957
- Defunct: 23 March 1983
- Fate: Disbanded
- Products: Aircraft

The Nihon Aircraft Manufacturing Corporation (Japanese: 日本航空機製造株式会社 Nihon Kōkūki Seizō Kabushiki-gaisha), or NAMC, was the manufacturer of Japan's only post-World War 2 production airliner to enter service, the YS-11.

NAMC was a consortium of several manufacturing companies and university professors. It was founded during April 1957 by executives from Mitsubishi Heavy Industries, Fuji Heavy Industries, Shinmeiwa Manufacturing, Sumitomo, Nihon Kogata Hikoki, Showa Aircraft, and Kawasaki Heavy Industries to design and manufacture a Japanese civilian turboprop airliner to replace the obsolete Douglas DC-3.

The resulting aircraft, the YS-11, was the only moderately successful civilian airliner to be produced by Japan after World War 2 and the only airliner designed and produced in Japan for over 50 years until the Mitsubishi Regional Jet first flew in 2015. Achieving a production run of 182, the YS-11 was not a commercial success for NAMC; the consortium's ambitions of producing a turbofan-powered successor were unrealised, and burdened by debt, the company disbanded on 23 March 1983.

== History ==
=== Background ===
Although Japan had designed and manufactured a number of military and civilian aircraft before and during the Second World War, the nation had been forbidden under the Potsdam Declaration from engaging in the production of airplanes following the war that could be used to rearm. These restrictions, however, had been loosened by the United States during the Korean War, opening up the possibility for a Japanese company to produce a commercial aircraft.

During the mid-to-late 1950s, the Japanese Ministry of International Trade and Industry (MITI) identified a requirement for a short-haul airliner to replace Douglas DC-3s flying on Japan's domestic routes, and encouraged Japan's aircraft industry to collaborate to develop and produce a domestic airliner to meet this need. Towards this purpose, in May 1957, the Commercial Transport Design Research Association was established and the availability of government subsidies was guaranteed. From the government's viewpoint, the development of such an airliner was viewed as a key initiative towards the post-war revival of the nation's aircraft companies, which came in addition to the ambition to become a competitor in the global airliner industry. Furthermore, while this requirement had been conceived primarily in a commercial context, there was an early recognition of the value for multiple branches of the Japanese Defense Agency (JDA) to be readily able to adopt the type as well. As a philosophy, this not only extended to the prospective airliner itself, but the various technologies involved in its development and manufacture.

=== Formation and workshare ===
In response to this political encouragement, during 1957, a joint venture between Mitsubishi Heavy Industries, Kawasaki Heavy Industries, Fuji Heavy Industries (better known as the parent company of automobile manufacturer Subaru), Shin Meiwa, Showa Aircraft Industry Company and Japan Aircraft Industry Company was established for the purpose of developing and manufacturing the envisioned airliner. Two years later, this partnership was formalised as the Nihon Aeroplane Manufacturing Company (NAMC). The ownership of NAMC was initially divided between the Japanese government, which held 54% of the shares, while the constituent aircraft manufacturers held an 18% stake and several components/materials suppliers owned 11%; the remaining shares were small stakes belonging to various banks, insurance companies, and stock firms who chose to invest in the programme. However, NAMC was essentially a "paper company", being reliant upon both personnel and infrastructure provided by its constituent manufacturers.

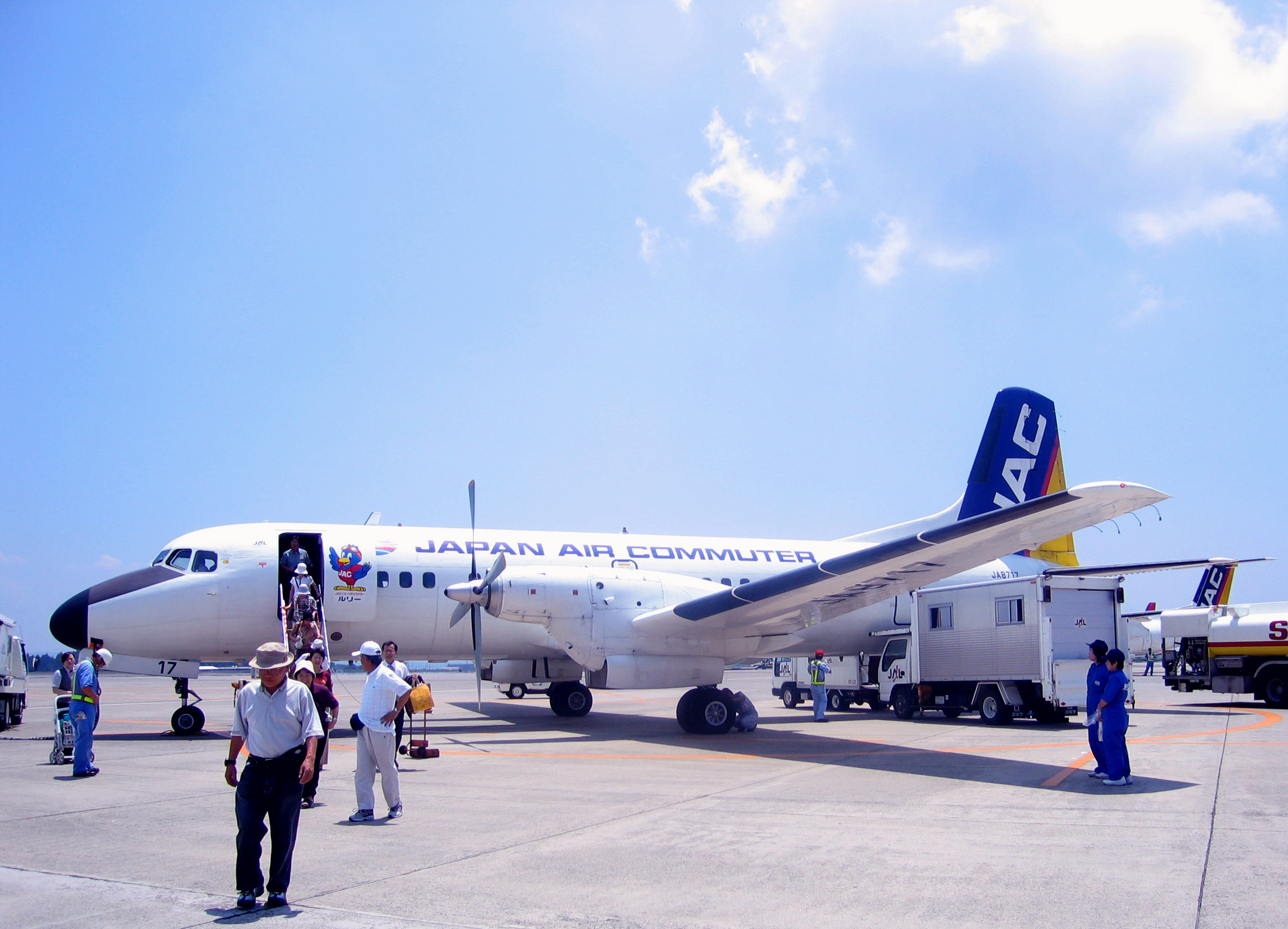
The NAMC YS-11

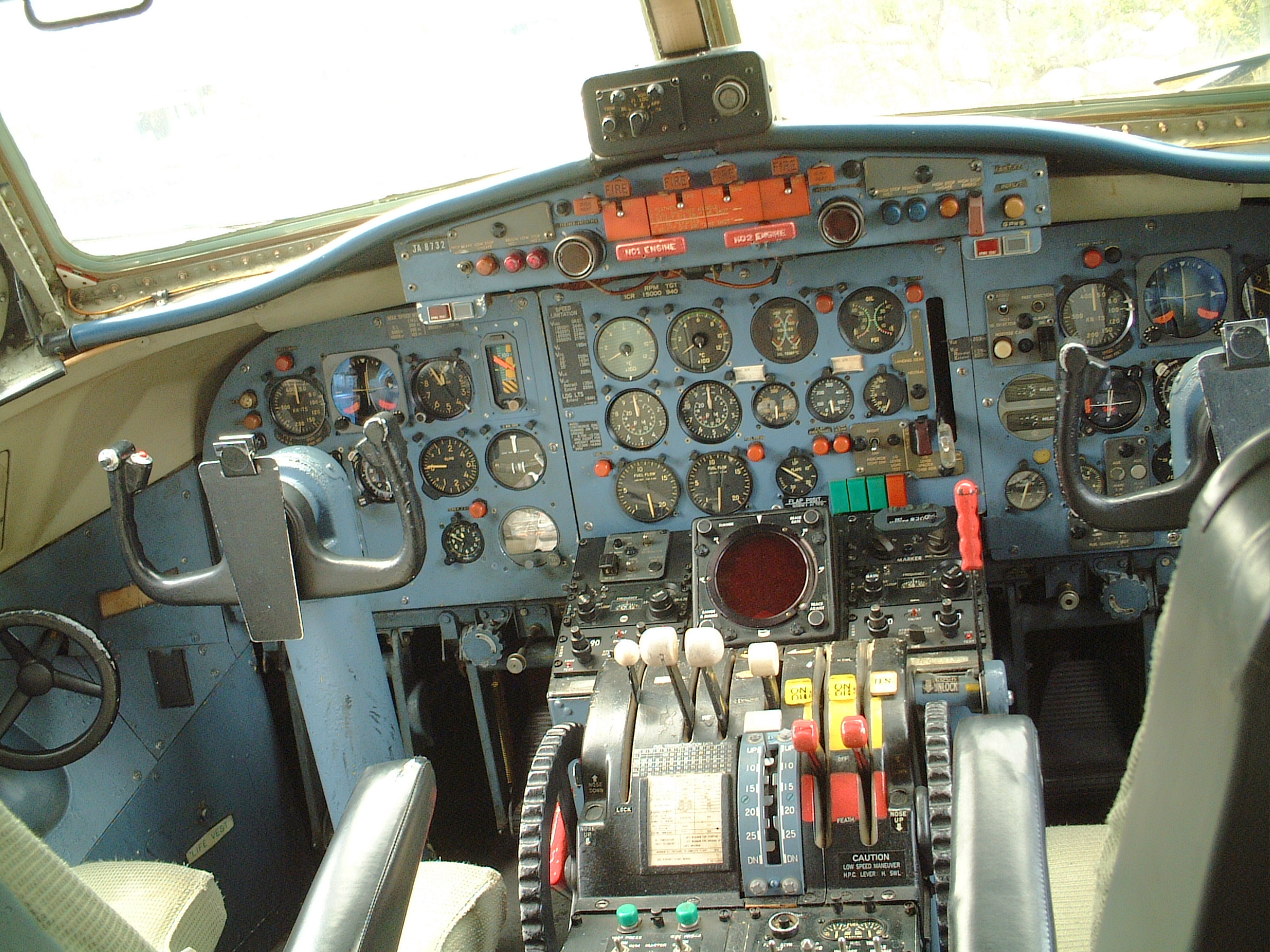
The cockpit of a YS-11, originally designed and built by Showa Aircraft

Each party was given responsibility over the design and manufacture of a different section of the plane; these were assigned as follows:

Company	Airplane Section	Percent of Completed Aircraft
Mitsubishi	Fore and middle fuselage	54.2%
Kawasaki	Wings and engine nacelles	25.3%
Fuji	Nose, pressurization system, and tail assembly	10.3%
Japan Aircraft	Decking, ailerons, and flaps	4.9%
Shinmeiwa	Aft fuselage, wing tips, and dorsal fin	4.7%
Showa	Cockpit and forward wing edge	0.5%
Sumitomo	Landing gear	0.1%

NAMC designed a low-winged twin-turboprop-engined monoplane, capable of seating up to 60 passengers, dubbed the YS-11. Amongst the design team was Jiro Horikoshi, who had previously been the designer of the famed wartime Mitsubishi A6M Zero fighter. Another prominent engineer on the project was Teruo Tojo, the second son of Prime Minister Hideki Tojo, who later became chairman of Mitsubishi Motors. The twin-engined YS-11 was projected as delivering similar operational performance to the four-engined British-built Vickers Viscount, while possessing 50% greater capacity than the similarly configured Dutch-built Fokker F27 Friendship. MITI supervised the pricing of the aircraft in order to ensure that it was competitive with the American-built Martin 4-0-4.

Although the tentative aircraft was mainly designed and manufactured in Japan, the engine selected to power the airliner was the 2,275 kW (3,050 ehp) Rolls-Royce Dart RDa.10/1 powerplant, which was both developed and produced by British-based company Rolls-Royce. Furthermore, according to author Stephen C Mercado, due to the lack of available domestic technology at the time, several of the key aircraft systems, such as cabin pressurization, were copied from foreign sources; such information was gleaned from a combination of Japanese airlines, trading companies and diplomats. Throughout the YS-11's production lifetime, its electronic equipment, avionics, mechanical and fuselage components were supplied by a combination of by Japanese companies and foreign suppliers.

=== Decline ===
During the late 1960s, a lack of significant international sales led to the YS-11 programme incurring persistent losses, the outstanding debt eventually growing to $600 million. Due to the organisation of the programme, the aircraft manufacturers themselves did not have any of this debt apportioned to themselves, NAMC being held solely responsible; Mercado criticised this approach as it meant there was no incentive for the individual companies to make cost savings while simultaneously guarantee profit to them on every plane produced. Furthermore, it had been alleged that some participants saw the YS-11 as only a training programme to develop their employees' skills, rather than a serious commercial initiative; some participants chose to rotate large numbers of staff in and out of the project for brief periods before re-tasking them to work on internal projects.

Marcado claims that the programme's operational mindset was closer to that of a military project than a commercial one, while a preoccupation with government-issued performance criteria obstructed considerations towards the actual desires of the commercial operators, such as operating costs and cabin configuration, that the YS-11 was marketed towards. As this was Japan's first, and for a long time only, post-war airliner, NAMC lacked any staff with experience in marketing towards airlines, a disadvantage against the salesmen of rival airframers. This failure to address a crucial factor in acquiring new customers has been attributed as a major contributing cause of the programme's poor commercial reception.

The end of the YS-11 programme was precipitated by the 1971 Smithsonian Agreement, which led to an appreciation in the value of the Japanese yen and the resulting impact upon the nation's economy. By this point, it was clear that there was little chance that the YS-11 could ever come close to breaking-even. These myriad factors contributed to the decision for production to be terminated after the completion of 182 aircraft. On 11 May 1973, the last YS-11 was delivered to the Japanese Maritime Self-Defence Force (JMSDF).

By the late 1970s, NAMC was hopeful on the prospects of launching a new programme to develop a jet-powered airliner, intending for it to directly compete with those being produced in the U.S. by companies such as Boeing and McDonnell Douglas. Unfortunately, because of the prohibitive cost of both manufacturing a jet engine in-house and also purchasing pre-fabricated engines from international companies such as Rolls-Royce, NAMC was forced to abandon its plans. Wracked by 36 billion Yen in debt (approximately $151 million based on the exchange rate at the time), NAMC was disbanded on 23 March 1983.
