= Flight 830 =

Flight 830 may refer to

- World Airways Flight 830, crashed on 19 September 1960
- Olympic Airways Flight 830, crashed on 23 November 1976
- Pan Am Flight 830, exploded on 11 August 1982
