= Electronic Intelligence Squadron (JASDF) =

- 電子測定機
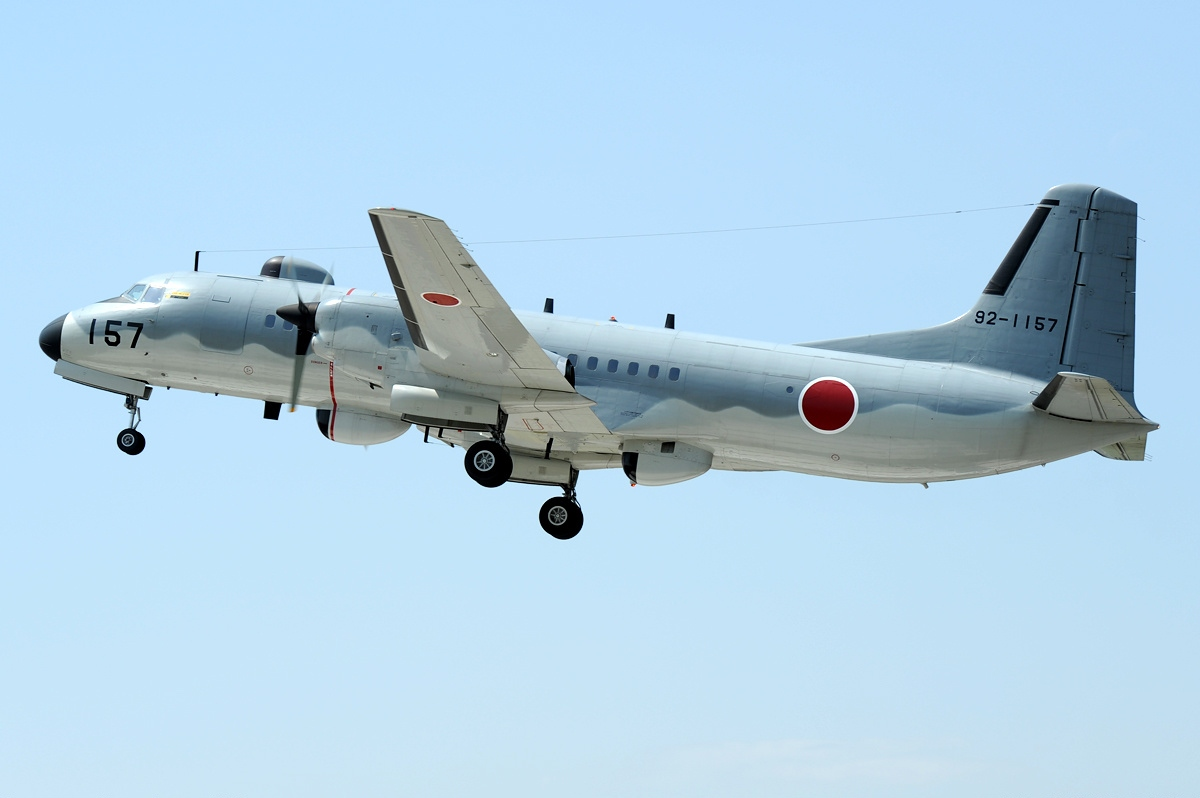
- NAMC YS-11EB of the Electronic Intelligence Squadron (2011)
- Country: Japan
- Branch: Japan Air Self-Defense Force
- Part of: Air Tactics Development Wing
- Garrison/HQ: Iruma Air Base

Aircraft flown
- Electronic warfare: YS-11EB

The Electronic Intelligence Squadron (電子測定機, denshisokuteiki) is a squadron of the Japan Air Self-Defense Force based at Iruma Air Base in Saitama Prefecture north of Tokyo. It operates under the authority of the Air Tactics Development Wing. The squadron operates YS-11EB aircraft.
