= Air Phoenix =

Airline of Thailand (2007–2009)

IATA	ICAO	Call sign
-	APN	THAI AIR PHOENIX
- Founded: 2007
- Commenced operations: May 2008
- Ceased operations: 2009
- Operating bases: Don Mueang International Airport
- Fleet size: 2
- Destinations: 3
- Headquarters: Bangkok, Thailand
- Website: www.air-phoenix.com (defunct)

Air Phoenix was a short-lived airline based in Bangkok, Thailand operating out of Don Mueang International Airport.

== History ==
The airline was founded in 2007 and started operations in May 2008 with a flight between Bangkok and Mae Sot, which was later terminated. Air Phoenix was shut down in 2009.

== Destinations ==
At its height in May 2008, Air Phoenix operated scheduled flights to the following destinations:

- Bangkok (Don Mueang International Airport) (base)
- Chiang Mai (Chiang Mai International Airport)
- Chiang Rai (Chiang Rai International Airport)

== Fleet ==
In May 2008, Air Phoenix had operated the following aircraft:

- 1 NAMC YS-11
- 1 King Air B200 (used for charter services)
