= Aero Majestic Airways =

Philippine airline

IATA	ICAO	Call sign
—	AMA	—
- Founded: February 2010
- Hubs: Zamboanga International Airport (Zamboanga)
- Fleet size: 4
- Parent company: Aero Majestic Airways Inc.
- Headquarters: Parañaque, Philippines
- Website: https://aeromajestic.blogspot.com/

Aero Majestic Airways, Inc. is a Filipino passenger airline, air charter operator and aircraft maintenance provider based at Zamboanga International Airport in Zamboanga City, Philippines. It is the only Mindanao-based commercial airline operating in the Philippines.

== History ==
Aero Majestic Airways, Inc., was founded in February 2010, offering chartered and cargo flights between Zamboanga City and the cities of Cagayan de Oro and Dipolog. The airline operates as single YS-11 aircraft from its hub at Zamboanga International Airport. The inaugural flight took place on 19 September 2011, from Zamboanga City to Lumbia Airport in Cagayan de Oro. On 27 September 2011, the airline began chartered flights from Zamboanga to Dipolog and announced plans to offer flights to Pagadian, Zamboanga del Sur; Jolo, Sulu; and Bongao, Tawi-Tawi.

On 19 February 2012, the airline's director and vice president, Capt. Raheel Mohamed Ali Shaikh, was shot dead by unidentified men in motorcycles in Parañaque, Metro Manila.
