= China Airlines Flight 206 =

1970 aviation accident

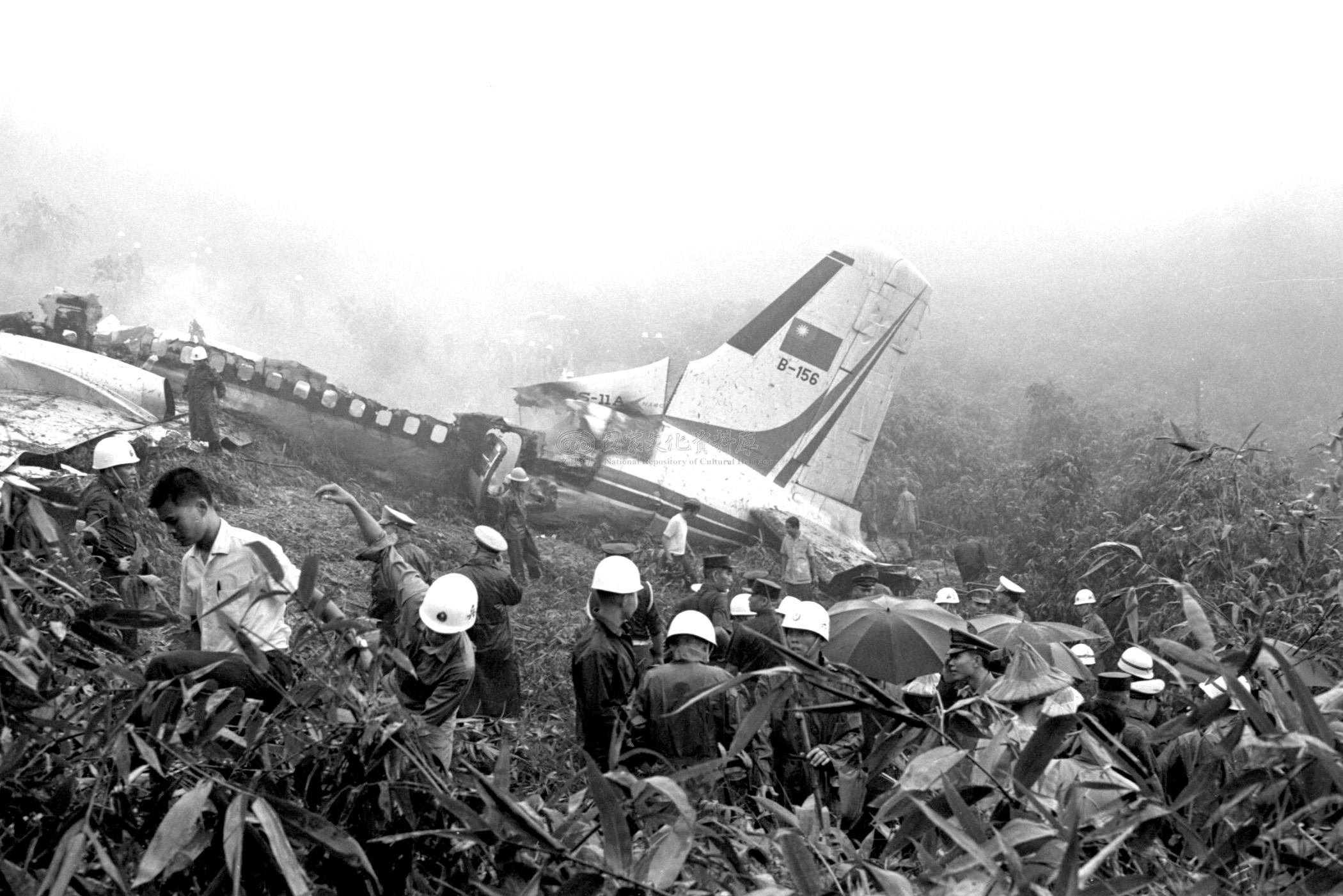
- The wreckage of B-156

Accident
- Date: 12 August 1970
- Summary: Controlled flight into terrain due to pilot error in poor visibility
- Site: Yuan Mountain, near Songshan Airport, Taipei, Taiwan; 25°5′28″N 121°32′13″E

Aircraft
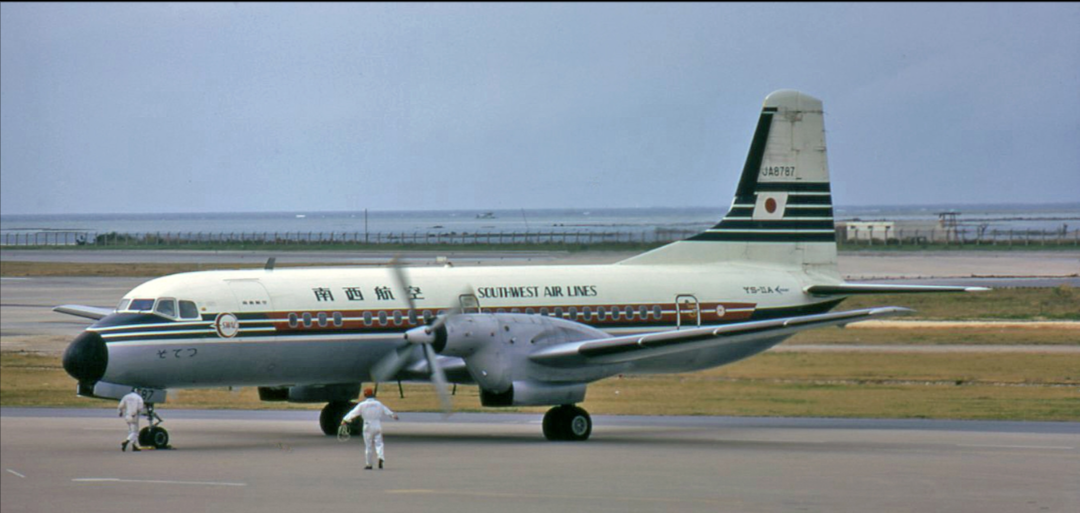
- A NAMC YS-11, similar to the aircraft involved
- Aircraft type: NAMC YS-11A-219
- Operator: China Airlines
- IATA flight No.: CI206
- ICAO flight No.: CAL206
- Call sign: DYNASTY 206
- Registration: B-156
- Flight origin: Hualien Airport, Hualien City, Taiwan
- Destination: Songshan Airport, Taipei, Taiwan
- Occupants: 31
- Passengers: 26
- Crew: 5
- Fatalities: 14
- Survivors: 17

China Airlines Flight 206 was a scheduled domestic passenger flight operated by a China Airlines NAMC YS-11, registered as B-156, that crashed on approach to Taipei Songshan Airport on 12 August 1970. While preparing to land, the aircraft entered into a severe thunderstorm with heavy fog. Whilst on final approach the plane crashed into a bamboo grove near the top of Yuan Mountain, killing 14 of the 31 people aboard.

== Background ==
=== Aircraft ===
The aircraft involved was a year old NAMC YS-11A-219 registered as B-156. It featured two Rolls-Royce Dart Mk.542-10K turboprop engines with the manufacturing number of 2110.
