= Ozuki Air Field =

Ozuki Air Field 小月飛行場
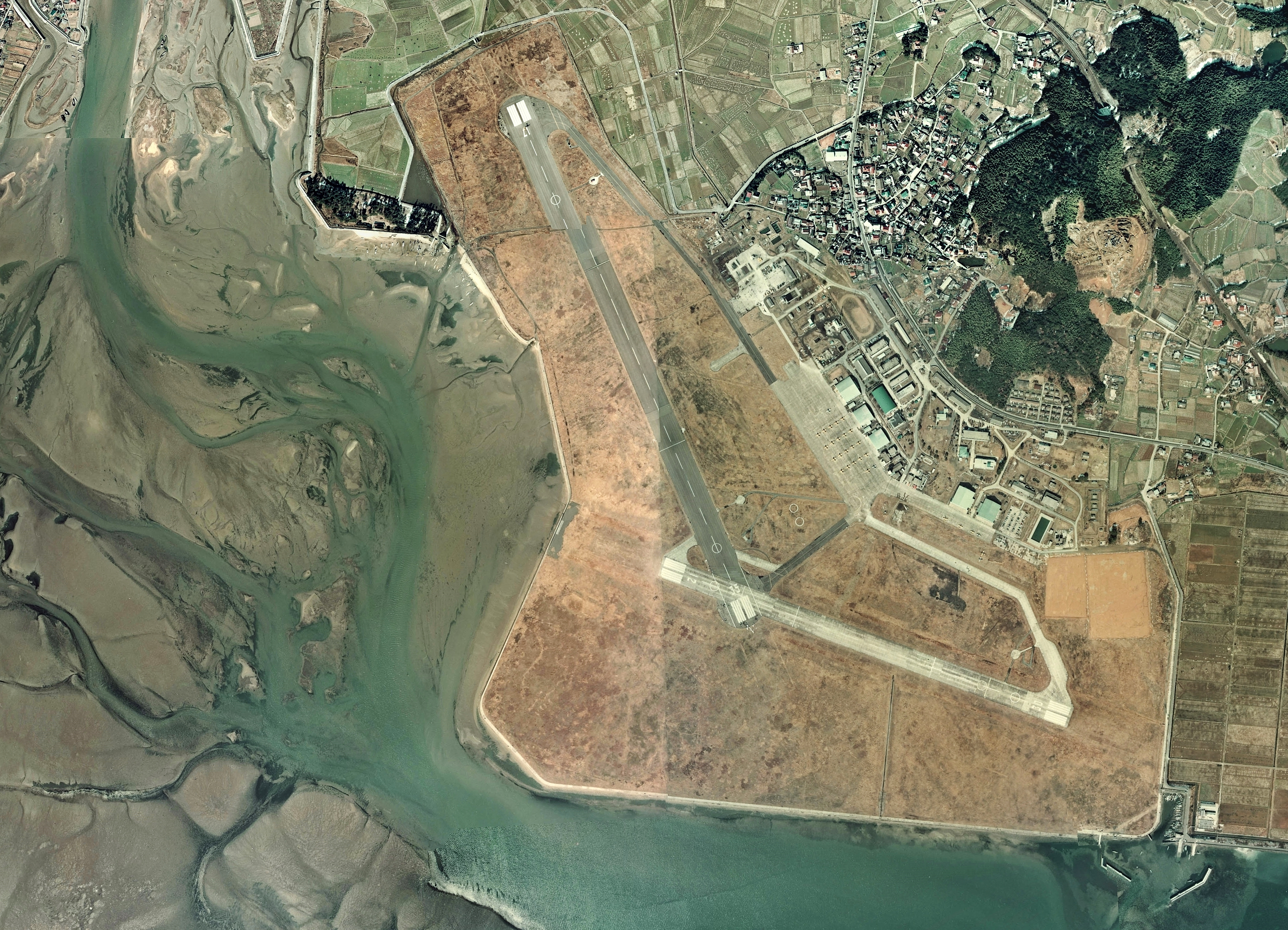
- IATA: none; ICAO: RJOZ

Summary
- Airport type: Military
- Operator: Japan Maritime Self-Defense Force
- Location: Shimonoseki, Japan
- Elevation AMSL: 13 ft / 4 m
- Coordinates: 34°02′49″N 131°03′08″E

Map
- Location in Japan

Runways
Direction	Length		Surface
Direction	m	ft	Surface
17/35	1,200	3,937	Asphalt concrete
12/30	900	2,953	Concrete
- Source: Japanese AIP at AIS Japan

Ozuki Air Field (小月飛行場, Ozuki Hikōjō) (ICAO: RJOZ) is a military aerodrome of the Japan Maritime Self-Defense Force Ozuki Air Base (小月航空基地, Ozuki Kōkū-Kichi). It is located in Shimonoseki, Yamaguchi Prefecture, Japan.

== Accidents and incidents ==
- 28 September 2009, Japanese Maritime Self Defense Force YS-11M-A serial number 9044 overran the runway upon landing and was substantially damaged.
