= Olympic Airways Flight 506 =

1972 aviation accident in Greece

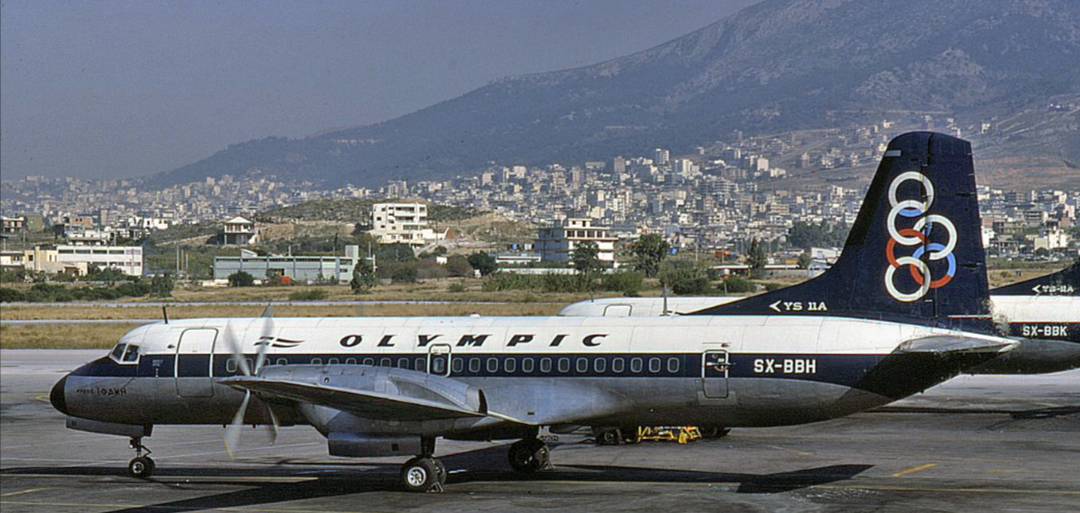
- An Olympic Airways YS-11, similar to the aircraft involved

Accident
- Date: 21 October 1972
- Summary: Crashed into the sea on approach
- Site: off Voula, Attica, Greece; 37°50′53.8″N 23°44′54.4″E

Aircraft
- Aircraft type: NAMC YS-11A
- Operator: Olympic Airways
- Registration: SX-BBQ
- Flight origin: Corfu International Airport, Corfu, Greece
- Destination: Ellinikon International Airport, Athens, Greece
- Occupants: 53
- Passengers: 49
- Crew: 4
- Fatalities: 37
- Survivors: 16

On 21 October 1972, Olympic Airways Flight 506, a NAMC YS-11 operating a domestic flight in Greece from Corfu International Airport, Corfu, to Ellinikon International Airport, Athens, crashed in the sea, about 250 m from the coast near the city of Voula, on approach to its destination. 37 of the 53 people on board were killed.

== Aircraft ==
The aircraft involved in the accident was a NAMC YS-11A registered as SX-BBQ, and manufactured in 1971. The captain was Patroklos Thomadakis.

== Accident ==
The aircraft, carrying 49 passengers and 4 crew members, took off from Corfu International Airport at 7:55 pm local time for its flight to Athens Airport. Landing in Athens was scheduled for 9:06 pm. Flight 506 encountered moderate turbulence and storms on its route to Athens. The storms made the tracking of the aircraft on radar difficult, so air traffic control asked flight 506 to descend to flight level FL150. When the plane was near Athens it lined up for landing on runway 33 of Ellinikon International Airport, but when it was over the sea about 5,5 km south of the airport it disappeared from radar. The air traffic controller then tried multiple times to contact flight 506, but received no answer. Other nearby flights were also contacted and asked to if they had the NAMC YS-11A in sight.

The impact with water created large fractures and holes in the fuselage of the aircraft. This let large quantities of water enter and flood the aircraft, which soon sank; many of the victimes died by drowning. One of the surviving passengers, N. Stefanou, managed to get out the sinking plane and swim to shore. He then reached the PIKPA hospital in Voula, asked for help and alerted rescue teams.

== Investigation ==
The final report on the accident was released on 9 January 1973. It established that pilot error was the main cause of the crash. It stated that the crew: didn't notice that some instruments, like the pressure altimeter, were giving incorrect and conflicting data; didn't follow the correct approach path to Ellinikon International Airport; didn't make a correct and gradual descent, but instead executed a descent that was too steep and too quick; didn't make correcting manoeuvers in time when the aircraft was low and about to impact the water; and didn't alert the passengers in time. Captain Patroklos Thomadakis, who survived the incident, was accused of involuntary manslaughter and involuntary personal injuries. He was acquitted when the trial ended in the summer of 1974.
