= Air Link International Airways =

Airline in the Philippines

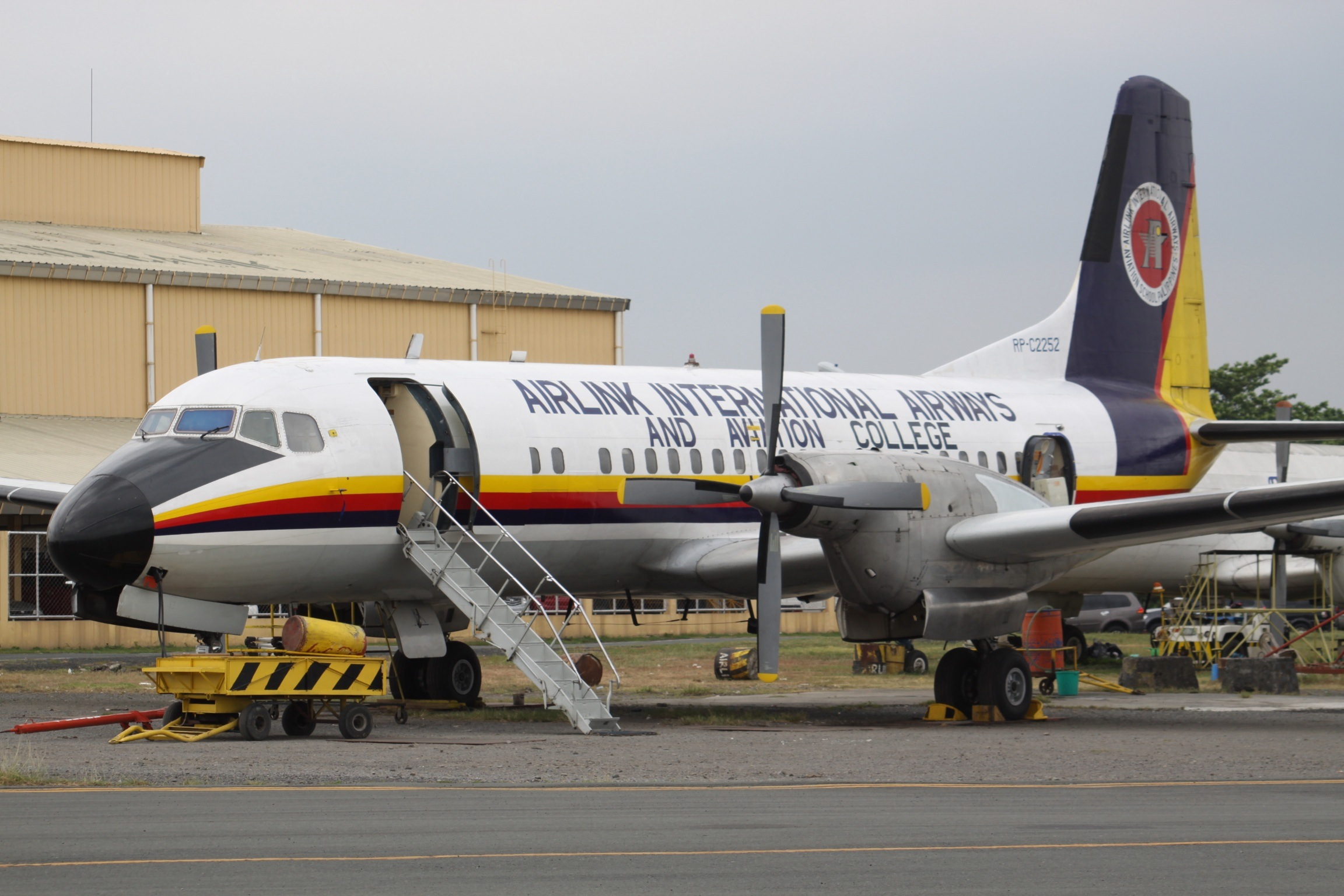
- Founded: 10 October 1982; 43 years ago
- Commenced operations: June 30, 1984; 42 years ago
- Hubs: Ninoy Aquino International Airport
- Fleet size: 1
- Headquarters: Airlink Bldg., Domestic Road, Pasay, Metro Manila, Philippines
- Employees: 201 to 500
- Website: https://aliac.edu.ph

Air Link International Airways is an airline based in Pasay, Metro Manila, Philippines. It operates charter services and a flying school. Its main base is Ninoy Aquino International Airport.

== History ==
The airline was established on 10 October 1982 and started operations on June 30, 1984.

== Fleet ==
The airline has one NAMC YS-11. The aircraft was substantially damaged in a landing accident in 2006.
