= Olympic Airways Flight 830 =

1976 aviation accident in Greece

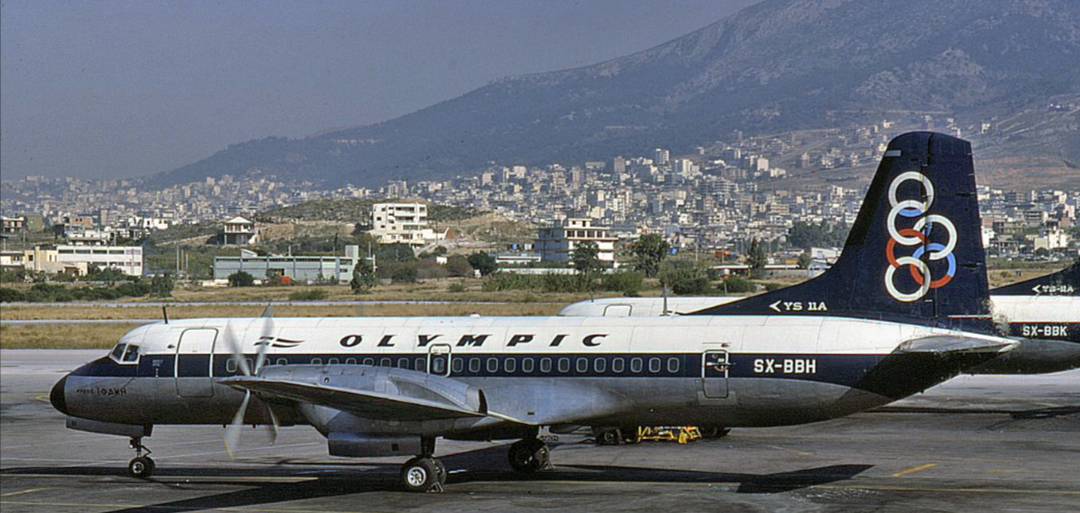
- An Olympic Airways YS-11, similar to the aircraft involved

Accident
- Date: 23 November 1976
- Summary: Controlled flight into terrain
- Site: Servia, Greece

Aircraft
- Aircraft type: NAMC YS-11A
- Aircraft name: Isle of Milos
- Operator: Olympic Airways
- Registration: SX-BBR
- Flight origin: Ellinikon International Airport, Athens, Greece
- Stopover: Larissa National Airport, Larisa, Greece
- Destination: Kozani National Airport, Kozani, Greece
- Occupants: 50
- Passengers: 46
- Crew: 4
- Fatalities: 50
- Survivors: 0

Olympic Airways Flight 830 was a domestic scheduled passenger flight in Greece from Athens to Kozani with a stop in Larisa. On 23 November 1976 it was being operated by a NAMC YS-11 turboprop airliner registered in Greece as SX-BBR when it collided at an altitude of 4,625 feet (1,410 m) with a mountain near Servia and crashed, killing all 50 on board.

== Accident ==
When the aircraft was unable to land at Larissa due to bad weather it elected to fly directly to Kozani at an altitude of 5500 ft. The last radio contact was at 09:45 when the pilot reported he was about 15 nm South of Kozani on a heading of 318 degrees, he was given the weather forecast. At 10:19 with nothing heard from the aircraft the airport declared an emergency and it was discovered that Flight 830 had flown into a mountain at a height of 4625 ft near the village of Servia, the mountains were covered in cloud.

== Investigation ==
Investigation showed that the aircraft was on a heading of 310 degrees when it first struck the ground, it disintegrated over the next 200 metres before becoming shortly airborne again, finally crashing at the foot of another hill. Fire had broken out after the initial impact and continued to burn for several hours destroying the aircraft. At the accident site the mountain above 3000 ft were covered in cloud.

== Aircraft ==
The aircraft was a twin-engined NAMC YS-11A turboprop airliner registered SX-BBR that first flew on 12 April 1971, and was delivered to Olympic Airways on 28 April 1971.
