= Showa Aircraft Industry =

- Native name: 昭和飛行機工業株式会社
- Romanized name: Shōwa Hikōki Kōgyō Kabushiki-gaisha
- Type: KK
- Traded as: TYO: 7404
- Industry: Aircraft manufacturing
- Founded: June 5, 1937; 89 years ago
- Website: www.showa-aircraft.co.jp

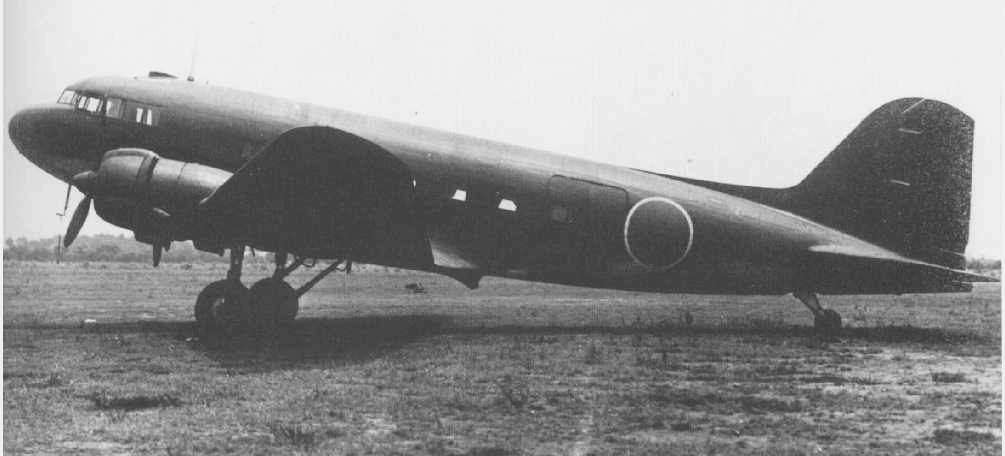
Showa L2D

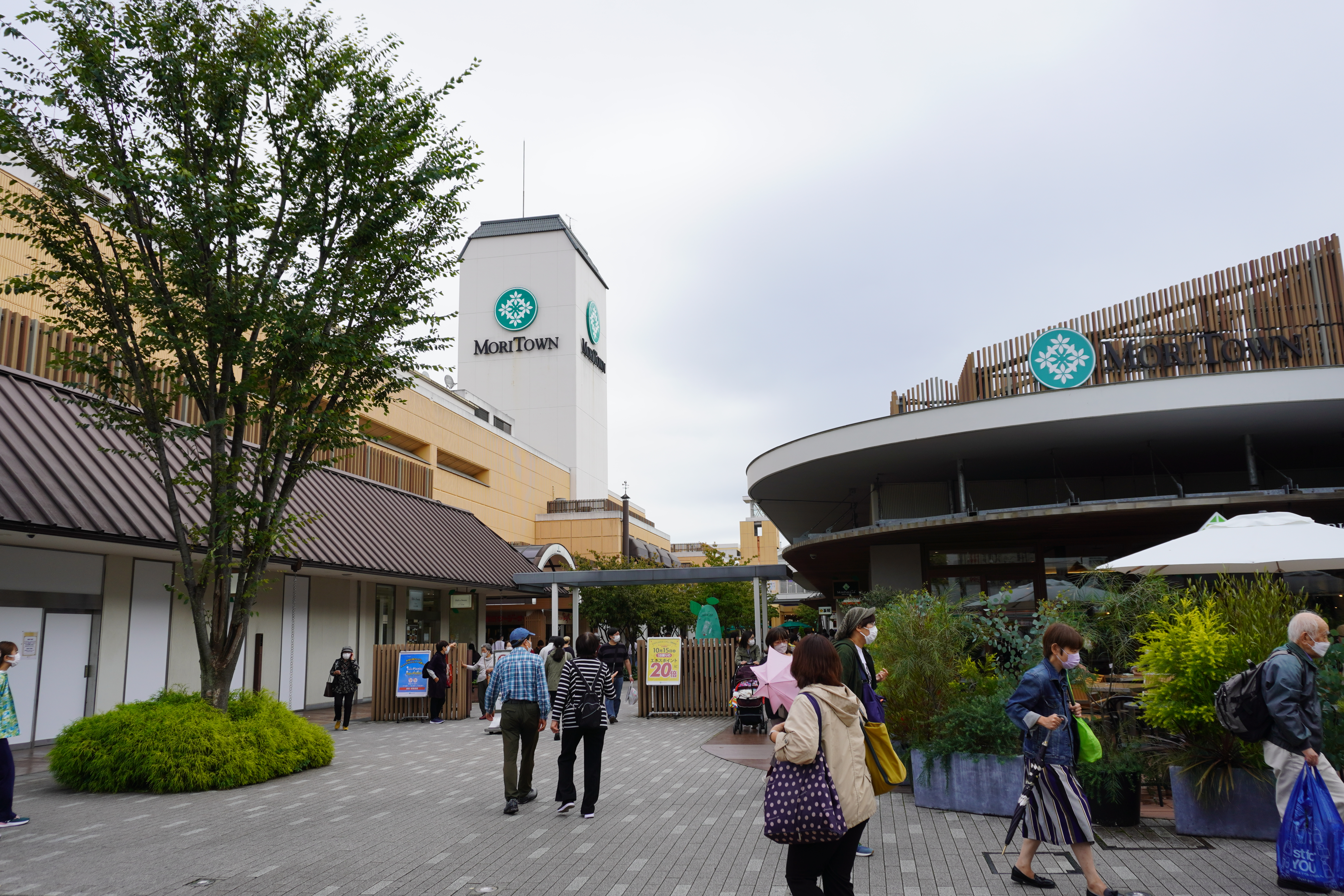
MORITOWN, a shopping mall in Akishima founded by the company on its former factory ground

Showa Aircraft Industry Co., Ltd. (昭和飛行機工業株式会社, Shōwa Hikōki Kōgyō Kabushiki-gaisha) is a Japanese company. Its headquarters are at Akishima-shi, Tokyo Prefecture, a region of Tokyo Metropolis. It was established in 1937 as a manufacturer of military aircraft in Akishima-shi. In World War II it was one of two companies manufacturing the Showa/Nakajima L2D, a license-built Douglas DC-3 variant. It also manufactured other military aircraft. Since the 1950s the company began to manufacture specialized freight trucks such as tank trucks and grain hopper trailers.

Honeycomb panels manufactured by Showa Aircraft Industry has been used on a number of spacecraft including the Hayabusa asteroid sample return mission, the joint NASA-JAXA GPM Core Observatory satellite, and the H-II Transfer Vehicle.
