= List of defunct airlines of Japan =

This is a list of defunct airlines of Japan.

Airline	Japanese name	Image	IATA	ICAO	Callsign	Founded	Ceased operations	Notes
Air Central	エアーセントラル		NV	CRF	AIR CENTRAL	1988	2010	Merged with Air Next and Air Nippon Network to form ANA Wings
Air Hokkaido	エアー北海道			ADK	AIR DREAM	1994	2006	
Air Next	エアーネクスト		7A	NXA	BLUE DOLPHIN	2004	2010	Merged with Air Central and Air Nippon Network to form ANA Wings
Air Nippon	エアーニッポン		EL	ANK	ANK AIR	1987	2012	Merged into All Nippon Airways
Air Nippon Network	エアーニッポンネットワーク		EH	AKX	ALPHA WING	2002	2010	Merged with Air Central and Air Next to form ANA Wings
AirAsia Japan (Part 1)	エアアジア・ジャパン		DJ	WAJ	WING ASIA	2011	2013	Rebranded as Vanilla Air
AirAsia Japan (Part 2)	エアアジア・ジャパン		DJ	WAJ	WING ASIA	2017	2020	Shut down due to effects of the COVID-19 pandemic
AirJapan	エアージャパン		NQ	AJX	AIR JAPAN	2022	2026	AirJapan brand retired, with all services integrated into parent company, All Nippon Airways
ANA & JP Express	ANA & JP エクスプレス		9N	AJV	AYJAY CARGO	2006	2010	Merged into Air Japan
Fuji Air Lines	富士航空					1952	1964	Merged with Nitto Airlines and North Japan Airlines to form Japan Domestic Airlines
Fujita Airlines	藤田航空					1956	1963	Merged into All Nippon Airways
Galaxy Airlines	ギャラクシーエアラインズ		J7	GXY	GALAX	2005	2008	
Harlequin Air	ハーレクィンエア		JH	HLQ	HARLEQUIN	1997	2005	Affiliate of Japan Air System, now part of Japan Airlines
Imperial Japanese Airways	大日本航空					1938	1945	
Japan Airlines Domestic	日本航空ジャパン		JL	JFL	J-BIRD	2004	2006	Merged into Japan Airlines
Japan Asia Airways	日本アジア航空		EG	JAA	ASIA	1975	2008	Merged into Japan Airlines
Japan Domestic Airlines	日本国内航空					1964	1971	Merged with Toa Airways to form Toa Domestic Airlines
JAL Cargo (Part 1)	JALカーゴ		JL	JAL	JAPAN AIR	1982	2010	
JAL Express	JALエクスプレス		JC	JEX	JANEX	1997	2014	Integrated into Japan Airlines
JALways	JALウェイズ		JO	JAZ	JALWAYS	1991	2010	Merged into Japan Airlines
Japan Air System	日本エアシステム		JD	JAS	AIR SYSTEM	1988	2004	Rebranded as Japan Airlines Domestic
Japan Air Transport	日本航空運送					1928	1938	Merged into Imperial Japanese Airways
Japan Universal System Transport	日本ユニバーサル航空		YU	JST		1991	1996	
Kyokushin Air	旭伸航空			KOK	KYOKUSHIN AIR	1968	2008	
Link Airs	リンク					2012	2014	Went bankrupt and never launched
Nakanihon Airlines	中日本エアラインサービス					1998	2005	Commuter division of Nakanihon Air Service, rebranded as Air Central
Nitto Airlines	日東航空					1955	1964	Merged with Fuji Air Lines and North Japan Airlines to form Japan Domestic Airlines
North Japan Airlines	北日本航空					1962	1964	Merged with Fuji Air Lines and Nitto Airlines to form Japan Domestic Airlines
Orange Cargo	オレンジカーゴ			ORJ	ORANGE CARGO	2002	2004	Went bankrupt
Skynet Asia Airways	スカイネットアジア航空		LQ	SNJ	NEW SKY	1997	2011	Rebranded as Solaseed Air
Southwest Air Lines	南西航空		NU	SWL	NANSEI	1967	1993	Rebranded as Japan Transocean Air
Toa Airways	東亜航空			TAW	TOA DOMES	1953	1971	Merged with Japan Domestic Airlines to form Toa Domestic Airlines
Toa Domestic Airlines	東亜国内航空		JD	TDA	TOA DOMES	1971	1988	Rebranded as Japan Air System
Vanilla Air	バニラ・エア		JW	VNL	VANILLA	2013	2019	Merged into Peach Aviation

== See also ==
- List of airlines of Japan
- List of airports in Japan
