= List of airlines of Japan =

This is a list of airlines currently operating in Japan.

Passenger airlines of Japan

== Scheduled airlines ==
=== Domestic and international ===
Airline	Image	IATA	ICAO	Callsign	Commenced operations	Alliance
Air Japan		NQ	AJX	AIR JAPAN	2024 [Ceased Operations]	
All Nippon Airways		NH	ANA	ALL NIPPON	1952	StarAlliance
Japan Airlines		JL	JAL	JAPAN AIR	1951	OneWorld
Jetstar Japan		GK	JJP	ORANGE LINER	2012	
Peach Aviation		MM	APJ	AIR PEACH	2012	
Spring Japan		IJ	SJO	J-SPRING	2014	
StarFlyer		7G	SFJ	STARFLYER	2006	
ZIPAIR Tokyo		ZG	TZP	ZIPPY	2020	

=== Domestic only ===
Airline	Image	IATA	ICAO	Callsign	Commenced operations
Air Do		HD	ADO	AIR DO	1998
Amakusa Airlines		MZ	AHX	AMAKUSA AIR	2000
ANA Wings		NH/EH	ANA/AKX	ALL NIPPON	2010
Fuji Dream Airlines		JH	FDA	FUJI DREAM	2009
Hokkaido Air System		JL/6L	JAL/NTH	NORTH AIR	1998
Ibex Airlines		FW	IBX	IBEX	2004
J-Air		JL/XM	JAL/JLJ	JAPAN AIR	1996
Japan Air Commuter		JL/JC	JAL/JAC	COMMUTER	1983
Japan Transocean Air		NU	JTA	J-OCEAN	1993
New Central Airservice			CUK	CHUOH AIR	1978
New Japan Aviation			NJA	SHIN NIHON	1969
Oriental Air Bridge		OC	ORC	ORIENTAL BRIDGE	2001
Ryukyu Air Commuter		NU	RAC	RYUKYU	1985
Skymark Airlines		BC	SKY	SKYMARK	1998
Solaseed Air		6J	SNJ	NEW SKY	2011
Toki Air		BV	TOK	TOKI AIR	2024

== Cargo ==
Airline	Image	IATA	ICAO	Callsign	Commenced operations
ANA Cargo		NH	ANA	ALL NIPPON	2013
JAL Cargo		JL	JAL	JAPAN AIR	1982 (2024)
Nippon Cargo Airlines		KZ	NCA	NIPPON CARGO	1985

== See also ==
- List of defunct airlines of Japan
- List of airports in Japan
- List of airlines
