= Hanamaki Airport =

Airport in Hanamaki, Iwate Prefecture, Japan

Iwate Hanamaki Airport いわて花巻空港
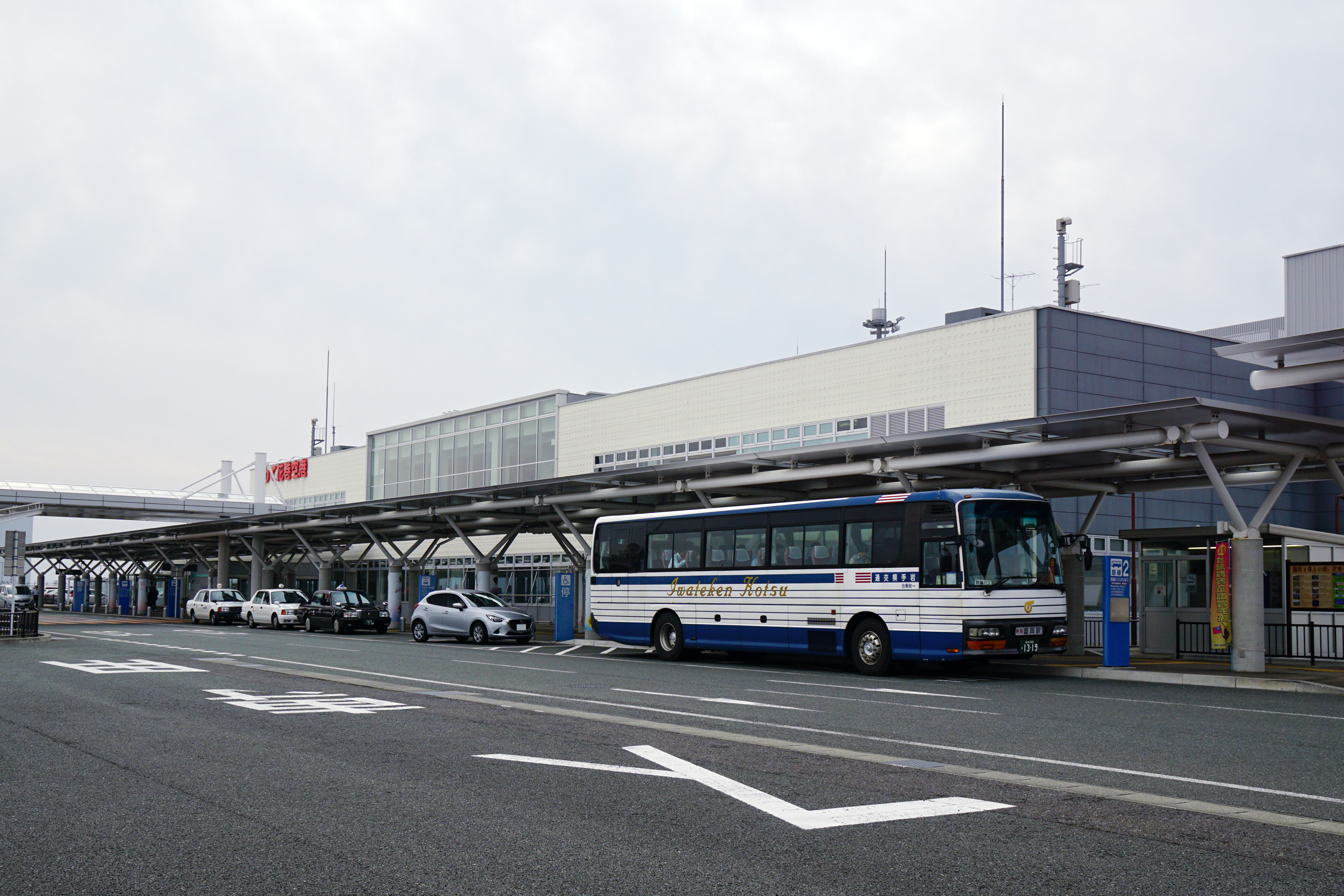
- IATA: HNA; ICAO: RJSI; WMO: 47549

Summary
- Airport type: Public (Type-3)
- Owner: Iwate Prefecture
- Serves: Hanamaki and Morioka
- Location: Hanamaki, Iwate Prefecture, Japan
- Opened: 1964; 62 years ago
- Elevation AMSL: 294 ft (90 m)
- Coordinates: 39°25′43″N 141°08′07″E

Map
- Location in Japan HNA/RJSI (Japan)

Runways
Direction	Length		Surface
Direction	m	ft	Surface
02/20	2,500	8,202	Asphalt concrete

Statistics (2015)
- Passengers: 395,647
- Cargo (metric tonnes): 150
- Aircraft movement: 11,326
- Source: Japanese Ministry of Land, Infrastructure, Transport and Tourism

Iwate Hanamaki Airport (いわて花巻空港, Iwate Hanamaki Kūkō) or Hanamaki Airport (IATA: HNA, ICAO: RJSI) is an airport located 6 km (3.7 mi) north-northeast of the center of Hanamaki, Iwate Prefecture, Japan.

== History ==
Hanamaki Airport first opened in 1964 with a 1,200-meter runway. It was later extended to 2,000 meters in 1983 allowing jet service to operate from the airport. On 4 April 2009, a new terminal building was opened on the opposite side of the runway, replacing the now-defunct old terminal building that is situated next to Route 4. Due to this change, Nitanai Station became the nearest train station to the terminal building; however, there is no bus or taxi service at that station, and Hanamaki Airport Station remains the most convenient for access.

== Airlines and destinations ==
Airlines	Destinations
Fuji Dream Airlines	Fukuoka, Kobe, Nagoya–Komaki
J-Air	Osaka–Itami, Sapporo–Chitose
Tigerair Taiwan	Taipei–Taoyuan

== Accidents and incidents ==
- April 18, 1993, Japan Air System Flight 451: A Douglas DC-9-41 of Japan Air System, flying from Nagoya to Hanamaki, crashed after the aircraft, caught by wind shear, skidded off of the runway while landing at Hanamaki Airport. All of the passengers and crew survived.
