= HLQ =

HLQ may refer to:

- Huntington Library Quarterly, an official publication of the Huntington Library
- HLQ, the ICAO code for Harlequin Air, a defunct airline in Fukuoka, Japan
