= ORJ =

ORJ may refer to:

- ORJ, the IATA code for Orinduik Airport, Potaro-Siparuni, Guyana
- ORJ, the ICAO code for Orange Cargo, a defunct Japanese freight-only airline
