= Sado Airport =

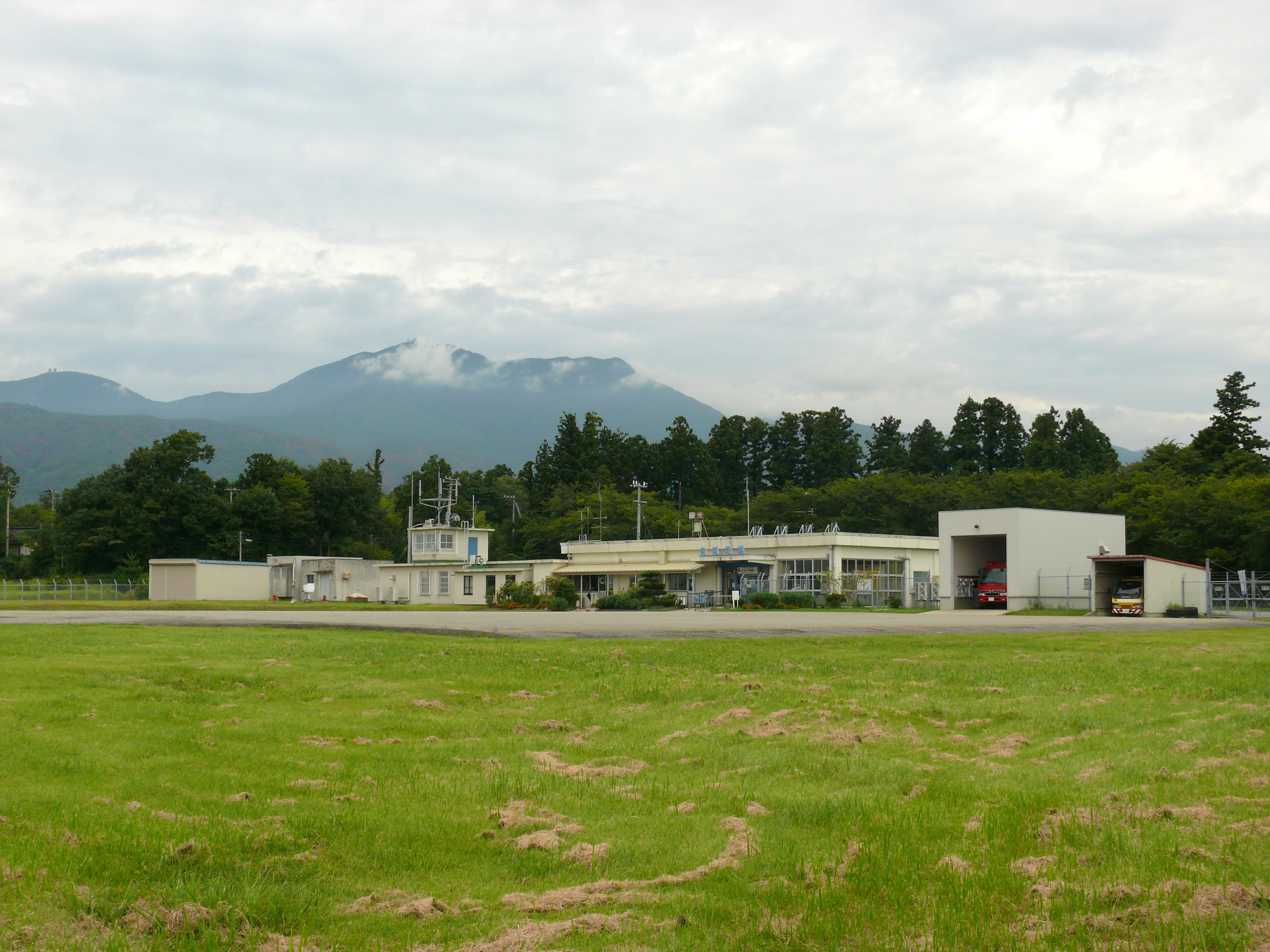
- IATA: SDS; ICAO: RJSD

Summary
- Airport type: Public
- Operator: Niigata Prefecture
- Location: Sado, Japan
- Elevation AMSL: 75 ft (23 m)
- Coordinates: 38°03′40″N 138°24′51″E

Map
- Location in Japan RJSD (Japan)

Runways
Direction	Length		Surface
Direction	m	ft	Surface
10/28	890	2,920	Asphalt concrete

Statistics (2015)
- Passengers: 62
- Cargo (metric tonnes): 0
- Aircraft movement: 1,190
- Source: Japanese AIP at AIS Japan; Japanese Ministry of Land, Infrastructure, Transport and Tourism

Sado Airport (Japanese: 佐渡空港) (IATA: SDS, ICAO: RJSD) is a public aerodrome located in Sado, Niigata Prefecture, Japan.

== History ==
The airport opened in 1959 as a landing field (場外離着陸場) to provide air service connecting Sado Island to Niigata Airport, and was expanded in 1971 to allow more extensive general aviation service. Service to and from Sado Airport has been indefinitely suspended since April 2014. New Japan Aviation provided scheduled service until the airport's closure, although other scheduled operators have served the airport in the past. Kyokushin Air operated the Sado-Niigata route until September 2008.

The "Sado New Air Route Promotion Council" (Est.1985) has expressed an interest and advocated for extending the runway at Sado Airport to 2,000 meters. This extension is aimed at accommodating jet service and expanding flight destinations, including Tokyo-Haneda and Osaka-Itami. However, as of yet, no concrete plans for the expansion of the runway have been made by the prefecture.

Sado Airport started upgrading its facilities in November 2022 to accommodate larger aircraft. These upgrades include enhancements to the runway surface, taxiways, and terminal areas to better handle increased passenger traffic and the operational demands of larger aircraft. These enhancements are directly related to the Japanese low-cost airline, Toki Air, at the time expressing interest into establishing routes to Sado Airport.

Toki Air was exploring options to connect Sado to Niigata Airport and Tokyo Narita. These services, would mark the first scheduled flights to Sado since April 2014, when New Japan Aviation ceased operations. The inaugural route was expected to be Sado–Narita, commencing in the 2025 summer season.

However, Sado Airport's 890-meter runway presents challenges for Toki Air's ATR 42-600 fleet, which lacks the enhanced short-field performance of the (now) cancelled ATR 42-600S STOL variant. Despite these hurdles, Toki Air remained committed to launching routes to the island. Although expected to start a more optimistic route to Niigata or Kobe Airport as opposed to the initial suggested Tokyo Narita.

Training and preparations for the new route finally commenced around July 2025 with designated simulator training for the airport approach being done in a training facility in Taiwan. Then later on September 9th, Toki Air conducted training flights to and from Sado Airport, performing multiple landings and take-offs in order to train and verify arrival routes and the airports surroundings. Further familiarisation flights to Sado were conducted on the 19th of May 2026 in preparation for passenger flights later that month. Then finally on Thursday the 28th of May 2026, the first charter flight of Toki Air, originating from Kobe, touched down at Sado Airport marking the first passenger service to the island in 12 years.

This first flight was only available to Kansai travel agency personnel with tickets not being made available to the general public. Based on the outcome of this initial flight with passengers, Toki Air is planning to operate regular public charter flights to Sado Island in cooperation with travel agencies, in the fall of 2026.

== Airlines and destinations ==
Toki Air is expected to operate charter flights to Sado in cooperation with travel agencies in the fall of 2026, with Kobe Airport and Chubu Centrair International Airport being frontrunners as possible destinations.
