= Kyokushin Air =

IATA	ICAO	Call sign
-	KOK	-
- Ceased operations: October 1, 2008
- Operating bases: Sado Airport
- Fleet size: Britten-Norman Islander
- Destinations: Niigata Airport
- Headquarters: Sado Island, Japan

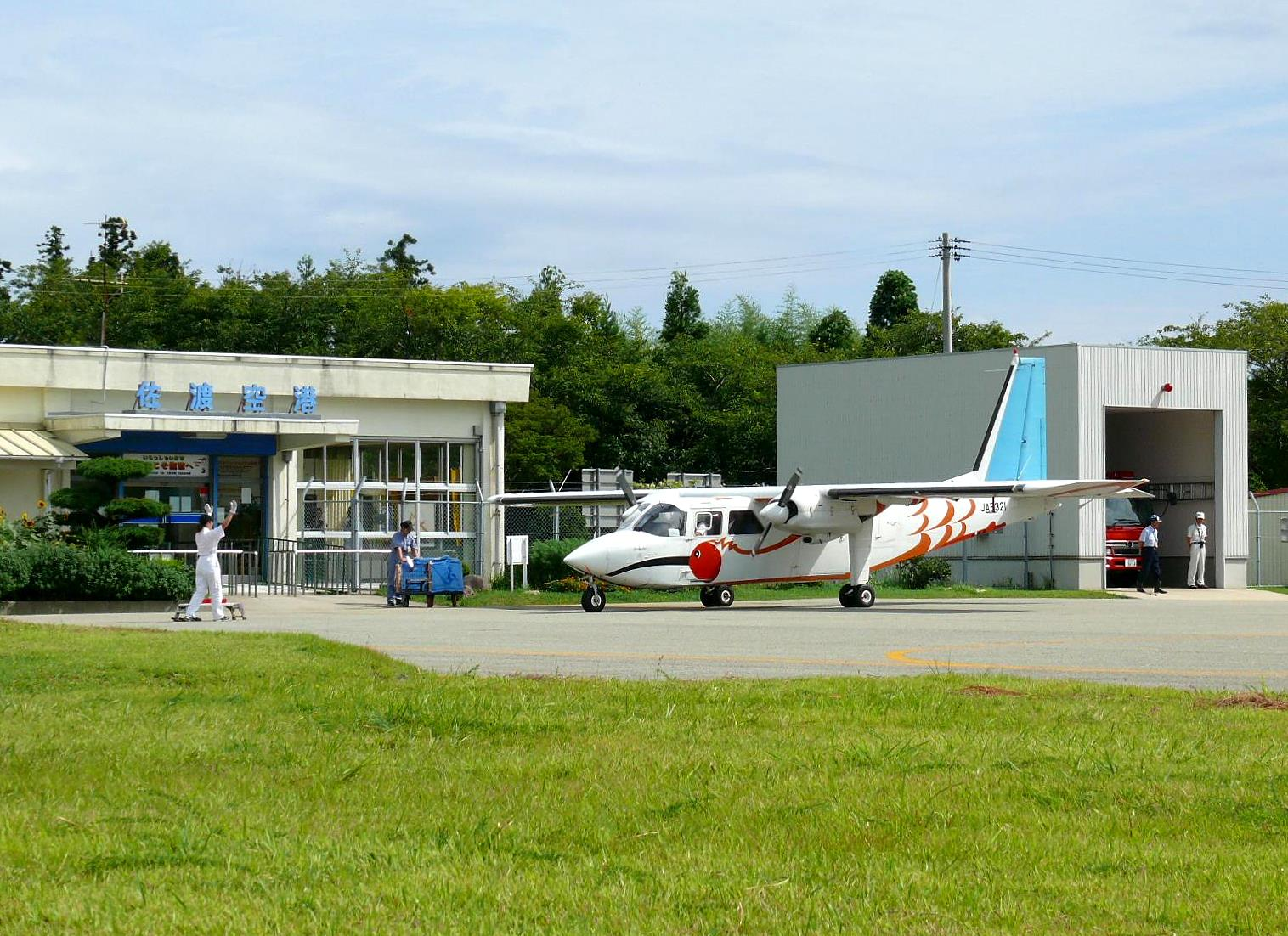
Britten Norman Islander

Kyokushin Air (旭伸航空, Kyokushin Kōkū) was a commuter airline serving visitors and residents of Sado Island, Niigata Prefecture, Japan. It commuted between Sado Island and Niigata Airport. The airline used Britten-Norman BN2 Islander aircraft for its services.

The airline ceased operations on October 1, 2008, due to financial difficulties.
