= Satsuma Iōjima Airport =

Airport located in Kagoshima, Japan

Mishimamura Satsuma Iōjima Airport
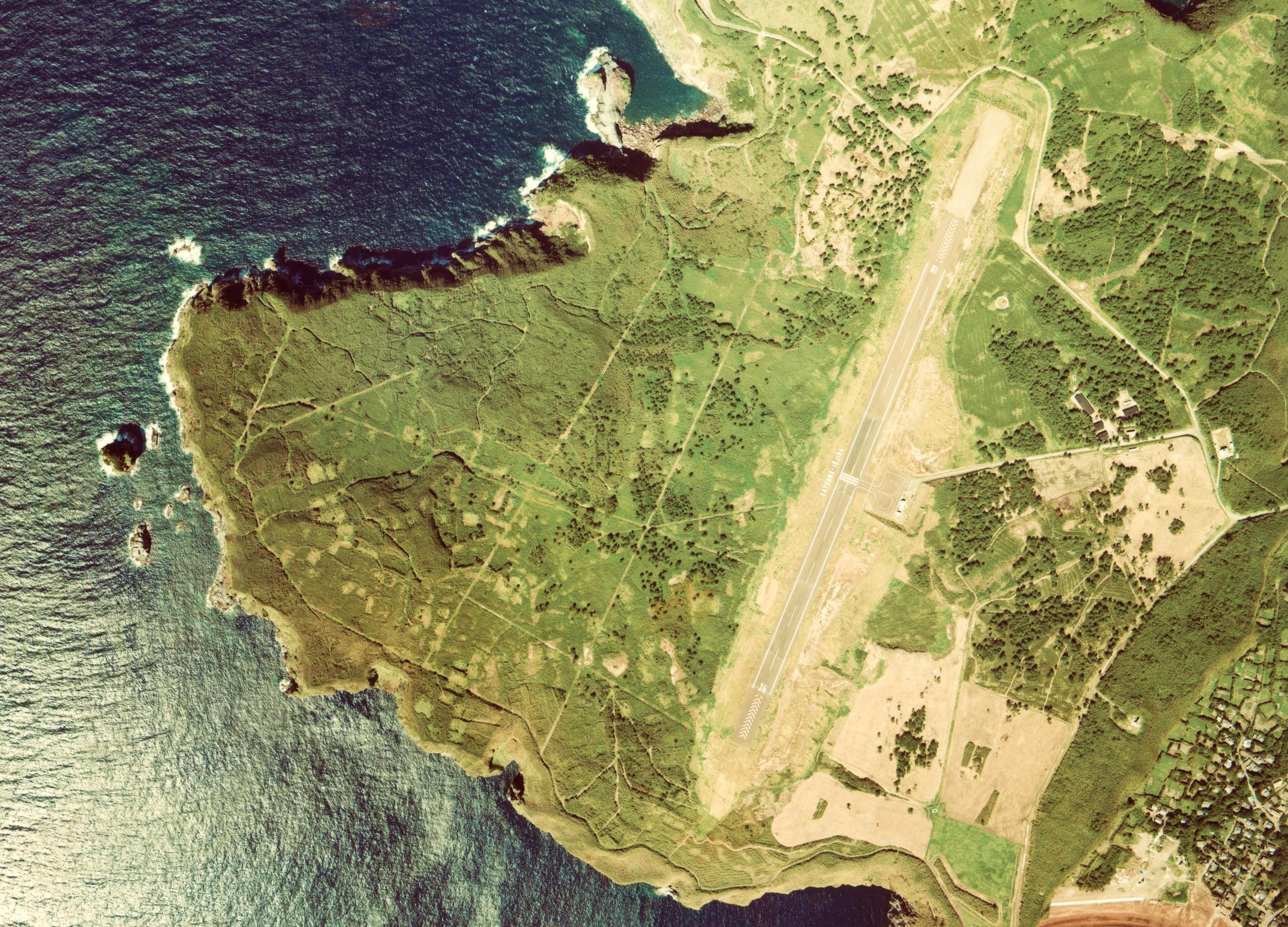
- Aerial view of the airport
- IATA: none; ICAO: none

Summary
- Airport type: Private
- Serves: Iōjima
- Location: Mishima, Kagoshima
- Time zone: Japan Standard Time (UTC+09:00)
- Elevation AMSL: 338 ft / 103 m
- Coordinates: 30.7845°N 130.2711°E

Map

Runways
Direction	Length		Surface
Direction	m	ft	Surface
18/36	600	1,969	Asphalt

Mishimamura Satsuma Iōjima Airport (三島村薩摩硫黄島飛行場, Mishimamura-Satsuma-Iōjima-Hikōjō) is a private airfield located on Iōjima, an island within Mishima, Kagoshima, Japan.

== History ==
The airfield was built in 1973 by the Yamaha Corporation as a way to transport customers to its resort on the island. The resort closed in 1982, and the airfield was transferred to the Mishima town government in 1994.

New Japan Aviation operates the only passenger service at this airport. The flight to Kagoshima are flown on Mondays and Wednesdays if enough passengers fly, and citizens of Iōjima are eligible for a discount. The flight takes 50 minutes and are flown with a Cessna 172.

Between 1972 and 1983, Nippon Naigai Airways operated flights to Kagoshima and Yakushima. Towa Airlines also operated flights to Makurazaki Airport.

== Airlines and destinations ==
Airlines	Destinations
New Japan Aviation	Charter: Kagoshima

== Incidents ==
- On November 6, 1997, a Towa Airlines Cessna 172 bound for Makurazaki crash landed shortly after takeoff. It was determined that a passenger pushed the center stick downwards, causing the plane to crash. Although the plane was wrecked, there were no casualties.
- On November 25, 2012, a privately owned Fuji FA-200 Aero Subaru overran the runway on landing, hitting a bamboo fence. Among the 4 people aboard, there were no casualties.
