= Toa Airways =

Airline of Japan (1953–1971)

Toa Airways 東亜航空株式会社 Tōa Kōkū Kabushiki-gaisha
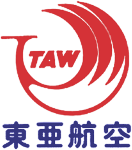
IATA	ICAO	Call sign
—	TAW	TOA DOMES
- Founded: November 30, 1953
- Ceased operations: May 15, 1971 (merged with Japan Domestic Airlines to form Toa Domestic Airlines)
- Hubs: Hiroshima–Nishi Airport
- Headquarters: Hiroshima, Japan

Toa Airways was a Japanese airline and the predecessor of Japan Air System. Founded on November 30, 1953, it merged with Japan Domestic Airlines on May 15, 1971, to form Toa Domestic Airlines, which went on to become Japan Air System.

== Fleet ==
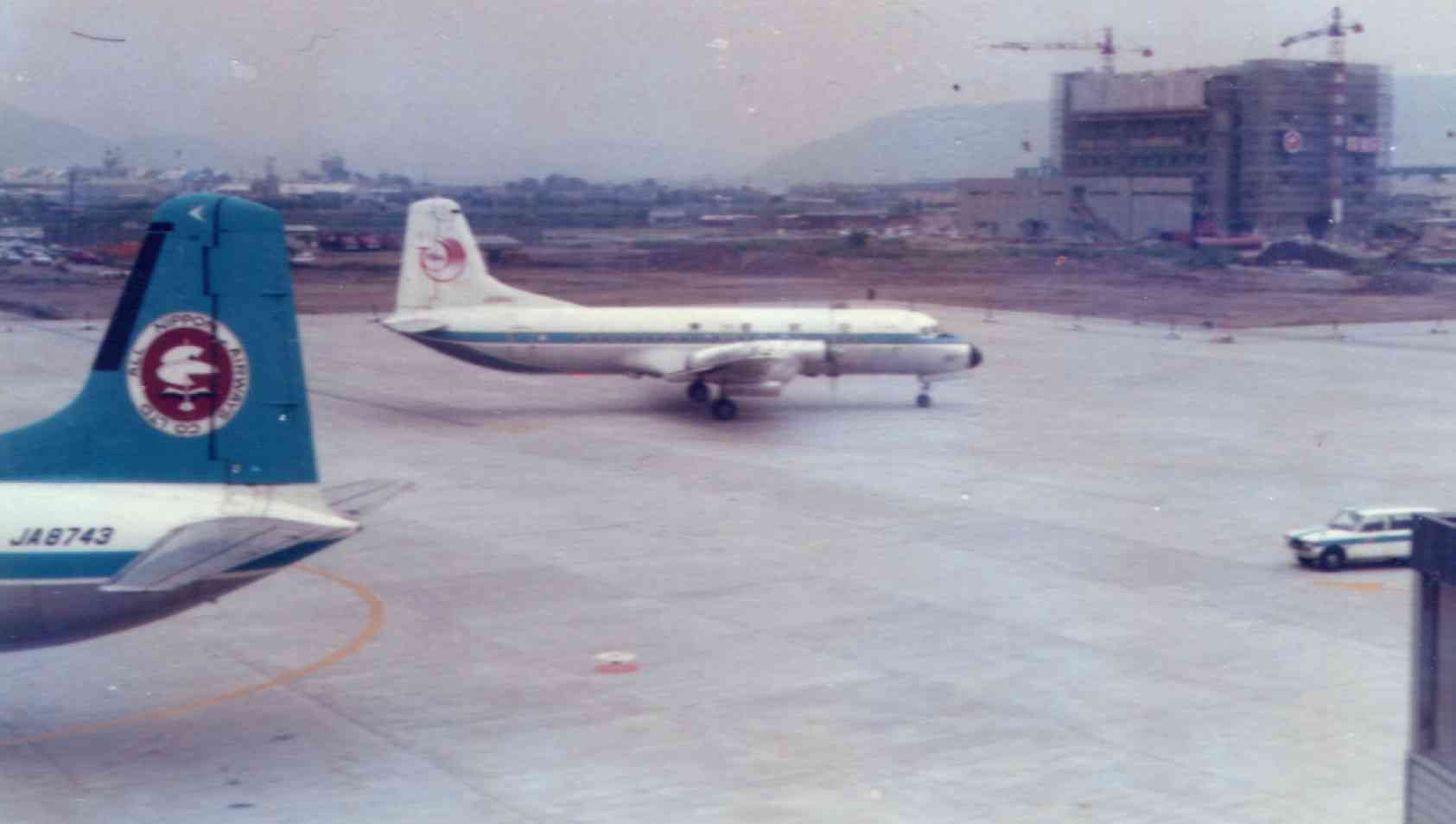
A Toa Airways NAMC YS-11 at Osaka International Airport, Japan in 1971.

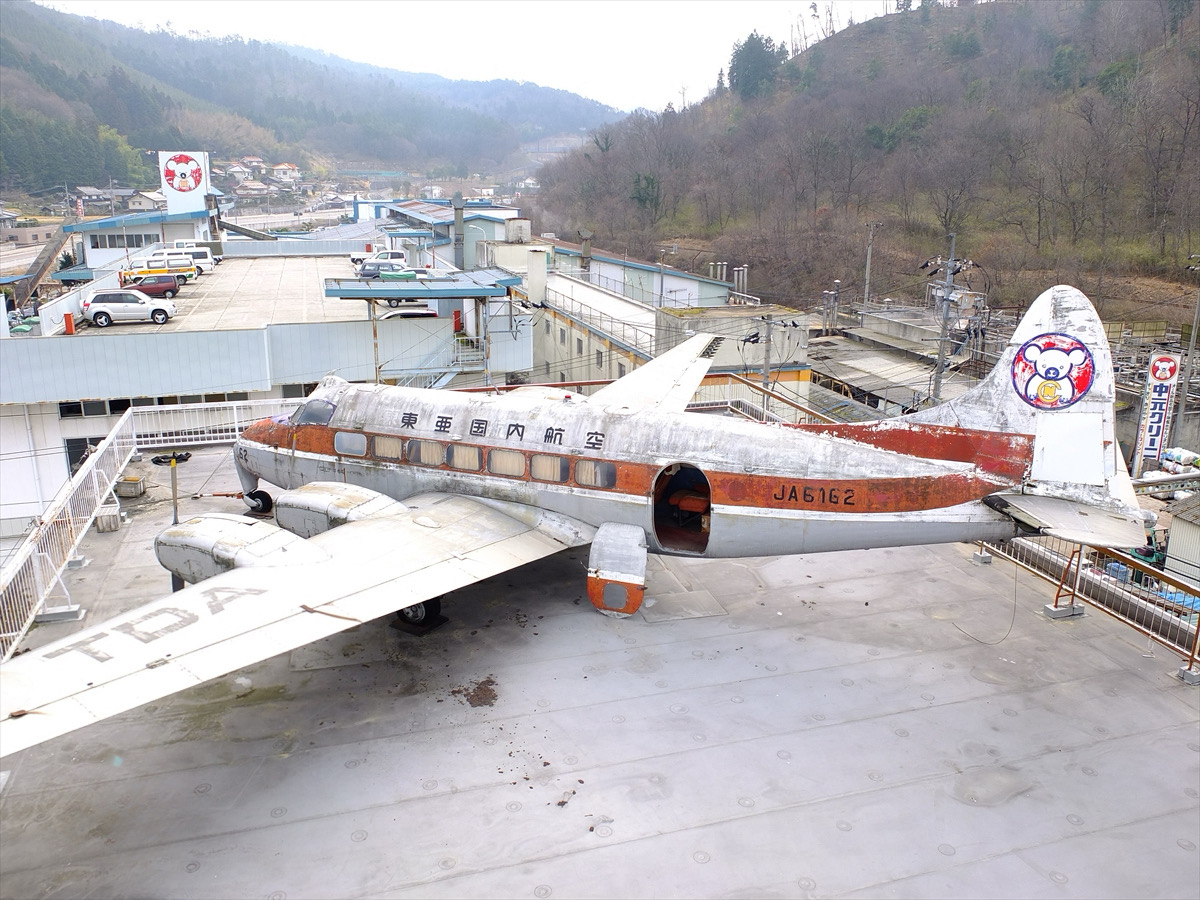
former Toa Airways DH114 preserved in Hiroshima as an advertising sign

During operations, Toa Airways operated the following aircraft types:

- de Havilland Dove
- de Havilland Heron
- Convair CV-240 family
- Beechcraft Model 18
- Beechcraft Twin Bonanza
- NAMC YS-11
- Cessna 170

== Accidents and incidents ==
- Flight 63- A NAMC YS-11A-217 crashed en route from Chitose Airport near Sapporo, Japan to Hakodate Airport. After arriving in Hakodate airspace, the plane was descending below 1800 meters when it crashed into the south face of Yokotsudake (Yokotsu Mountain). All 64 passengers and four crew on board perished. The cause of the crash was determined to be pilot error that followed strong winds pushing the plane off course.
