= New Japan Aviation =

Japanese aviation services company

New Japan Aviation 新日本航空 Shin Nihon Kōkū
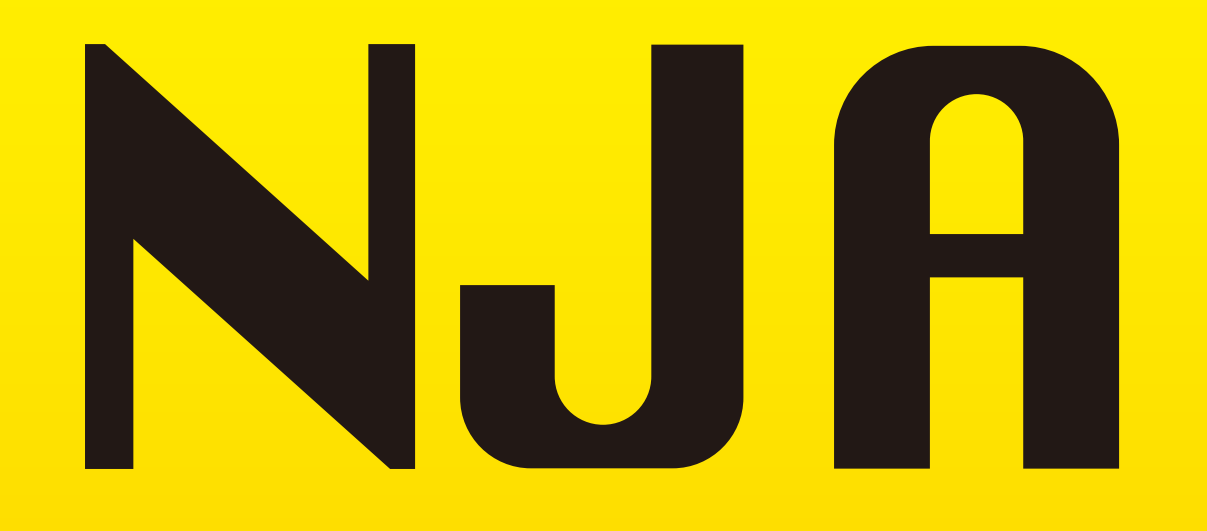
IATA	ICAO	Call sign
--	NJA	SHIN NIHON
- Founded: July 1969
- Fleet size: 5
- Destinations: 2
- Headquarters: Kagoshima Airport, Japan
- Website: newj.co.jp

New Japan Aviation (新日本航空, Shin Nihon Kōkū), also known as Shinnikkō (新日航) or NJA, is a Japanese aviation services company that operates scheduled air service between Niigata and Sado Island, as well as flight training and other services from its headquarters at Kagoshima Airport.

== History ==
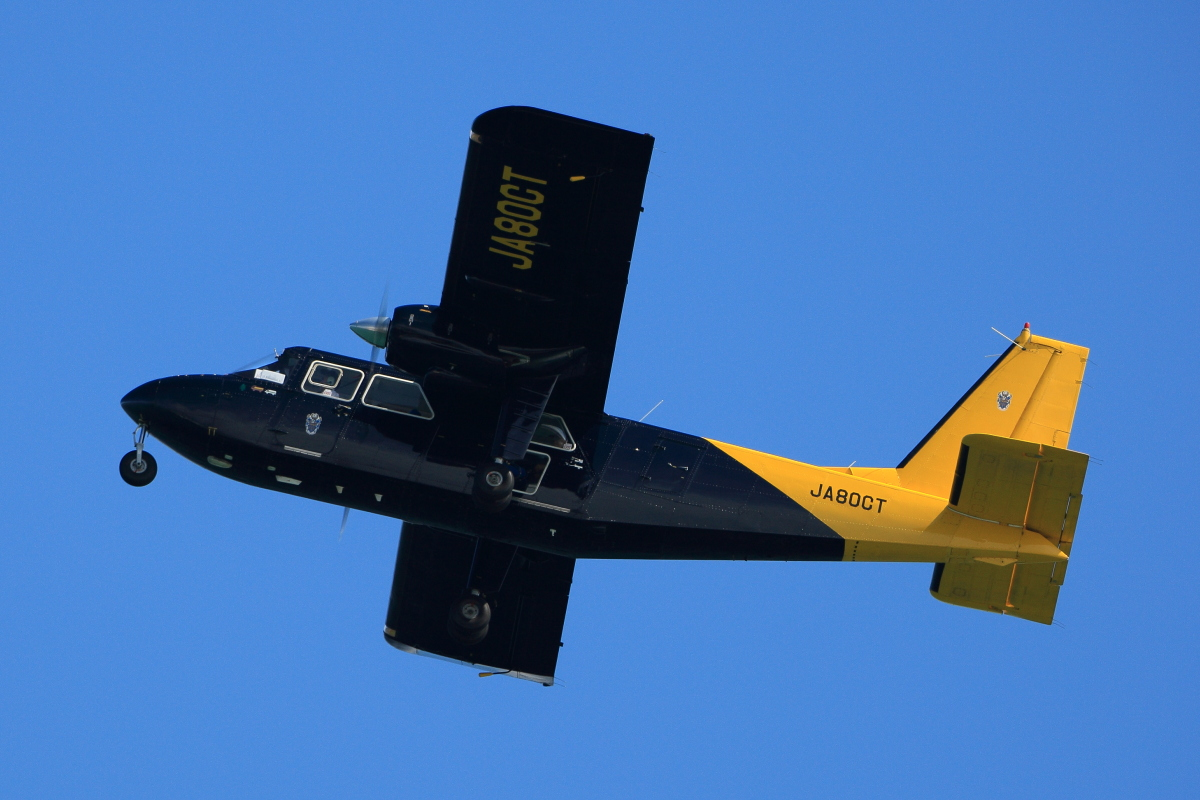
New Japan Aviation Britten-Norman BN-2 Islander

NJA began scheduled service between Niigata and Sado in February 2011. NJA suspended the route for eleven days in July 2012 after its Islander aircraft struck a car while taxiing at Niigata Airport. NJA suspended the route again in February 2013 due to a faulty generator indicator on its Islander aircraft, which could only be fixed by importing special components. The service resumed in August 2013. It is the only airline currently providing scheduled service to Sado Island, although other scheduled operators have served the airport in the past. On 28 March 2014, New Japan Aviation announced that it would suspend its Sado route. NJA has not resumed the route since then.

== Scheduled destinations ==
- Niigata Airport
- Sado Airport

== Non-scheduled destinations / charter flights ==
- Kagoshima Airport
- Satsuma Iōjima Airport
- Miyazaki Airport
- Kumamoto Airport
- Amakusa Airport
- Kitakyushu Airport
- Nagasaki Airport
- Oita Airport

== Fleet ==
- Four Cessna 172
- One Britten-Norman Islander
