= Japan Air System Flight 451 =

1993 aviation accident

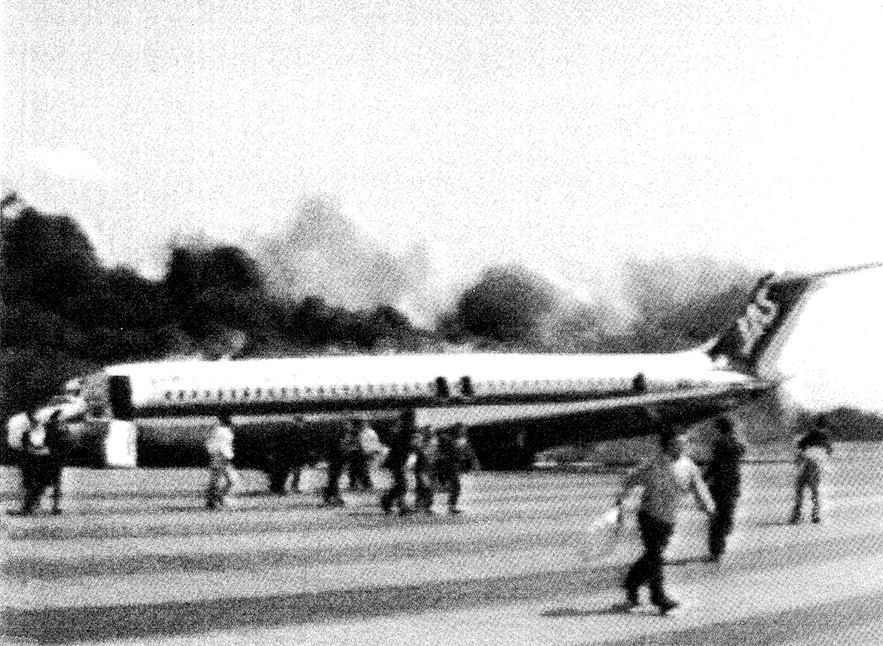
- Flight 451 burning with emergency slides deployed

Accident
- Date: 18 April 1993
- Summary: Windshear on landing complicated by pilot error
- Site: Hanamaki Airport; 39.4°N 141.1°E

Aircraft
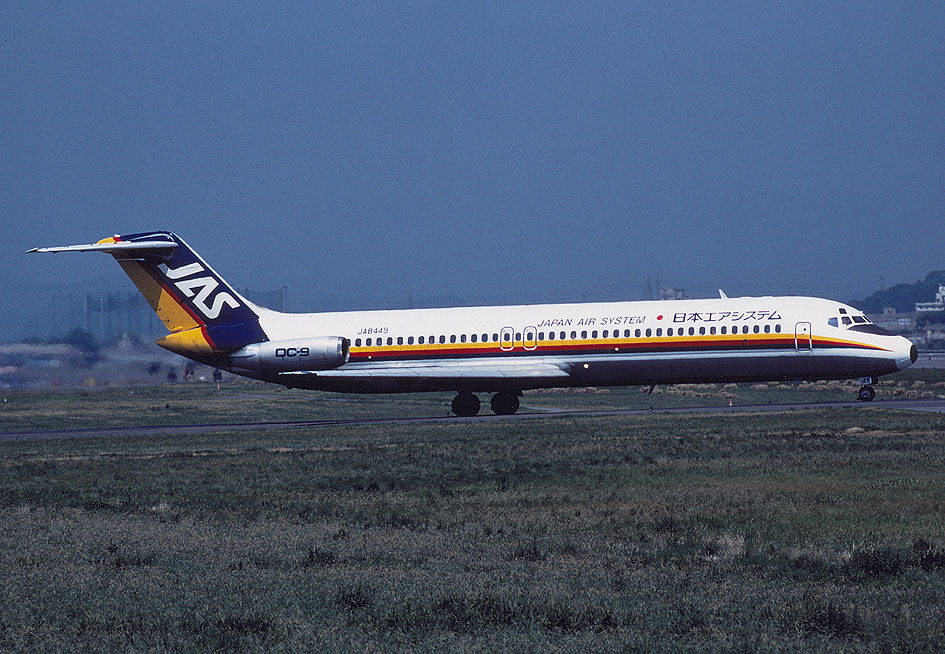
- A Japan Air System Douglas DC-9-41, similar to the one involved
- Aircraft type: McDonnell Douglas DC-9-41
- Operator: Japan Air System
- IATA flight No.: JL451
- ICAO flight No.: JAS451
- Call sign: AIR SYSTEM 451
- Registration: JA8448
- Flight origin: Nagoya International Airport
- Stopover: Hanamaki Airport
- Destination: New Chitose Airport
- Occupants: 77
- Passengers: 72
- Crew: 5
- Fatalities: 0
- Injuries: 19
- Survivors: 77

Japan Air System Flight 451 was a Japan Air System flight from Nagoya Airport in the Nagoya area of Aichi Prefecture, Japan to New Chitose Airport in Sapporo, Hokkaido Prefecture, with a stopover at Hanamaki Airport in Hanamaki, Iwate Prefecture. On 18 April 1993, the Douglas DC-9-41 operating the flight crashed while landing at Hanamaki Airport. The aircraft was written off but all 72 passengers and 5 crew survived.

== Background ==
=== Aircraft ===
The aircraft involved was a McDonnell Douglas DC-9-41 registered as JA8448. It was manufactured in the United States in 1978 and registered in Japan in September of the same year. The DC-9-41 aircraft was one of 22 planes introduced by Toa Domestic Airlines (later Japan Air System) between 1974 and 1979 for domestic local routes.

=== Crew ===
The captain on board flight 451 was a 51 year old male with 16,106 flight hours, of which, 8,468 were on the DC-9. The first officer was 27, with 380 of his 615 flight hours on the DC-9.

== Accident ==
On 18 April 1993, JA8448 departed from New Chitose Airport and flew to Hanamaki Airport, then Nagoya Airport, as part of Flight JAS 451. The flight plan indicated that it was supposed to fly back to New Chitose from Hanamaki.

The aircraft suddenly lost a significant amount of airspeed as it crossed the boundary line of a passing cold front, and encountered resultant windshear while on final approach. The somewhat inexperienced first officer was not able to conduct a missed approach fast enough to avoid a hard landing. The plane impacted the runway with such force that the gear was estimated to suffer up to +6G. causing it to puncture the fuel tank and cause a fire.

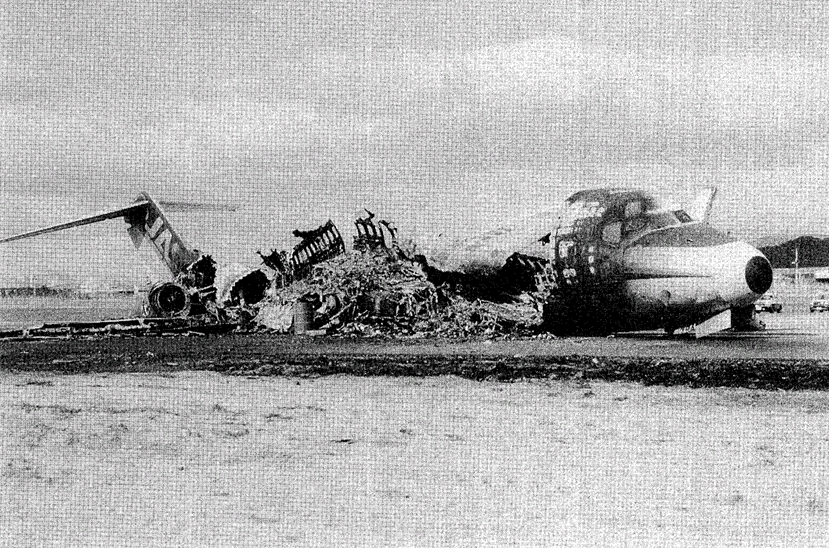
Remains of the aircraft after the fire was extinguished

All 72 passengers and five crew members survived, with 19 people sustaining injuries. The aircraft caught fire as the passengers evacuated; it was destroyed and written off.

== Investigation ==
The investigation launched almost immediately after the accident by the JTSB. It lasted approximately 10 months, ruling that pilot error and windshear was the cause of the accident. It was found that when the aircraft reached 300 feet (91 m), the wind suddenly changed and began to sink fast, causing the aircraft's warning system to announce a "Sink rate!" warning, which means that the aircraft is descending at least 100 feet (30 m) below the recommended descent rate. The resulting impact with the runway caused the landing gear root to go up into the wing, puncturing the fuel tank, and igniting, leading to the fire. The aircraft subsequently skidded off the runway and eventually stopped while burning. The survival of everyone on board was credited to the fact that the evacuation was conducted quickly and without stop. The pilots were faulted by the fact that they failed to initiate a go-around until it was too late. The probable cause of the accident was written as follows:

It was determined that the aircraft encountered windshear on short final with wind from 240° to 320° gusting 26 to 47 knots (48 to 87 km/h; 13 to 24 m/s; 30 to 54 mph). The co-pilot, who was at controls at this time was not sufficiently experienced according to the operator operational procedures. Poor supervision on part of the captain and a too late recovery were considered as contributing factors.
