= Toa Domestic Airlines Flight 63 =

1971 aviation accident in Japan

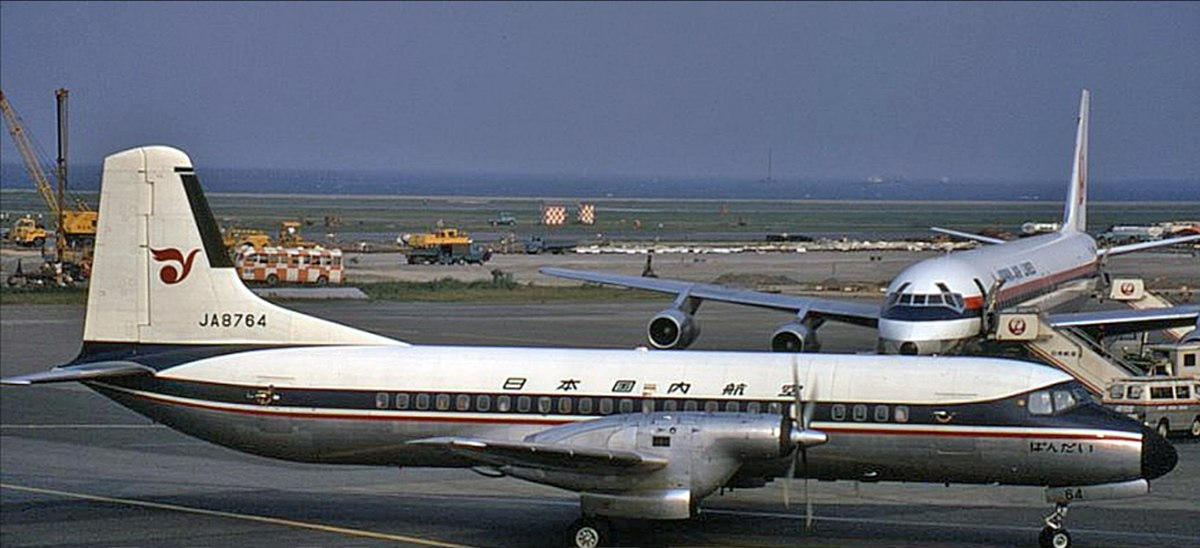
- The aircraft involved in the accident in April 1971

Accident
- Date: July 3, 1971
- Summary: Pilot error leading to CFIT
- Site: Yokotsudake, Hokkaido, Japan; 41.93333°N 140.7833°E

Aircraft
- Aircraft type: NAMC YS-11A-217
- Aircraft name: Bandai-go
- Operator: Toa Domestic Airlines
- Registration: JA8764
- Flight origin: Okadama Airport
- Destination: Hakodate Airport
- Passengers: 64
- Crew: 4
- Fatalities: 68
- Survivors: 0

Toa Domestic Airlines Flight 63, registration JA8764, was a NAMC YS-11 en route from Okadama Airport in Sapporo, Japan to Hakodate Airport. On July 3, 1971, the plane left Sapporo Okadama Airport on a scheduled flight at 08:30. After arriving in Hakodate airspace, the plane was descending below 1800 metres when it crashed at 09:05 into the south face of Yokotsudake (Yokotsu Mountain). All 64 passengers and four crew on board are killed in the scene. The cause of the crash was determined to be pilot error following strong winds which pushed the plane off course, leading to CFIT.

The Aircraft Accident Investigation Commission (AAIC) was formed soon after the crash.
