= Japan Air System =

Regional airline of Japan (1971–2006)

Japan Airlines Domestic Co., Ltd. 日本航空国内線 Nihon Kōkū Kokunaisen

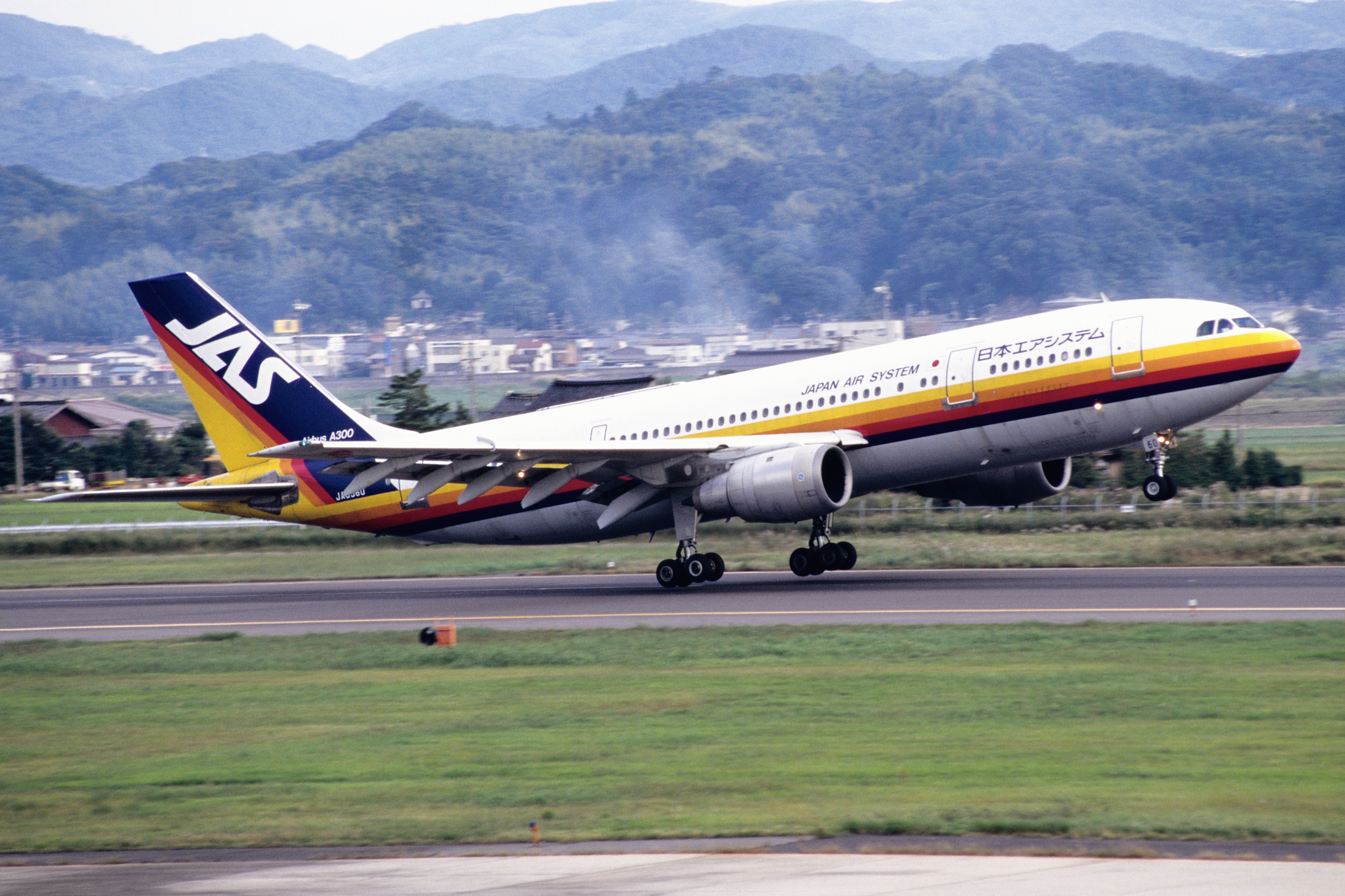
IATA	ICAO	Call sign
JD (1971–2004); JL (2004–2006)	TDA (1971–1988); JAS (1988–2004); JFL (2004–2006)	TOADOMES (1971–1988); AIR SYSTEM (1988–2004); J-BIRD (2004–2006)
- Commenced operations: May 15, 1971 (amalgamation; as TDA - Toa Domestic Airlines); April 1, 1988 (as Japan Air System (JAS)); April 6, 2004 (as Japan Airlines Domestic)
- Ceased operations: April 1, 1988 (as TDA - Toa Domestic Airlines); April 6, 2004 (as Japan Air System (JAS)); October 1, 2006 (merged into Japan Airlines)
- Hubs: Osaka–Itami; Tokyo–Haneda
- Secondary hubs: Fukuoka; Kagoshima; Sapporo–Chitose
- Focus cities: Osaka–Kansai; Tokyo–Narita
- Frequent-flyer program: JAL Mileage Bank
- Subsidiaries: Harlequin Air (1997–2005); Hokkaido Air System (1997–2006); Japan Air Commuter (1983–2006)
- Fleet size: 81
- Destinations: 46
- Parent company: JAL Group
- Headquarters: Ōta, Tokyo, Japan
- Website: www.jas.co.jp

Japan Air System (JAS), later known as Japan Airlines Domestic from 2004, was the smallest of the big three Japanese airlines. In contrast to the other two, JAL and ANA, JAS' international route network was very small, but its domestic network incorporated many smaller airports that were not served by the two larger airlines. As an independent company, it was last headquartered in the JAS M1 Building at Haneda Airport in Ōta, Tokyo. It has since merged with Japan Airlines.

JAS was famous for its variety of aircraft liveries; Amy Chavez of The Japan Times described the rainbow liveries as "abstract." Many of its color schemes in the 1990s were designed by film director Akira Kurosawa.

The airline's slogan was "Good Speed Always".

== History ==
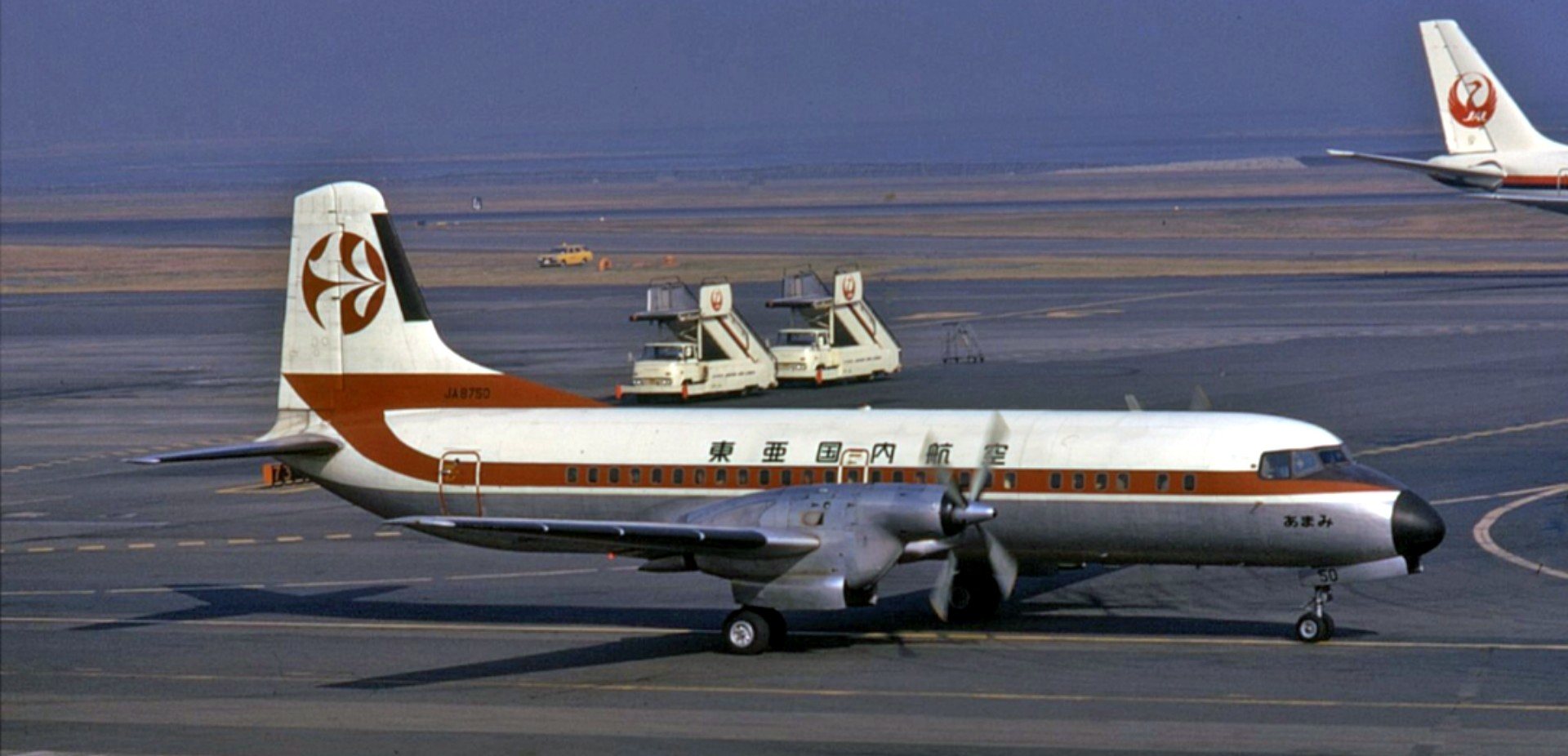
A NAMC YS-11 operating under the former name Toa Domestic.

=== Formation ===
The company was originally formed as Toa Domestic Airlines (東亜国内航空, Tōa Kokunai Kōkū) (TDA) in a merger between Toa Airways and Japan Domestic Airlines on May 15, 1971. It adopted the Japan Air System (JAS) name on April 1, 1988.

=== Start of international service ===
In 1988, Japan Air System began service from Narita to Seoul, South Korea, and Taiwan, and by 1993 JAS was also flying to Singapore, Honolulu and Indonesia. In 1995 the airline had 99 domestic routes, some international routes, 64 offices in Japan, one office in Seoul, South Korea, and one office in Guangzhou, People's Republic of China.

JAS entered into a partnership with Northwest Airlines in 1999 following several years of negotiations, allowing Northwest to codeshare on JAS domestic routes from Kansai Airport in Osaka and JAS to codeshare on Northwest flights between Japan and the US. On Northwest's fifth freedom flights between Japan and Asia, JAS was limited to codesharing on Northwest routes that JAS also had the authority to fly, such as Tokyo-Seoul.

=== Boeing 777 livery design contest ===
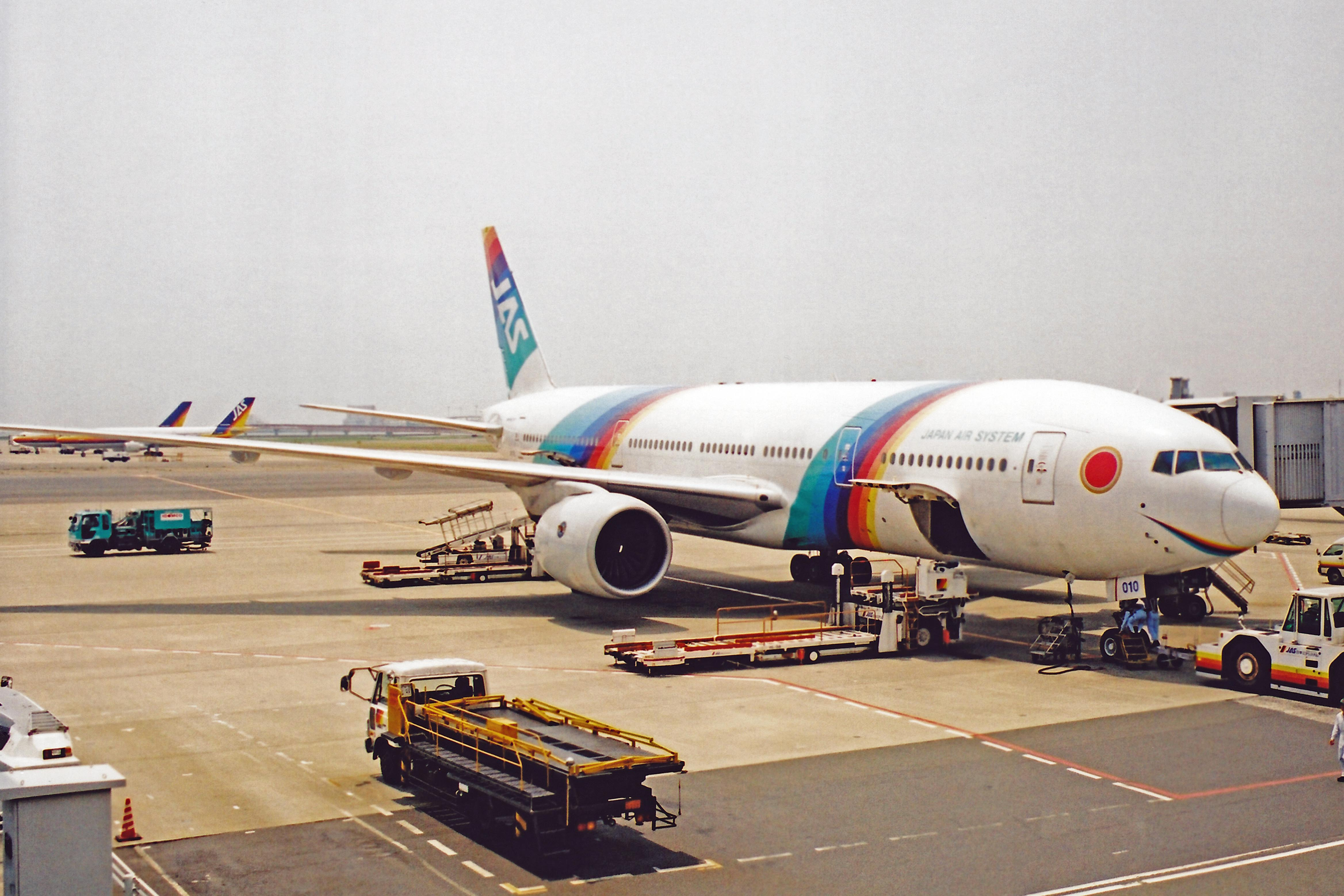
13-year old Masatomo Watanabe designed the livery of the JAS Boeing 777-200

In 1996, Japan Air System held a contest for designing the livery of the Boeing 777. The youngest entrant was three years of age while the oldest was 84. A total of 10,364 participants from 42 countries submitted entries. The judges included Akira Kurosawa, Masuo Ikeda, Kenshi Hirokane, Yoshiko Sakurai, and Yusuke Kaji (梶 祐輔, Kaji Yūsuke). Thirteen-year-old Masatomo Watanabe (渡部 真丈, Watanabe Masatomo), a male second year (Grade 8) junior high school student living near Chitose Airport, won the award. The Japan Air System Boeing 777, painted in Watanabe's design, premiered in April 1997 to commemorate the 25th anniversary of Japan Air System.

=== Merger with Japan Airlines ===
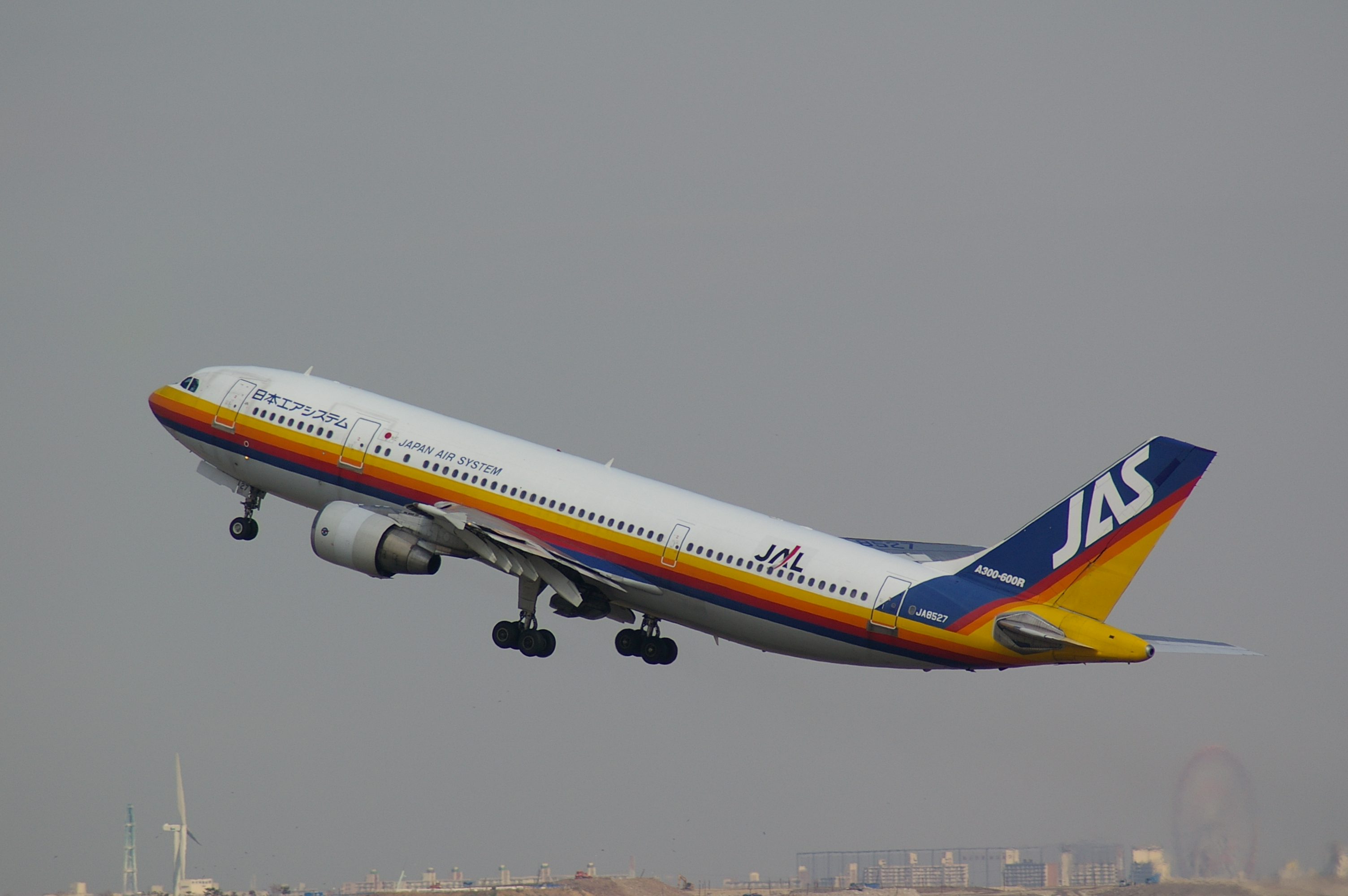
A Japan Air System Airbus A300-600R with the JAL "Arc of the Sun" logo on the body

JAS and Japan Airlines announced their merger in November 2001. It was the first major airline industry realignment in Japan in three decades, and partly a consequence of the slump in worldwide air traffic following the September 11, 2001 attacks in the United States. At the time, JAL had only a 25% share of the Japanese domestic air travel market, half that of rival All Nippon Airways, and saw the merger as a means of providing stronger competition to ANA domestically.

JAS and JAL prepared an integrated timetable in August 2002. On October 2, 2002, they established a new holding company, Japan Airlines System (日本航空システム, Nihon Kōkū Shisutemu), with Isao Kaneko as CEO. A new "Arc of the Sun" livery for the JAL group was announced in September 2002 and the first aircraft with the livery rolled out in November. On April 1, 2004, Japan Airlines changed its name to Japan Airlines International and Japan Air System changed its name to Japan Airlines Domestic (日本航空国内線, Nihon Kōkū Kokunaisen), officially ending the JAS brand. Japan Airlines Domestic was merged with Japan Airlines International on October 1, 2006, and disappeared both in name and reality.

At the time of its integration into JAL, JAS operated the Airbus A300, Boeing 777, MD-80 and MD-90. Most continued flying as part of the JAL fleet, but three A300s were scrapped at Sendai Airport in 2002, while two others were transferred to Fly Air in Turkey.

== Corporate affairs ==
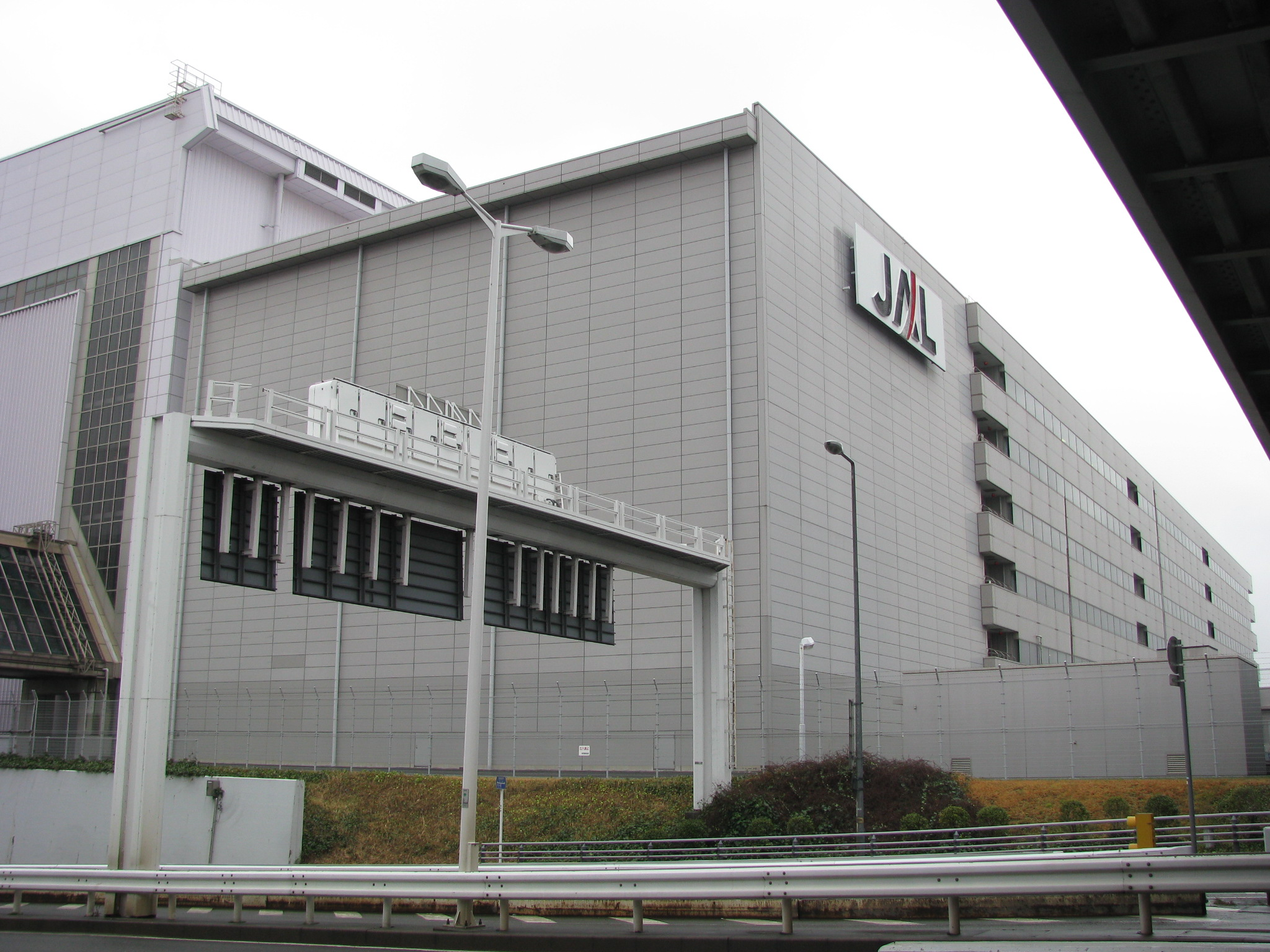
The JAL Maintenance Center, formerly the corporate headquarters

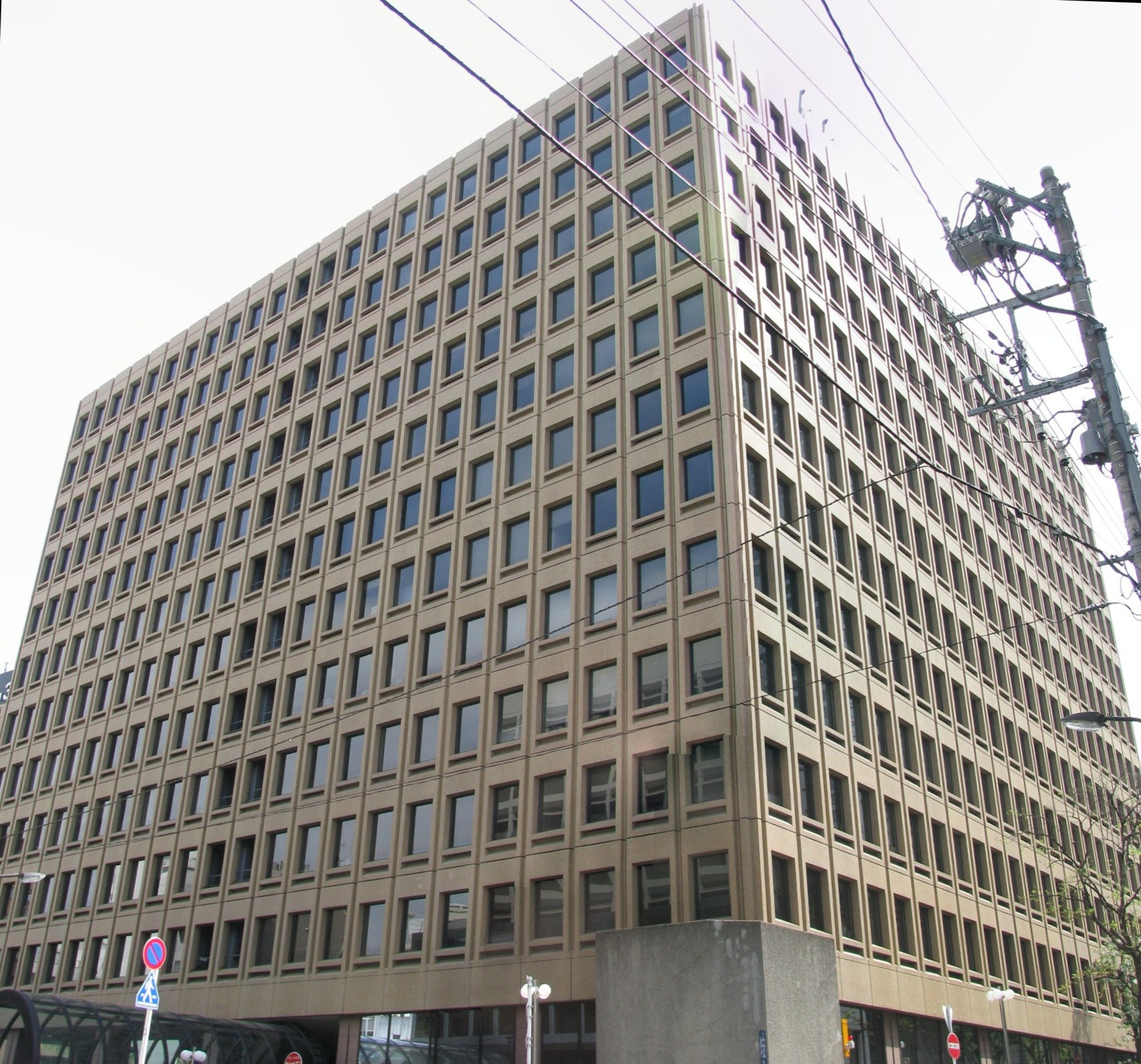
Mori Building 37 in Tokyo, where JAS once had its headquarters

When Toa Domestic Airlines was originally established on May 15, 1971, its headquarters were located at the Japan Airlines Haneda Maintenance Center (羽田日本航空メンテナンスセンター Haneda Nihon Kōkū Mentanensu Sentā) at Tokyo International Airport (Haneda Airport) in Ōta, Tokyo. On February 28, 1972, its headquarters were moved to Mori Building No. 18 (第18森ビル, Dai-jūhachi Mori Biru) in Minato, Tokyo. On July 31, 1990, the headquarters moved from Mori Building No. 18 to Mori Building No. 37 (第37森ビル, Dai-sanjūshichi Mori Biru), located in Toranomon. On April 18, 1998, the head office moved to Haneda Maintenance Center 1 (羽田メンテナンスセンター1, Haneda Mentanansu Sentā; or JAS M1 Building) at Haneda Airport. On August 11, 2003, as JAS was being merged into Japan Airlines, the JAS headquarters moved from Haneda Maintenance Center 1 to the JAL Building in Shinagawa, Tokyo.

== Destinations before merger ==
=== Domestic ===
- Japan
  - Greater Tokyo Area
  - Tokyo
  - Osaka
  - Greater Osaka Area
  - Toyooka
  - Shirahama
  - Nagoya
  - Komatsu
  - Matsumoto
  - Niigata
  - Akita
  - Aomori
  - Misawa
  - Hanamaki
  - Sendai
  - Yamagata
  - Hiroshima
  - Okayama
  - Izumo
  - Asahikawa
  - Kushiro
  - Memanbetsu (now Ozora)
  - Obihiro
  - Sapporo
  - Fukuoka
  - Kitakyūshū
  - Kagoshima
  - Kumamoto
  - Miyazaki
  - Nagasaki
  - Oita
  - Matsuyama
  - Takamatsu
  - Kōchi
  - Tokushima
  - Amami Ōshima
  - Kagoshima
  - Naha
  - Tokunoshima

=== International ===
- China
  - Guangzhou – Guangzhou Baiyun International Airport
  - Kunming – Kunming Wujiaba International Airport
  - Xi'an – Xi'an Xianyang International Airport
- Indonesia
  - Jakarta – Soekarno–Hatta International Airport
- Hong Kong
  - Hong Kong
    - Kai Tak Airport (demolished)
    - Hong Kong International Airport
- South Korea
  - Seoul
    - Gimpo International Airport
    - Incheon International Airport
- Singapore
  - Changi Airport (closed prior to JAS's dissolution)
- Taiwan
  - Taichung – Taichung International Airport
  - Taipei – Chiang Kai-shek International Airport
- United States
  - Honolulu – Daniel K. Inouye International Airport

== Subsidiaries ==
Japan Air System had the following subsidiaries:

- Japan Air Commuter
- Hokkaido Air System
- Harlequin Air

== Fleet ==
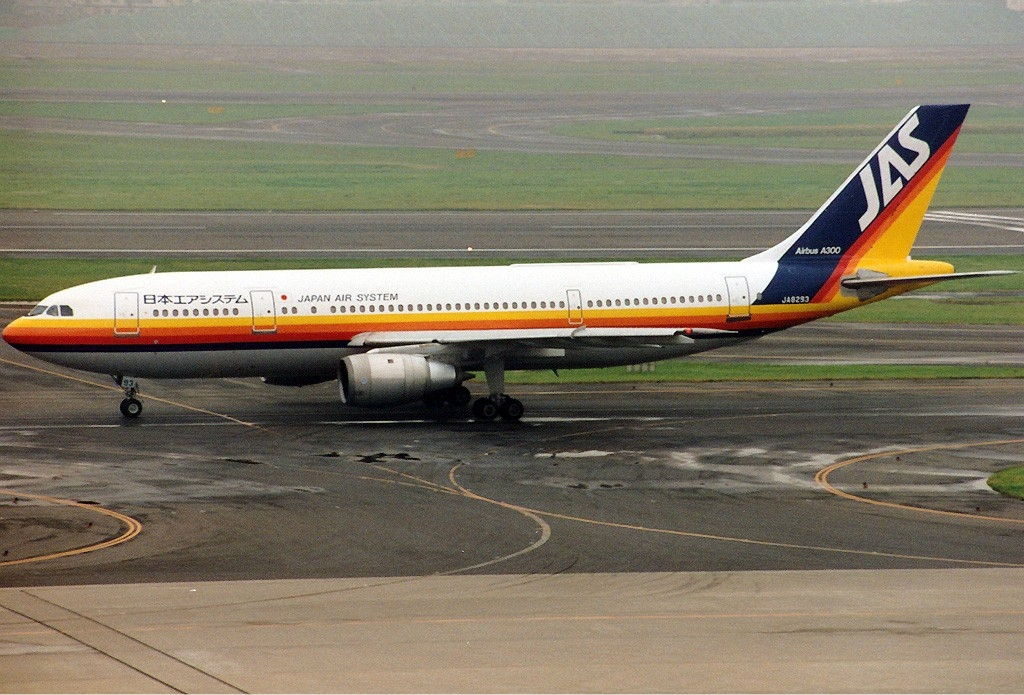
A Japan Air System Airbus A300B4 taxiing at Haneda Airport in 1996

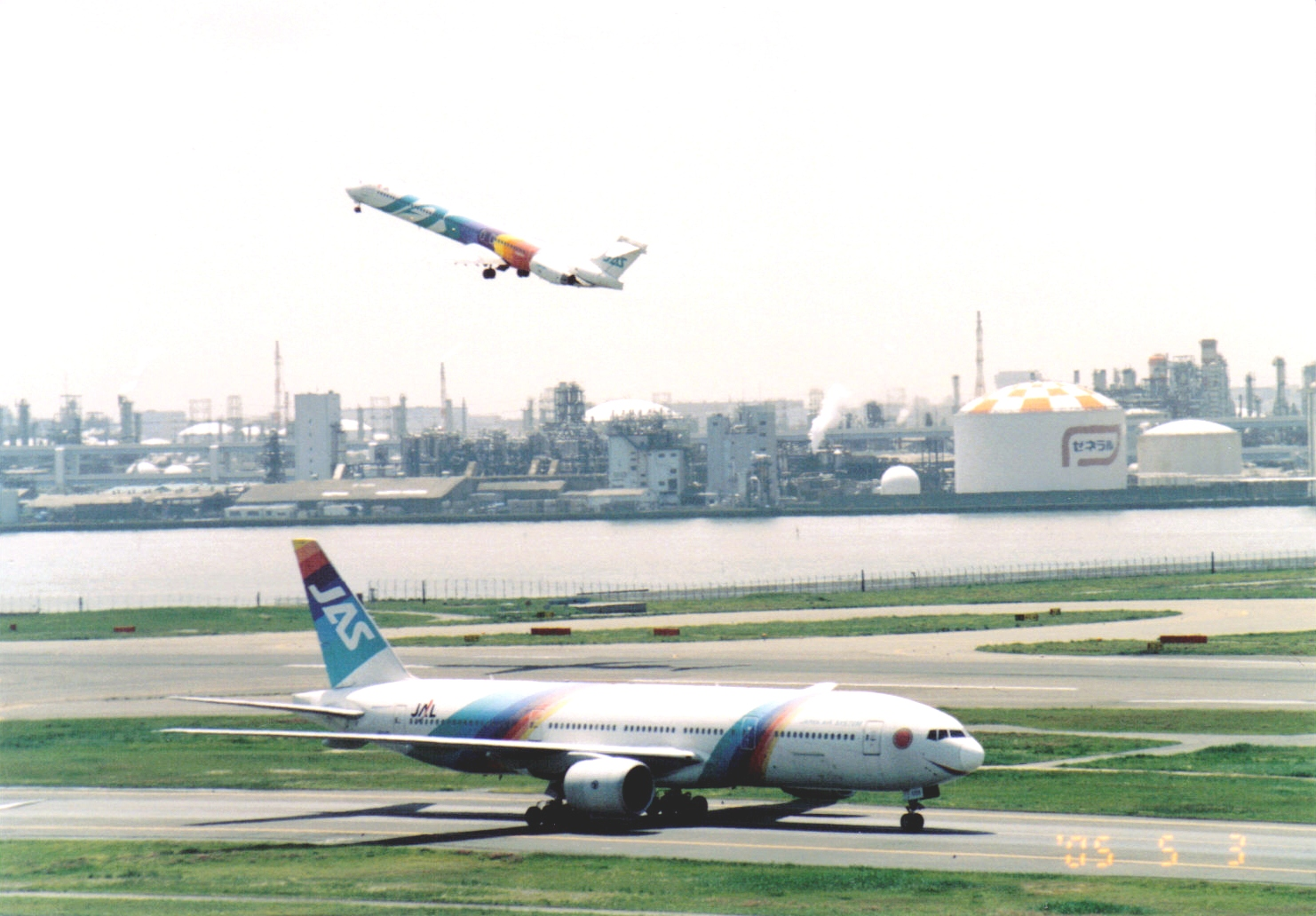
JAS MD-90 and 777 aircraft

Japan Air System (later known as Japan Airlines Domestic) had operated the following aircraft prior to merger with Japan Airlines:

Japan Air System fleet
Aircraft	Total	Introduced	Retired	Notes
Airbus A300B2	9	1980	2006	
Airbus A300B4	8	1986	2006	
Airbus A300-600R	22	1998	2006	
Beechcraft Model 18	2	1973	1976	
Beechcraft 200	3	1991	1998	
Boeing 727-100	4	1972	1976	
Boeing 777-200	7	1996	2006	
McDonnell Douglas DC-9-31	2	1973	1975	Leased from Hughes Airwest.
McDonnell Douglas DC-9-41	22	1974	1997	One written off as Flight 451. Remaining aircraft sold to Airborne Express.
McDonnell Douglas DC-9-51	1	1977	1978	Leased from Finnair.
McDonnell Douglas DC-10-30	2	1988	2000	Sold to Northwest Airlines.
McDonnell Douglas MD-81	26	1981	2006	
McDonnell Douglas MD-87	8	1988	2006	
McDonnell Douglas MD-90-30	16	1995	2006	
NAMC YS-11	46	1971	1996	

== Credit cards ==
In association with Visa, MasterCard, and Japan Credit Bureau JAS had "JAS Card" credit cards. In addition, JAS had "Sky Merit" cards.

== Accidents and incidents ==
- July 3, 1971, Toa Domestic Airlines Flight 63: A NAMC YS-11A owned by Toa Domestic Airlines crashed into terrain, killing all 68 occupants.
- May 25, 1975: A NAMC YS-11A (JA8680) had a hydraulic oil leak and forced the crew to return to Osaka. During landing, one of the tires blew causing the aircraft to veer off the runway. The aircraft crossed a sod area and a drainage ditch. The cause of the oil leak was a loose connection of the hydraulic line in the left flap well.
- April 18, 1993, Japan Air System Flight 451: A McDonnell Douglas DC-9-41, flying from Nagoya to Hanamaki, crashed after the aircraft, caught by wind shear, skidded off of the runway. All of the passengers and crew survived.

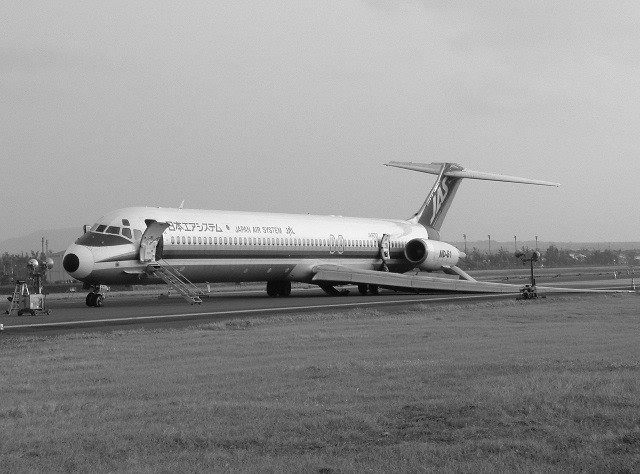
Aftermath of the landing gear accident of JAS Flight 979

- January 1, 2004, Japan Air System Flight 979: A McDonnell Douglas MD-81 (JA8297) sustained substantial damage in a landing gear accident at Tokunoshima. On landing, the aircraft's left main landing gear collapsed during rollout and its left wing tip contacted the ground. The aircraft came to a stop on the runway. Three passengers were slightly injured.

== Special liveries ==
Japan Air System, for a period, painted a McDonnell Douglas DC-10 in a Peter Pan color scheme.

== See also ==
- List of defunct airlines of Japan
