= Toki Air =

Regional airline of Japan

TOKI AIR Co., Ltd. トキエア株式会社 Tōke-ea Kabushiki-gaisha
IATA	ICAO	Call sign
BV	TOK	TOKI AIR
- Founded: July 29, 2020; 6 years ago
- Commenced operations: January 31, 2024; 2 years ago
- Hubs: Niigata Airport
- Fleet size: 3
- Destinations: 4
- Parent company: TOKI Aviation Capital
- Headquarters: Niigata, Niigata Prefecture, Japan
- Key people: Hasegawa Masaki (President)
- Website: www.tokiair.com

Toki Air is a Japanese regional airline based at Niigata Airport in the city of Niigata, Niigata Prefecture, Japan. The airline was founded on July 29, 2020 and commenced operations on January 31, 2024.

== History ==
Toki Air was established on July 29, 2020 in order to reconnect regional and remote areas across the country. The company signed a leasing agreement with Nordic Aviation Capital (NAC) for two ATR 72-600s. Additionally, the company also signed a ten-year Global Maintenance Agreement (GMA) with ATR for its two ordered 72-600s. Toki Air also plans to introduce the ATR 42-600S variant which is currently under development by ATR. Toki Air, is expected to have its first ATR 42-600S in early 2025. The purchase of the aircraft will make the company the first Japanese airline to operate this type of aircraft.

Toki Air took delivery of its first ATR 72 on October 10, 2022. The aircraft arrived at its hub at Niigata Airport on November 5, 2022.

The government of Niigata Prefecture extended 1.16 billion yen in financing to Toki on October 31, 2022.

Toki formally applied for an air operator's certificate on November 30, 2022, which was approved by the East Japan Civil Aviation Bureau of the Ministry of Land, Infrastructure, Transport and Tourism on March 31, 2023. Toki would be the first new locally owned Japanese domestic airline in 14 years (after Fuji Dream Airlines).

On August 28, 2023, a 66-year-old former employee of Oriental Air Bridge, who was the manager of the safety department, was prosecuted after it was discovered that the employee had illegally downloaded and transferred secret documents from the airline on November 25, 2022. The employee retired from the airline in December 2022 and later joined Toki Air. The employee admitted to the charges and stated that "I took these (the documents), because I thought it would be useful my next company's work." Toki Air stated that they had demoted the employee and reported the incident to the Japan Civil Aviation Bureau. Oriental Air Bridge in an interview stated that there was no impact of flight safety and the airline would work to prevent such incident from happening again.

== Destinations ==
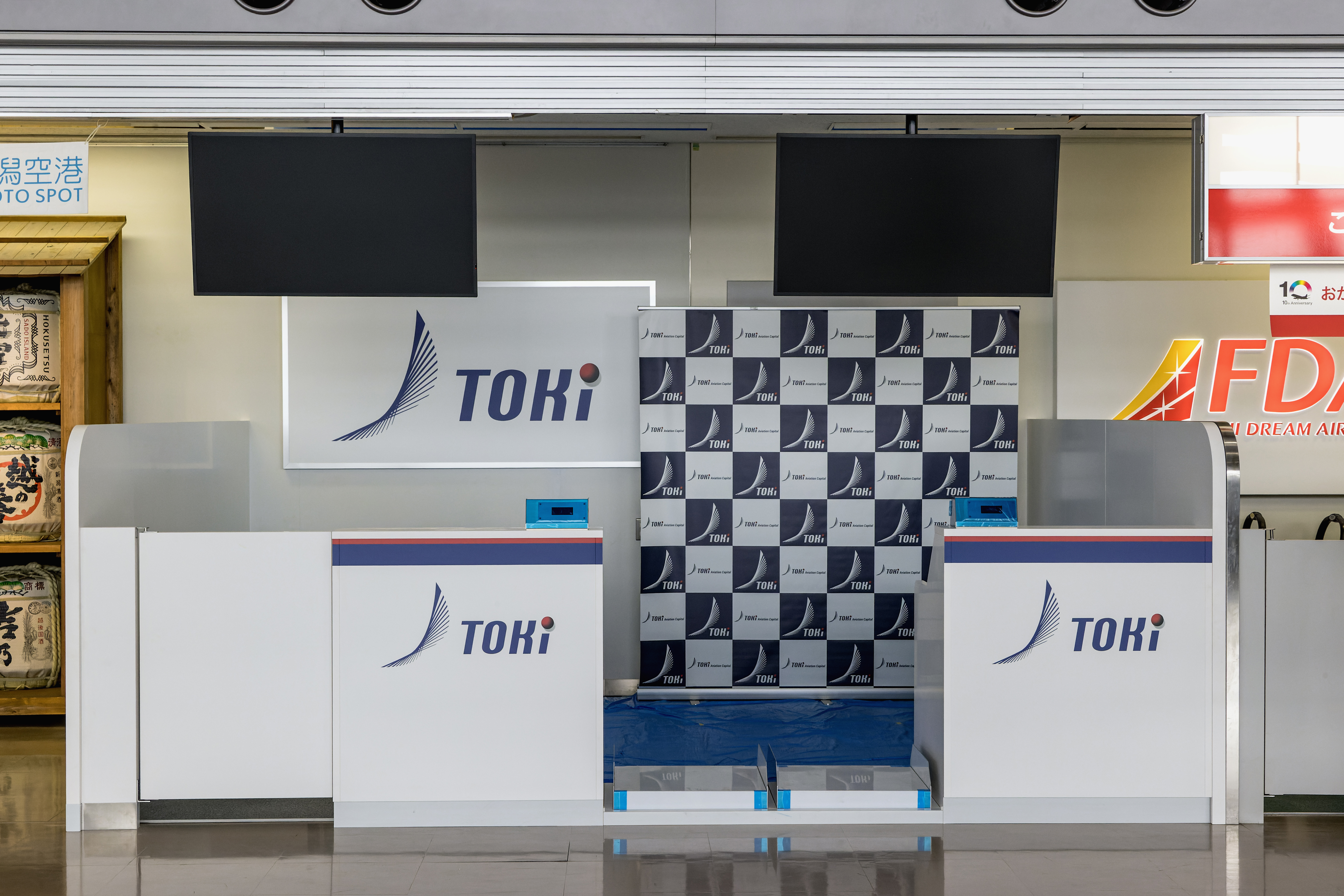
Toki Air's check-in counter at Niigata Airport

As of October 2024, Toki Air currently operates flights from Niigata to Nagoya Chubu Centrair, Sendai and Sapporo Okadama.

Island	Prefecture	City	Airport	Notes	Refs
Hokkaidō	Hokkaidō	Sapporo	Okadama Airport		
Honshū	Aichi	Tokoname	Chubu Centrair International Airport		
Honshū	Chiba	Narita	Narita International Airport	Planned	
Honshū	Hyōgo	Kobe	Kobe Airport		
Honshū	Miyagi	Sendai	Sendai Airport	Terminated	
Honshū	Niigata	Niigata	Niigata Airport	Hub	
Sado Island	Niigata	Sado	Sado Airport	Planned	

== Fleet ==
=== Current fleet ===
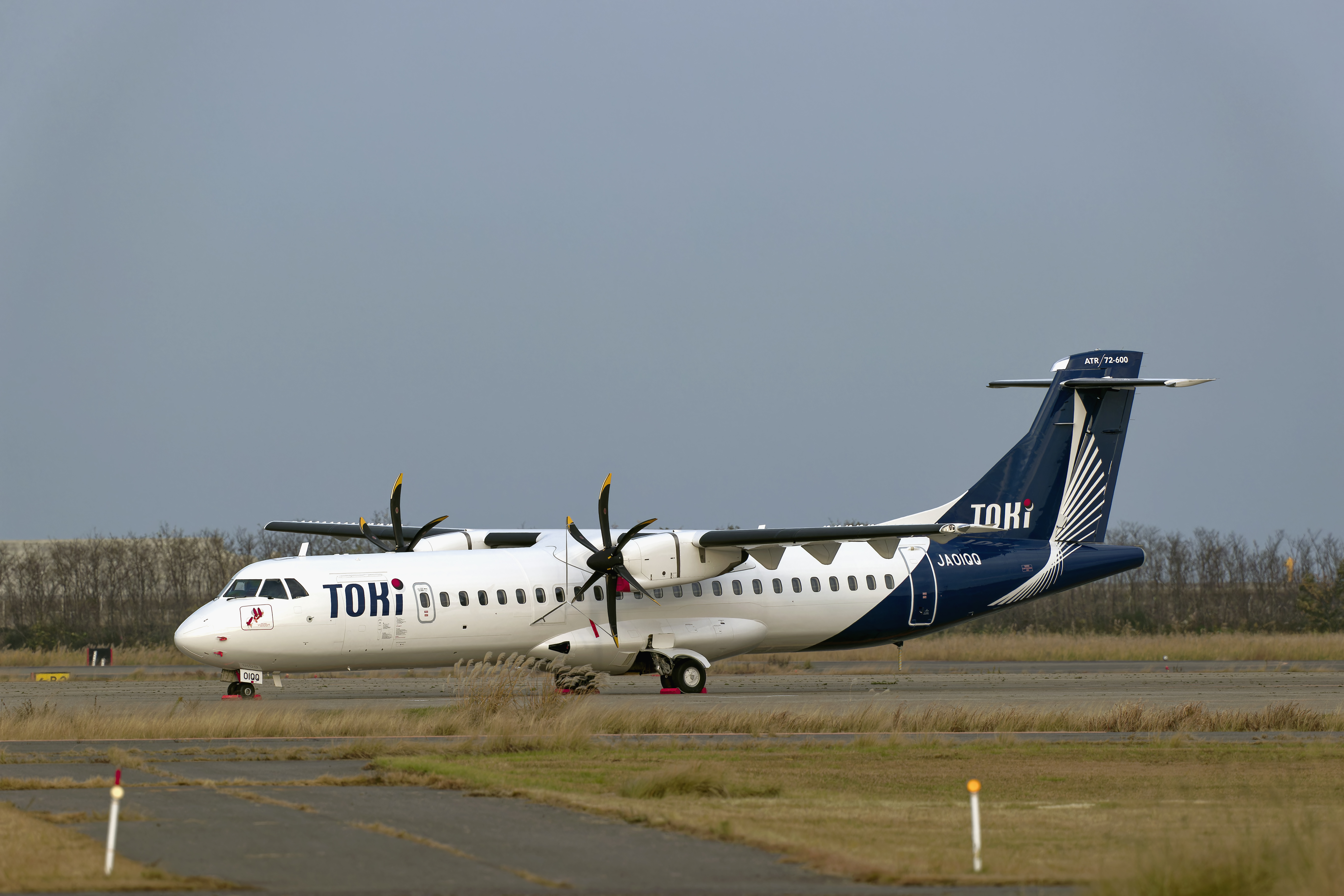
JA01QQ, an ATR 72-600 and Toki Air's first aircraft.

As of July 2026, Toki Air operates the following aircraft:

Toki Air Fleet
Aircraft	In Fleet	Orders	Passengers	Notes
ATR 42-600	1	3	48	Deliveries from December 2024.
ATR 72-600	2	—	72	First aircraft delivered in 2022.
Total	3	3		

=== Former fleet ===
As of August 2025, Toki Air operated 1 ATR 42-600 and 2 ATR 72-600.

Toki Air is also one of several airlines advising Heart Aerospace on its proposed ES-30 electric airliner.
