= Japan Domestic Airlines =

Airline of Japan (1964–1971)

Japan Domestic Airlines Co., Ltd. 日本国内航空株式会社 Nihon Kokunai Kōkū Kabushiki-gaisha
- Founded: April 15, 1964
- Ceased operations: May 15, 1971 (merged with Toa Airways to form Toa Domestic Airlines)
- Hubs: Haneda Airport

Japan Domestic Airlines (JDA) was the predecessor of Japan Air System. On April 15, 1964, Nitto Aviation Co., Ltd. (NAL) (日東航空, Nittō Kōkū), Fuji Airlines Co., Ltd. (FAL) (富士航空, Fuji Kōkū), and North Japan Airlines Co., Ltd. (NJA) (北日本航空, Kita Nihon Kōkū) merged to form Japan Domestic Airlines. On May 15, 1971, the airline merged with Toa Airways to form Toa Domestic Airlines; on April 1, 1988 the merged airline renamed itself to Japan Air System. Japan Air System merged into Japan Airlines in the early 2000s.

Nearly all of the aircraft used in the Japan Domestic Airlines' fleet were consisted of NAMC YS-11s. Both airlines had a similar color scheme from the beginning, usually blue and white, or with a blue tail. Japan Domestic Airlines focused mostly on mainland to island flights, while Toa Japanese Airlines focused on more domestic mainland flight plans and services.

== Accidents and incidents ==
- On May 29, 1965, a Convair 240 JA5088 landed at Obihiro Airport with the right side main landing gear retracted after it failed to lock down; no casualties.
- The 1966 Japan Air Lines Convair 880 crash happened on August 26, 1966. It was a training flight that crashed due to an unexplained left yaw, killing the five crew. The aircraft was on lease to Japan Airlines.

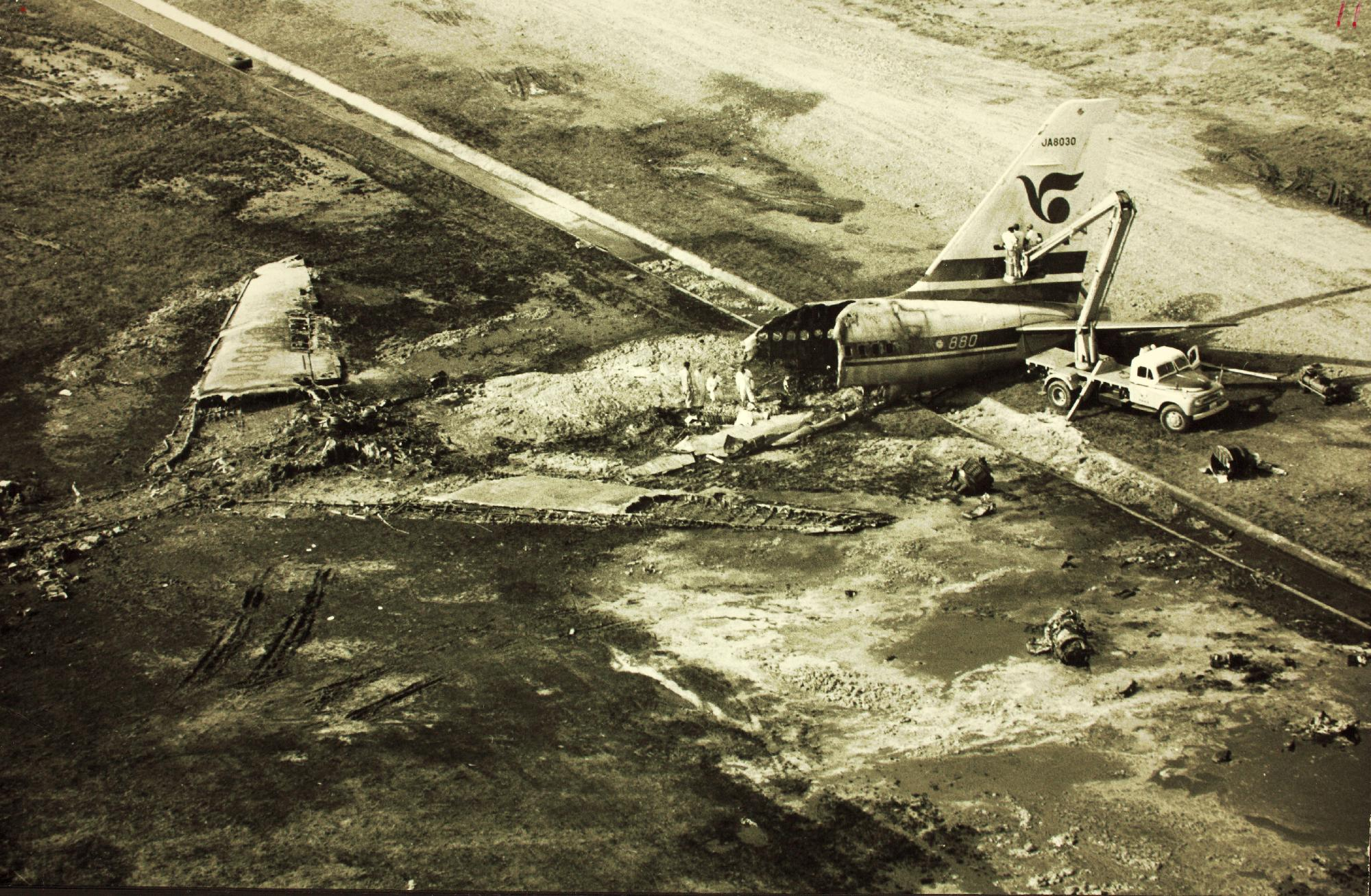
The Aftermath of JA8030.
