= Harlequin Air =

Charter airline of Japan (1997–2005)

Harlequin Air Co., Ltd. 株式会社ハーレクィンエア Kabushiki-gaisha Hārekuin Ea
IATA	ICAO	Call sign
JH	HLQ	HARLEQUIN
- Founded: January 20, 1997
- Commenced operations: December 19, 1997
- Ceased operations: April 30, 2005 (integrated into Japan Airlines Domestic)
- Hubs: Fukuoka Airport
- Fleet size: 2
- Destinations: 3 (plus 7 international charters)
- Parent company: Japan Air System
- Headquarters: Hakata-ku, Fukuoka, Japan
- Employees: Kosuke Uematsu (President & CEO)
- Website: www.harlequin-air.co.jp

Harlequin Air was an airline with its headquarters on the grounds of Fukuoka Airport in Hakata-ku, Fukuoka, Japan. It was owned by Japan Air System (later Japan Airlines Domestic in 2004), operating domestic passenger services.

Scheduled flights were wholly sold by Japan Airlines, therefore no ticket carried JH. Essentially, Japan Airlines wet leased them.

== History ==
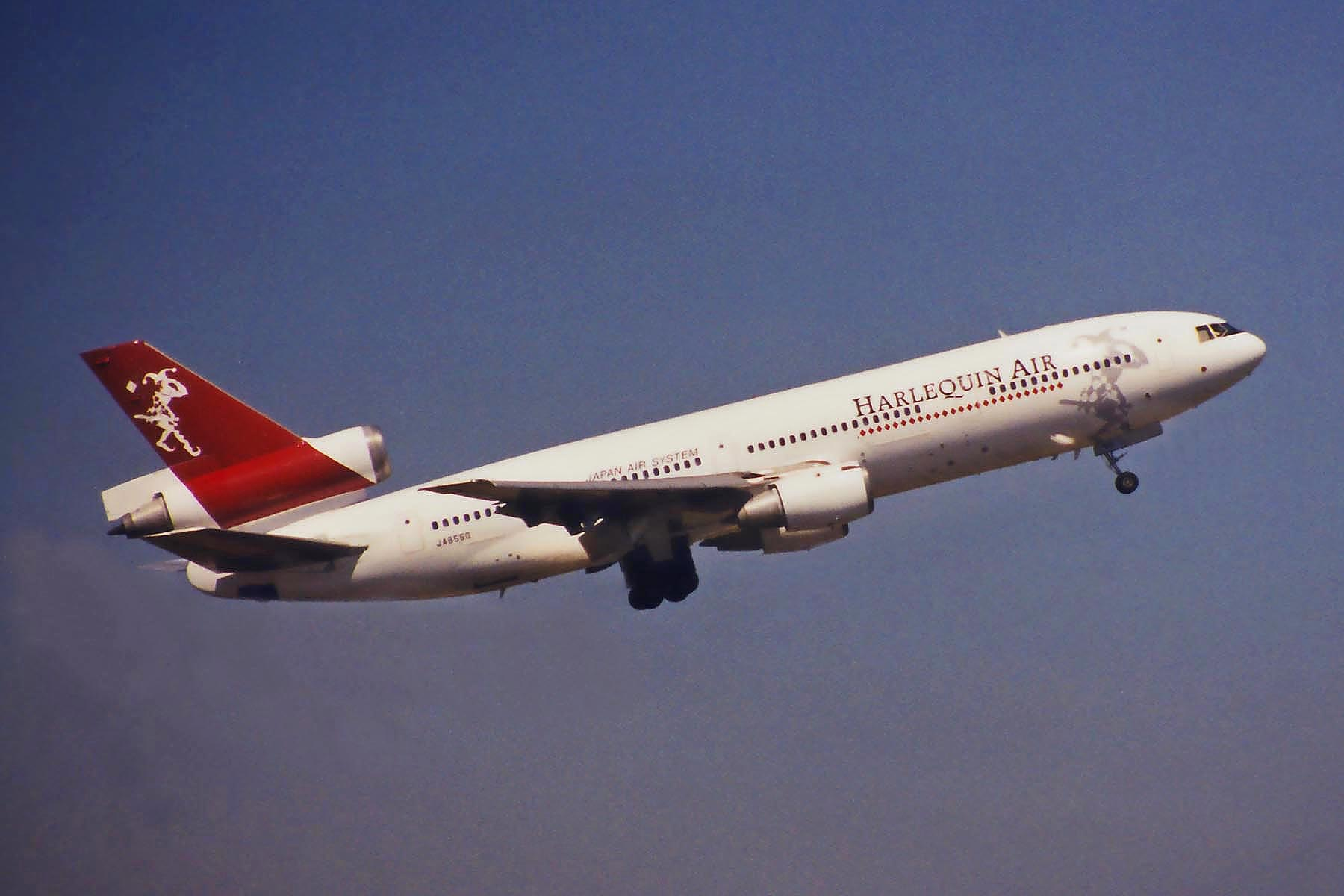
McDonnell Douglas DC-10-30, JA8550

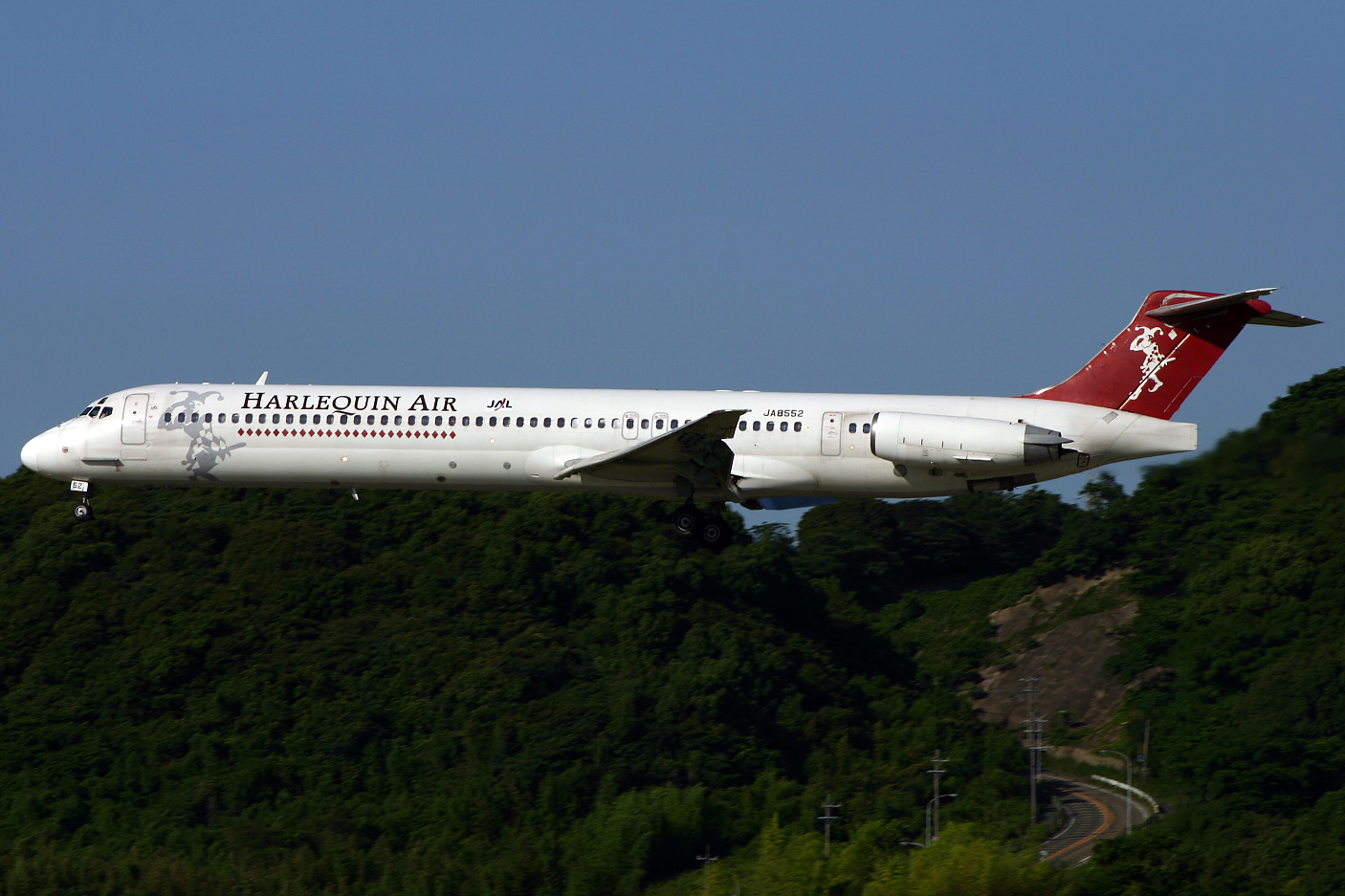
McDonnell Douglas MD-81, JA8552

The airline was established on 20 January 1997 and started operations on 19 December of that same year as an affiliate of Japan Air System.

In November 2001, JAS announced it's merger with Japan Airlines. On April 30, 2005, Harlequin Air was integrated into Japan Airlines Domestic.

== Destinations ==
Country	City	Airport	Notes
Australia	Brisbane	Brisbane Airport	Charter
Australia	Sydney	Sydney Airport	Charter
Canada	Vancouver	Vancouver International Airport	Charter
China	Guangzhou	Guangzhou Baiyun International Airport	Charter
France	Paris	Charles de Gaulle Airport	Charter
Hong Kong	Hong Kong	Hong Kong International Airport	Charter
Japan	Fukuoka	Fukuoka Airport	Hub
Japan	Nagoya	Chubu Centrair International Airport	
Japan	Sapporo	New Chitose Airport	
New Zealand	Christchurch	Christchurch Airport	Charter

== Fleet ==
During its eight-year existence, Harlequin Air operated only two aircraft (both leased from its parent company Japan Air System):

Harlequin Air fleet
Aircraft	Total	Introduced	Retired	Notes
McDonnell Douglas DC-10-30	1	1997	2000	JA8550; Operated by Japan Air System.
McDonnell Douglas MD-81	1	1998	2004	JA8552; Leased from Japan Air System.

== See also ==
- List of defunct airlines of Japan
