= Orange Cargo =

IATA	ICAO	Call sign
-	ORJ	Orange Cargo
- Founded: September 27, 2002
- Ceased operations: March 22, 2004
- Headquarters: Japan

Orange Cargo Inc. (オレンジカーゴ株式会社, Orenji Kāgo Kabushiki-gaisha) was a freight-only airline based in Japan. Founded September 27, 2002, it ceased operations on March 22, 2004 after declaring bankruptcy. Their fleet included 3 Beech 1900C aircraft. The official bankruptcy decision was acknowledged by the government in August 2005.

== Code data ==
- ICAO Code: ORJ
- Callsign: Orange Cargo
