= Niigata Airport =

Airport in Niigata, Japan

Niigata Airport 新潟空港
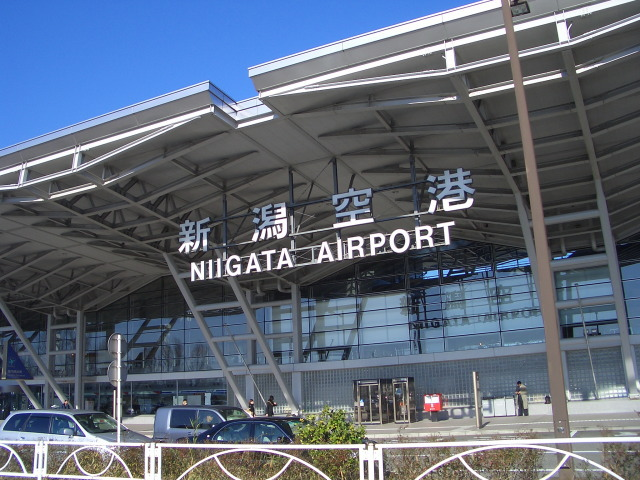
- IATA: KIJ; ICAO: RJSN

Summary
- Airport type: Public
- Owner/Operator: Ministry of Land, Infrastructure, Transport and Tourism
- Location: Niigata, Niigata Prefecture, Japan
- Hub for: Toki Air
- Elevation AMSL: 29 ft (8.8 m)
- Coordinates: 37°57′21″N 139°06′42″E

Map
- Location in Niigata Location in Niigata Prefecture Location in Japan

Runways
Direction	Length		Surface
Direction	m	ft	Surface
04/22	1,314	4,311	Asphalt
10/28	2,500	8,202	Asphalt

Statistics (2015)
- Passengers: 984,629
- Cargo (metric tonnes): 474
- Aircraft movement: 26,149
- Source: Japanese Ministry of Land, Infrastructure, Transport and Tourism

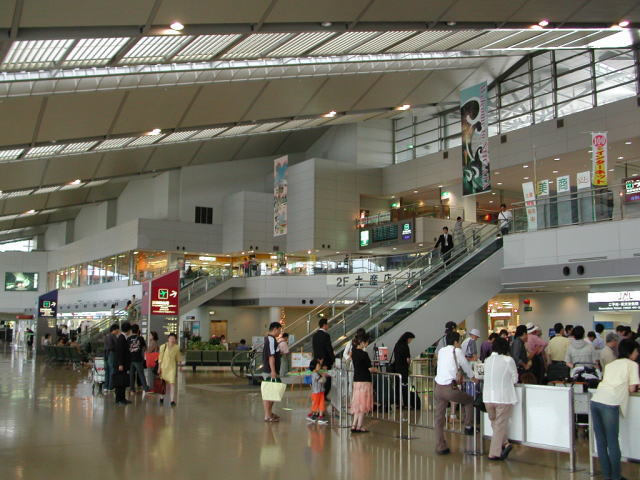
Terminal building

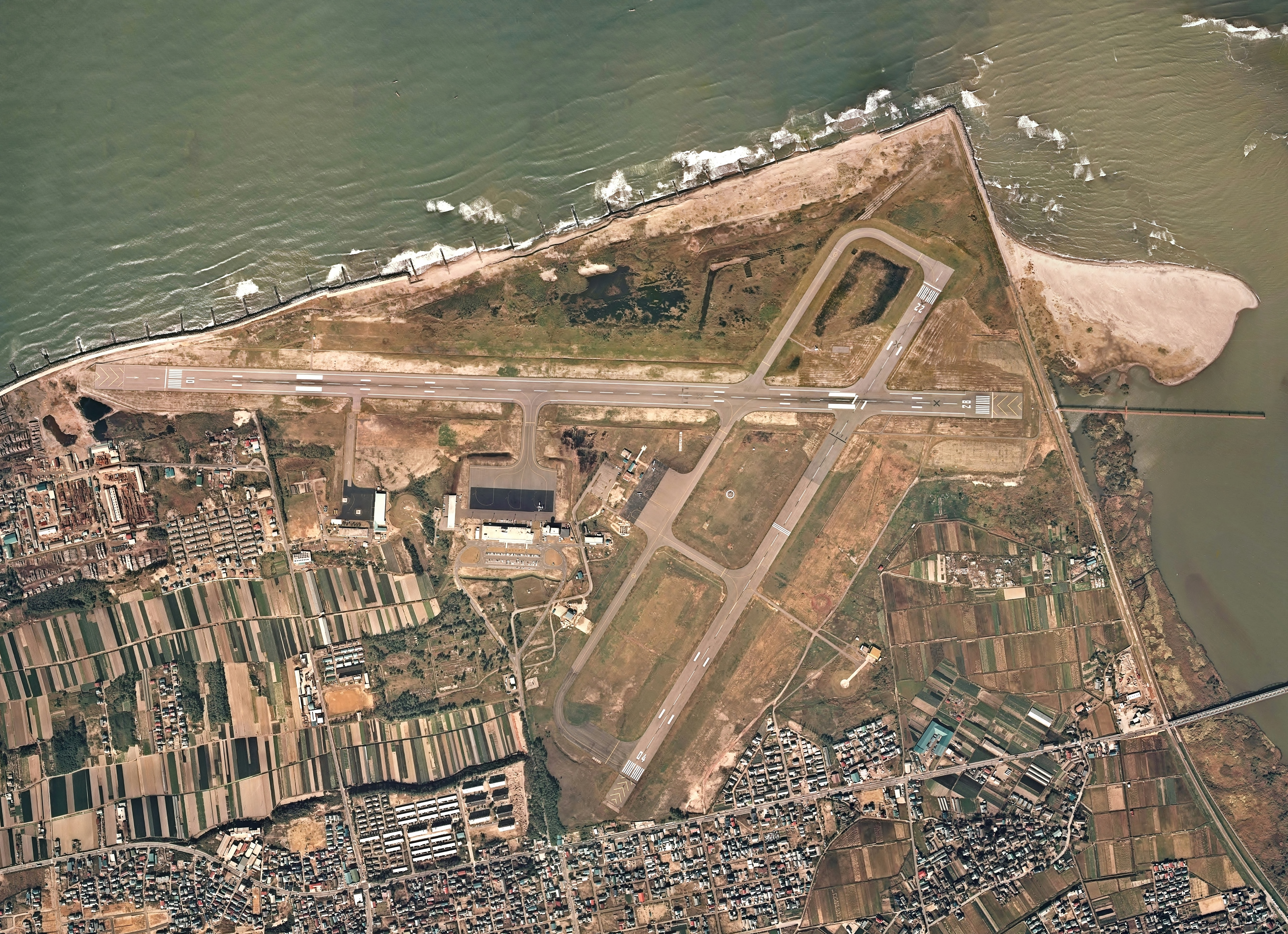
Aerial photograph of Niigata Airport in the 1970s

Niigata Airport (新潟空港, Niigata Kūkō) (IATA: KIJ, ICAO: RJSN) is an international airport located 6.7 km (4.2 mi) northeast of Niigata Station in Niigata, Japan.

== History ==
The first airport on the Sea of Japan coast of Japan was opened on an island in the Shinano River in 1929. This airport was moved to what was then the village of Matsugazakahama in 1930, and was renamed Niigata Airport. It was requisitioned for use by the Imperial Japanese Army Air Force in 1941, and came under the control of the USAAF after the end of World War II. It was returned to Japanese civilian control on March 31, 1958, on which date commercial flight operations were resumed. International services were started in 1973, with scheduled service to Khabarovsk and Niigata Airport became historically an important gateway for traffic to and from Russia, which among other purposes were used to export Niigata-area agricultural products to Russia; however, flights were reduced from winter 2010 as more slots became available for Russia service at Narita International Airport near Tokyo.

The airport saw several major service expansions in the spring of 2012, when China Eastern Airlines, Fuji Dream Airlines and All Nippon Airways announced service to Shanghai, Nagoya and Narita respectively.

== Airlines and destinations ==
The following destinations are served from Niigata:

Airlines	Destinations
All Nippon Airways	Osaka–Itami
ANA Wings	Osaka–Itami, Sapporo–Chitose
Fuji Dream Airlines	Fukuoka, Nagoya–Komaki, Sapporo–Chitose
Ibex Airlines	Fukuoka, Osaka–Itami
J-Air	Osaka–Itami
Korean Air	Seoul–Incheon
Peach	Osaka–Kansai
Tigerair Taiwan	Taipei–Taoyuan
Toki Air	Kobe, Nagoya–Centrair, Sapporo–Okadama, Sendai

== Ground transportation ==
Scheduled "limousine bus" service, heavily subsidized by Niigata Prefecture, is provided to and from Niigata Station every 20 minutes. Niigata Airport currently has no direct rail access, although regional authorities have conducted studies aimed at potentially extending the Joetsu Shinkansen high-speed rail line or other nearby ordinary rail lines to the airport.
