= List of the busiest airports in Japan =

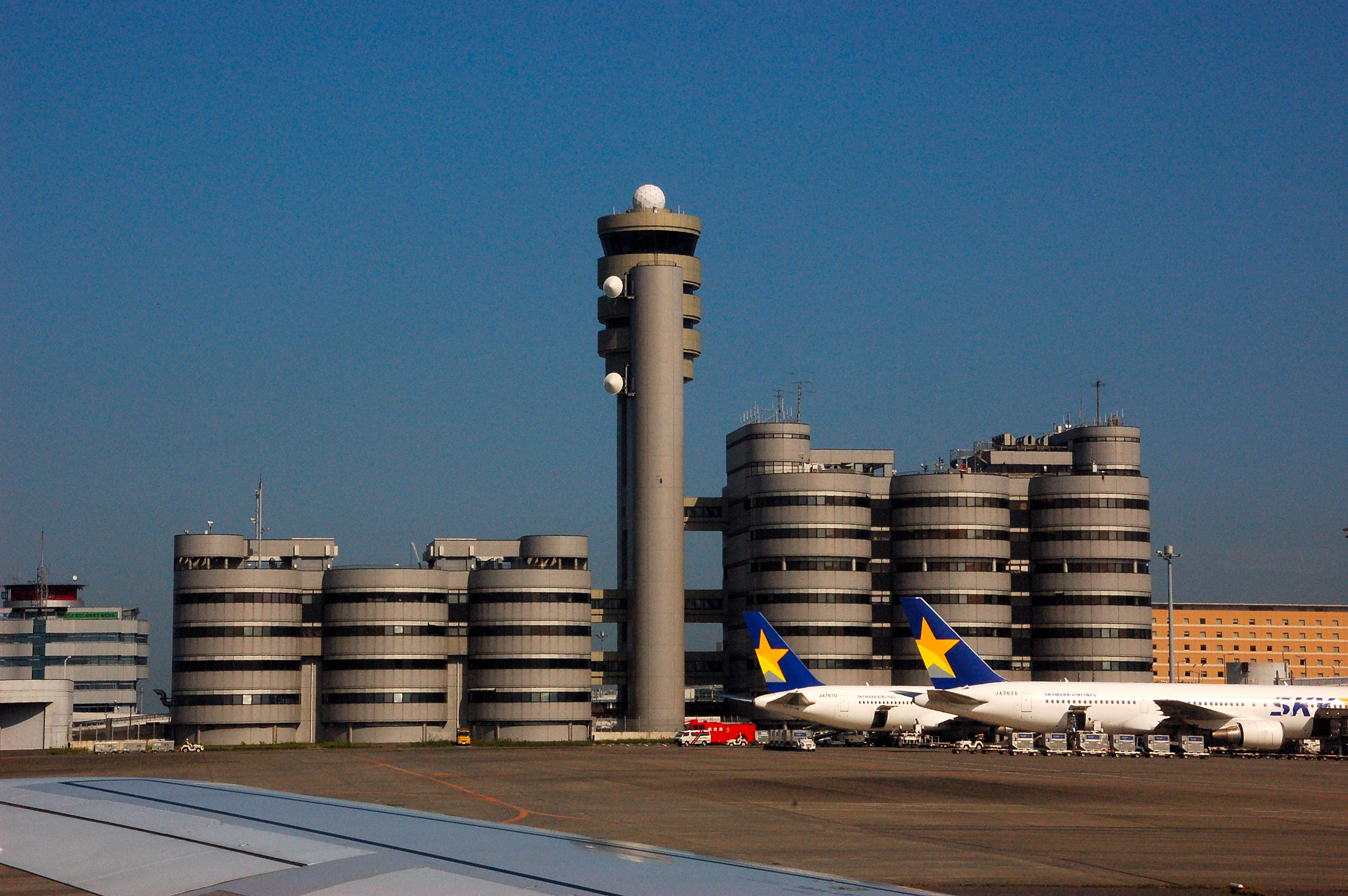
Haneda Airport maintains its position as the busiest airport by passenger traffic in Japan, despite the important influence of the COVID-19 pandemic in its operation.

Japan's busiest airports are a series of lists ranking the fifty busiest airports in the country according to the number of total passengers, and also including statistics for total aircraft movements and total cargo movements, following the official register yearly. The data here presented are provided by the Ministry of Land, Infrastructure, Transport and Tourism (MLIT), and the results are for the calendar year (as the Ministry also presents yearly results for the fiscal year).

The lists are presented in chronological order starting from the latest year. The number of total passengers is measured in persons and includes any passenger that arrives, depart or travel on transit in every airport in the country. The number of total aircraft movements is estimated, measuring airplane-times and includes the departures and arrivals of any kind of aircraft in schedule or charter conditions. The number of total cargo movements in metric tonnes and includes all the movements of cargo and mail that arrives or departs from the airport.

== Busiest Japanese airports by passenger traffic ==
The 50 busiest airports in Japan ordered by total passenger traffic, according to the MLIT reports.

Airport	City served	Region	IATA/ ICAO	2024	2022	2021	2020	2019	2018	2017	2016	2015	2014	2013	2012	2011	2010	2009	2008	2007	2006	2005	2004	2003	2002	2001	2000
Haneda Airport	Tōkyō	Kantō	HND/RJTT	85,906,170	50,427,921	26,557,863	32,101,879	87,406,105	85,435,001	83,565,476	79,232,438	75,741,306	73,141,583	68,764,743	67,211,617	62,796,249	64,211,074	61,934,302	66,707,213	66,823,414	66,089,277	63,303,843	62,291,405	62,876,182	61,079,478	58,692,688	56,402,206
Narita International Airport	Tōkyō	Kantō	NRT/RJAA	39,807,651	13,754,290	4,799,393	9,812,184	42,413,928	40,675,400	38,631,558	36,578,845	34,751,221	32,866,898	32,465,439	30,002,325	25,377,438	30,780,002	28,880,467	30,431,127	32,344,493	31,735,733	31,372,531	30,976,701	26,537,406	28,883,606	25,379,370	27,389,915
Kansai International Airport	Ōsaka	Kansai	KIX/RJBB	30,643,513	7,939,885	3,067,278	6,533,895	31,807,820	28,859,727	27,886,816	25,130,556	23,136,223	19,218,083	17,660,809	15,906,012	13,329,301	14,220,204	13,319,501	15,755,591	16,413,135	16,353,549	16,278,653	15,111,563	14,080,107	17,381,464	19,364,888	20,491,333
Fukuoka Airport	Fukuoka	Kyūshū	FUK/RJFF	26,765,836	14,824,614	8,475,937	9,583,882	24,679,617	24,639,104	23,796,849	21,994,977	20,968,463	19,703,769	18,951,652	17,416,567	15,393,954	16,344,552	15,901,604	17,291,219	17,889,693	18,191,678	18,651,670	18,510,486	18,837,600	19,493,169	19,454,529	19,687,895
New Chitose Airport	Sapporo	Hokkaidō	CTS/RJCC	23,968,186	15,227,741	8,233,438	9,299,961	24,599,263	23,313,311	22,718,612	21,311,918	20,461,531	19,270,922	18,674,344	17,463,051	15,774,467	16,748,180	16,537,566	17,656,262	18,329,412	18,392,635	17,871,752	17,605,502	18,457,467	18,835,196	18,405,090	18,023,450
Naha Airport	Naha	Okinawa	OKA/ROAH	21,705,234	13,765,285	7,415,492	9,210,360	21,761,828	21,382,843	20,973,087	19,671,854	18,336,030	17,293,780	16,039,825	15,042,959	13,725,680	14,525,656	14,036,910	15,173,957	14,950,970	14,172,504	13,494,406	12,732,720	12,544,777	11,886,263	11,027,498	11,233,913
Osaka International Airport	Ōsaka	Kansai	ITM/RJOO	15,157,501	11,528,144	6,770,089	7,672,386	16,504,209	16,184,901	15,597,777	14,923,678	14,541,936	14,526,575	13,823,922	13,218,471	12,775,797	14,788,543	14,562,851	15,632,777	16,238,849	17,050,440	18,948,300	19,316,582	18,829,733	17,627,571	16,877,207	16,344,400
Chubu Centrair International Airport	Nagoya	Chūbu	NGO/RJGG	11,038,828	4,970,336	2,541,682	3,812,815	13,460,149	12,029,572	11,446,244	10,843,122	10,177,713	9,755,531	9,552,867	9,102,000	8,636,108	9,271,382	9,178,791	10,994,749	11,617,797	11,652,700	10,763,581	N/A	N/A	N/A	N/A	N/A
Kagoshima Airport	Kagoshima	Kyūshū	KOJ/RJFK	5,637,891	4,064,791	2,429,810	2,576,230	6,075,210	5,978,619	5,617,997	5,372,961	5,220,710	5,154,250	5,042,755	4,709,130	4,461,208	4,967,625	5,032,123	5,539,453	5,596,210	5,712,889	5,714,196	5,810,884	6,224,803	6,261,349	6,063,987	6,113,667
Sendai Airport	Sendai	Tōhoku	SDJ/RJSS	3,778,423	2,529,942	1,497,738	1,621,148	3,855,387	3,579,675	3,370,493	3,110,363	3,152,569	3,213,337	3,075,633	2,666,464	1,717,102	2,826,277	2,798,647	3,049,257	3,350,083	3,336,314	3,232,418	3,222,084	3,191,501	3,223,478	3,243,803	3,291,928
Kobe Airport	Kōbe	Kansai	UKB/RJBE	3,576,118	2,701,449	1,625,715	1,625,487	3,362,720	3,181,700	3,109,042	2,697,927	2,435,110	2,497,755	2,323,192	2,476,634	2,538,578	2,224,035	2,330,076	2,706,397	2,964,163	2,380,829	N/A	N/A	N/A	N/A	N/A	N/A
Kumamoto Airport	Kumamoto	Kyūshū	KMJ/RJFT	3,544,043	2,263,376	1,177,315	1,309,876	3,492,188	3,409,760	3,303,242	2,986,686	3,241,633	3,067,624	2,989,294	2,912,028	2,816,245	2,874,963	2,851,772	3,107,076	3,172,362	3,137,184	3,125,270	3,049,281	3,053,818	2,863,564	2,769,086	2,717,086
Miyazaki Airport	Miyazaki	Kyūshū	KMI/RJFM	3,116,019	2,226,599	1,234,579	1,386,778	3,410,361	3,337,646	3,170,368	3,074,788	2,976,563	2,852,009	2,815,154	2,660,584	2,414,328	2,683,058	2,709,625	2,992,970	3,026,518	3,081,863	3,098,481	3,082,042	3,225,752	3,329,087	3,343,080	3,348,025
Nagasaki Airport	Nagasaki	Kyūshū	NGS/RJFU	3,065,040	2,231,184	1,140,929	1,340,879	3,360,170	3,229,969	3,165,385	2,967,421	3,110,686	2,964,474	2,812,748	2,662,086	2,410,528	2,331,002	2,340,070	2,524,159	2,631,212	2,641,228	2,616,316	2,637,308	2,834,288	2,853,499	2,846,611	2,957,437
Ishigaki Airport	Ishigaki	Okinawa	ISG/ROIG		2,157,356	1,299,773	1,489,765	2,614,822	2,557,269	2,505,886	2,421,529	2,308,065	2,325,230	2,069,026	1,620,164	1,531,509	1,693,069	1,756,347	1,865,056	1,924,420	1,957,361	1,864,467	1,785,532	1,755,730	1,504,927	1,438,662	1,422,735
Matsuyama Airport	Matsuyama	Shikoku	MYJ/RJOM		1,928,859	1,005,333	1,196,596	3,152,419	3,138,693	3,028,693	2,894,786	2,863,239	2,838,910	2,549,315	2,342,288	2,181,268	2,381,354	2,366,077	2,574,224	2,708,631	2,725,614	2,682,770	2,626,757	2,672,405	2,687,850	2,664,555	2,687,327
Hiroshima Airport	Hiroshima	Chūgoku	HIJ/RJOA		1,716,694	882,590	1,157,906	3,166,572	2,958,430	2,975,385	2,851,436	2,669,210	2,677,134	2,622,309	2,691,361	2,509,855	2,810,188	2,844,970	3,188,637	3,325,960	3,332,201	3,275,899	3,304,658	3,362,316	3,439,088	3,343,230	3,326,527
Miyako Airport	Miyako-jima	Okinawa	MMY/ROMY		1,364,403	840,652	1,025,177	1,803,490	1,759,808	1,664,038	1,530,294	1,335,697	1,298,304	1,254,103	1,272,774	1,093,670	1,092,553	1,049,585	1,096,145	1,109,089	1,119,120	1,093,834	1,078,840	1,042,705	1,019,108	1,010,881	1,002,062
Oita Airport	Ōita	Kyūshū	OIT/RJFO		1,293,492	737,104	812,674	1,982,377	1,978,483	1,900,229	1,812,639	1,849,834	1,732,422	1,662,588	1,484,014	1,350,025	1,536,045	1,550,956	1,757,263	1,856,625	1,875,381	1,863,315	1,878,604	1,987,960	2,001,657	1,995,239	2,059,481
Hakodate Airport	Hakodate	Hokkaidō	HKD/RJCH		1,252,568	689,395	765,948	1,800,577	1,763,710	1,791,083	1,744,682	1,772,052	1,686,747	1,629,527	1,492,722	1,394,499	1,582,464	1,503,821	1,743,662	1,901,532	2,019,140	2,092,662	2,188,334	2,375,018	2,432,822	2,394,405	2,262,033
Takamatsu Airport	Takamatsu	Shikoku	TAK/RJOT		1,161,834	555,911	712,077	2,152,430	2,042,504	1,998,087	1,844,518	1,809,820	1,725,227	1,518,185	1,412,791	1,292,031	1,423,323	1,367,746	1,487,762	1,517,312	1,509,138	1,485,652	1,506,902	1,532,591	1,560,342	1,589,181	1,609,704
Kōchi Airport	Kōchi, Kōchi	Shikoku	KCZ/RJOK		1,149,367	637,693	704,492	1,656,279	1,518,090	1,478,110	1,408,326	1,350,930	1,335,214	1,307,209	1,215,073	1,144,417	1,273,146	1,193,869	1,335,911	1,403,657	1,497,688	1,537,585	1,575,679	1,694,472	1,770,980	1,822,334	1,931,804
Komatsu Airport	Komatsu	Chūbu	KMQ/RJNK		985,302	466,597	644,230	1,887,535	1,766,998	1,779,221	1,705,320	1,844,117	2,313,403	2,269,615	2,159,222	1,933,892	2,117,984	2,068,766	2,411,634	2,466,061	2,541,446	2,471,111	2,498,037	2,601,778	2,644,936	2,591,615	2,587,710
Aomori Airport	Aomori	Tōhoku	AOJ/RJSA		887,053	435,237	485,652	1,253,791	1,192,156	1,167,436	1,072,554	992,696	912,990	860,158	824,818	823,346	1,030,985	1,054,321	1,161,285	1,271,852	1,254,325	1,274,200	1,301,395	1,462,054	1,603,724	1,548,747	1,616,471
Akita Airport	Akita	Tōhoku	AXT/RJSK		840,619	367,178	449,086	1,380,863	1,339,494	1,322,221	1,233,827	1,238,082	1,219,815	1,197,689	1,156,586	1,111,190	1,108,293	1,093,556	1,206,960	1,300,675	1,329,676	1,349,774	1,343,281	1,349,791	1,325,030	1,313,745	1,230,046
Asahikawa Airport	Asahikawa	Hokkaidō	AKJ/RJEC		766,453	388,978	438,171	1,158,948	1,124,071	1,122,505	1,140,822	1,148,825	1,098,230	1,067,812	1,063,264	940,657	1,198,376	1,186,436	1,312,219	1,253,163	1,265,436	1,184,550	1,117,902	1,095,253	1,066,845	989,610	973,239
Nagoya Airfield	Nagoya	Chūbu	NKM/RJNA		759,445	451,961	444,136	942,753	913,539	902,066	870,082	735,114	653,766	593,170	479,193	299,217	445,043	433,473	414,064	438,304	387,542	1,563,230	10,695,160	9,799,768	10,524,102	10,580,972	10,889,003
Okayama Airport	Okayama	Chūgoku	OKJ/RJOB		751,518	339,092	478,923	1,611,958	1,590,920	1,524,217	1,437,121	1,391,723	1,348,209	1,343,079	1,352,078	1,236,728	1,348,054	1,319,263	1,441,439	1,547,912	1,592,750	1,589,071	1,580,917	1,583,308	1,319,627	1,033,339	923,925
Amami Airport	Amami	Kyūshū	ASJ/RJKA		738,430	584,658	557,615	891,990	848,783	760,241	695,804	676,601	603,762	556,111	535,372	534,022	526,697	544,391	557,644	584,915	602,124	602,994	606,783	639,802	627,646	627,604	617,325
Kitakyushu Airport	Kitakyūshū	Kyūshū	KKJ/RJFR		737,335	437,055	560,408	1,753,525	1,749,962	1,638,783	1,330,777	1,317,504	1,277,717	1,358,100	1,262,236	1,150,720	1,199,743	1,158,888	1,237,928	1,252,544	1,107,896	313,752	287,360	272,815	239,870	N/A	N/A
Izumo Airport	Izumo	Chūgoku	IZO/RJOC		735,674	387,281	454,128	1,051,155	1,002,395	940,426	897,181	832,825	783,626	817,907	691,654	624,863	701,699	694,022	763,969	747,647	737,249	721,395	750,931	778,488	766,022	725,406	774,783
Tokushima Airport	Tokushima	Shikoku	TKS/RJOS		720,265	343,905	420,220	1,218,852	1,157,235	1,113,367	1,059,428	1,000,121	1,011,853	954,667	883,342	757,550	808,441	758,354	830,431	870,028	884,467	961,562	956,923	946,568	935,946	987,231	997,969
Niigata Airport	Niigata	Chūbu	KIJ/RJSN		698,062	347,941	442,419	1,201,419	1,123,897	1,016,991	993,148	984,629	1,011,945	998,392	963,731	861,271	941,877	963,154	1,095,224	1,211,989	1,242,760	1,249,580	1,445,166	1,263,816	1,269,039	1,257,964	1,268,123
Memanbetsu Airport	Ōzora	Hokkaidō	MMB/RJCM		663,051	409,410	377,364	860,458	833,568	824,715	768,990	757,103	737,504	731,043	718,374	657,616	710,957	768,198	917,631	972,325	1,088,195	1,015,350	995,805	1,084,811	1,060,205	1,063,786	1,059,770
Kushiro Airport	Kushiro	Hokkaidō	KUH/RJCK		630,435	394,469	429,528	866,970	775,019	742,279	715,737	685,379	680,607	676,834	637,603	601,378	709,151	736,812	804,501	877,242	909,704	952,193	923,681	979,014	948,612	945,367	901,468
Yamaguchi Ube Airport	Yamaguchi/Ube	Chūgoku	UBJ/RJDC		610,168	326,545	385,218	1,028,166	1,039,282	1,008,048	945,021	918,238	863,421	839,068	846,726	743,852	795,973	787,645	872,088	900,021	909,512	932,223	927,021	982,612	859,936	737,427	700,054
Ibaraki Airport	Tōkyō	Kantō	IBR/RJAH		494,515	257,685	313,533	822,208	733,397	655,668	605,944	538,227	513,852	389,402	395,302	277,721	145,221	0	0	0	0	0	0	N/A	N/A	N/A	N/A
Obihiro Airport	Obihiro	Hokkaidō	OBO/RJCB		489,897	257,011	284,882	701,557	675,068	669,361	621,100	605,703	583,480	571,477	565,524	511,862	551,805	561,557	620,869	646,232	644,304	681,052	657,750	665,576	709,084	698,866	678,105
Hanamaki Airport	Hanamaki	Tōhoku	HNA/RJSI		353,349	181,589	199,584	516,742	478,125	432,507	421,825	395,647	395,329	368,801	327,564	290,781	284,994	355,410	371,860	412,273	452,384	506,012	475,081	504,364	514,391	512,047	528,066
Miho-Yonago Airport	Yonago	Chūgoku	YGJ/RJOH		340,970	171,037	219,807	692,137	674,989	658,823	616,910	666,445	864,528	575,543	463,252	418,034	468,694	438,246	490,065	499,253	495,208	476,392	473,780	445,873	445,285	442,385	414,219
Shizuoka Airport	Shizuoka	Chūbu	FSZ/RJNS		328,296	166,838	225,844	805,195	717,363	671,582	616,384	699,276	506,950	460,657	439,811	430,525	593,233	364,405	0	0	0	0	0	N/A	N/A	N/A	N/A
Shimojishima Airport	Shimojishima	Okinawa	SHI/RORS		319,684	203,214	115,424	126,159	27	3	25	3	0	0	0	0	105	898	0	329	0	0	0	N/A	N/A	N/A	N/A
Marine Corps Air Station Iwakuni	Iwakuni	Chūgoku	IWK/RJOI		292,863	110,017	156,092	513,750	519,643	483,004	435,423	363,559	360,141	356,170	20,780	0	0	0	0	0	0	0	0	N/A	N/A	N/A	N/A
Saga Airport	Saga	Kyūshū	HSG/RJFS		291,114	117,214	230,073	813,082	760,935	740,585	639,304	630,478	497,223	355,582	345,066	298,729	339,992	315,551	291,401	289,092	298,171	263,858	289,450	306,133	311,809	339,972	326,419
Okadama Airport	Sapporo	Hokkaidō	OKD/RJCO		287,935	195,287	171,737	277,425	263,119	250,884	205,297	175,908	173,471	149,567	136,464	117,451	205,007	327,658	357,236	372,622	375,182	370,242	380,605	352,086	323,046	319,586	336,076
Misawa Airport	Misawa	Tōhoku	MSJ/RJSM		279,605	128,990	127,317	309,527	291,339	236,126	246,635	252,616	242,013	254,343	229,616	262,820	262,816	258,849	269,061	306,866	322,716	337,511	341,885	387,833	555,722	583,492	588,019
Yamagata Airport	Yamagata	Tōhoku	GAJ/RJSC		265,657	135,151	133,422	366,678	339,738	305,577	262,474	223,111	187,743	117,941	119,097	222,397	162,769	177,782	191,920	206,647	197,212	210,154	216,565	243,445	282,854	344,874	379,356
Tottori Airport	Tottori	Chūgoku	TTJ/RJOR		242,440	117,754	142,693	417,740	402,240	400,576	376,322	366,925	335,333	324,808	297,525	277,136	305,381	293,409	314,066	332,592	339,228	337,202	354,009	324,426	321,720	337,933	357,738
Shonai Airport	Shōnai	Tōhoku	SYO/RJSY		234,372	105,477	147,183	442,566	395,858	398,400	386,178	364,815	368,618	350,172	355,583	354,003	355,849	342,131	403,346	419,300	426,448	409,207	422,517	394,869	379,800	425,350	428,201
Toyama Airport	Toyama	Chūbu	TOY/RJNT		214,215	81,172	147,987	575,172	563,073	574,950	589,249	736,740	994,134	954,639	942,094	877,446	949,159	952,490	1,155,926	1,260,898	1,303,471	1,356,478	1,380,660	1,353,768	1,302,766	1,164,138	1,162,172

== 2022 final statistics ==
The 50 busiest airports in Japan in 2022 ordered by total passenger traffic, according to the MLIT reports.

Rank	Airport	City served	Region	IATA/ ICAO	Traffic		Aircraft		Cargo	
Rank	Airport	City served	Region	IATA/ ICAO	Passengers	% chg. 2021/22	Movements	% chg. 2021/22	Tonnes	% chg. 2021/22
1	Haneda Airport	Tōkyō	Kantō	HND/RJTT	50,427,921	▲89.9	388,100	▲41.5	857,387	▼4.0
2	New Chitose Airport	Sapporo	Hokkaidō	CTS/RJCC	15,227,741	▲84.9	128,230	▲46.3	131,606	▲0.4
3	Fukuoka Airport	Fukuoka	Kyūshū	FUK/RJFF	14,824,614	▲74.9	146,934	▲36.1	157,814	▲2.3
4	Naha Airport	Naha	Okinawa	OKA/ROAH	13,765,285	▲85.6	139,614	▲23.8	191,714	▲6.0
5	Narita International Airport	Tōkyō	Kantō	NRT/RJAA	13,754,290	▲186.6	166,510	▲27.2	2,399,297	▼9.2
6	Osaka International Airport	Ōsaka	Kansai	ITM/RJOO	11,528,144	▲70.3	133,666	▲43.0	96,223	▲8.9
7	Kansai International Airport	Ōsaka	Kansai	KIX/RJBB	7,939,885	▲158.9	93,656	▲40.6	815,961	▼3.3
8	Chubu Centrair International Airport	Nagoya	Chūbu	NGO/RJGG	4,970,336	▲95.6	65,028	▲34.1	131,816	▲1.7
9	Kagoshima Airport	Kagoshima	Kyūshū	KOJ/RJFK	4,064,791	▲67.3	62,852	▲26.5	18,558	▲21.2
10	Kobe Airport	Kōbe	Kansai	UKB/RJBE	2,701,449	▲66.2	33,270	▲18.1	0	Steady
11	Sendai Airport	Sendai	Tōhoku	SDJ/RJSS	2,529,942	▲68.9	52,368	▲24.5	1,965	▲8.3
12	Kumamoto Airport	Kumamoto	Kyūshū	KMJ/RJFT	2,263,376	▲92.2	42,148	▲29.6	8,280	▲51.9
13	Nagasaki Airport	Nagasaki	Kyūshū	NGS/RJFU	2,231,184	▲95.6	30,294	▲38.1	4,962	▲41.4
14	Miyazaki Airport	Miyazaki	Kyūshū	KMI/RJFM	2,226,599	▲80.4	41,580	▲42.1	5,493	▲1.3
15	Ishigaki Airport	Ishigaki	Okinawa	ISG/ROIG	2,157,356	▲66.0	25,920	▲28.0	17,583	▲12.5
16	Matsuyama Airport	Matsuyama	Shikoku	MYJ/RJOM	1,928,859	▲91.9	27,350	▲46.3	3,631	▲23.1
17	Hiroshima Airport	Hiroshima	Chūgoku	HIJ/RJOA	1,716,694	▲94.5	19,124	▲45.5	7,937	▲28.7
18	Miyako Airport	Miyako-jima	Okinawa	MMY/ROMY	1,364,403	▲62.3	17,418	▲29.2	15,539	▲8.4
19	Oita Airport	Ōita	Kyūshū	OIT/RJFO	1,293,492	▲75.5	27,008	▲49.5	4,631	▲28.6
20	Hakodate Airport	Hakodate	Hokkaidō	HKD/RJCH	1,252,568	▲81.7	15,396	▲16.0	4,204	▲12.1
21	Takamatsu Airport	Takamatsu	Shikoku	TAK/RJOT	1,161,834	▲109.0	16,998	▲48.1	2,120	▲10.9
22	Kōchi Airport	Kōchi, Kōchi	Shikoku	KCZ/RJOK	1,149,367	▲80.2	18,962	▲48.0	2,131	▲7.0
23	Komatsu Airport	Komatsu	Chūbu	KMQ/RJNK	985,302	▲111.2	11,988	▲60.1	6,839	▲8.3
24	Aomori Airport	Aomori	Tōhoku	AOJ/RJSA	887,053	▲103.8	16,186	▲40.6	1,146	▲15.8
25	Akita Airport	Akita	Tōhoku	AXT/RJSK	840,619	▲128.9	16,470	▲56.3	479	▼7.0
26	Asahikawa Airport	Asahikawa	Hokkaidō	AKJ/RJEC	766,453	▲97.0	5,486	▲28.7	4,468	▲63.1
27	Nagoya Airfield	Nagoya	Chūbu	NKM/RJNA	759,445	▲68.0	40,394	▲10.2	0	Steady
28	Okayama Airport	Okayama	Chūgoku	OKJ/RJOB	751,518	▲121.6	8,826	▲52.6	3,219	▲27.0
29	Amami Airport	Amami	Kyūshū	ASJ/RJKA	738,430	▲26.3	15,192	▲8.5	767	▼5.3
30	Kitakyushu Airport	Kitakyūshū	Kyūshū	KKJ/RJFR	737,335	▲68.7	15,642	▲31.5	19,077	▼10.8
31	Izumo Airport	Izumo	Chūgoku	IZO/RJOC	735,674	▲90.0	12,696	▲29.0	348	▼2.5
32	Tokushima Airport	Tokushima	Shikoku	TKS/RJOS	720,265	▲109.4	8,942	▲54.9	1,211	▲17.1
33	Niigata Airport	Niigata	Chūbu	KIJ/RJSN	698,062	▲100.6	23,556	▲36.9	169	▲50.9
34	Memanbetsu Airport	Ōzora	Hokkaidō	MMB/RJCM	663,051	▲62.0	11,312	▲39.2	1,024	▲5.5
35	Kushiro Airport	Kushiro	Hokkaidō	KUH/RJCK	630,435	▲59.8	10,424	▲28.8	1,472	▲47.1
36	Yamaguchi Ube Airport	Yamaguchi/Ube	Chūgoku	UBJ/RJDC	610,168	▲86.9	7,888	▲45.1	1,777	▲4.6
37	Ibaraki Airport	Tōkyō	Kantō	IBR/RJAH	494,515	▲91.9	5,098	▲53.0	0	Steady
38	Obihiro Airport	Obihiro	Hokkaidō	OBO/RJCB	489,897	▲90.6	15,070	▲15.7	2,714	▲233.4
39	Hanamaki Airport	Hanamaki	Tōhoku	HNA/RJSI	353,349	▲94.6	10,916	▲38.4	225	▲13.6
40	Miho-Yonago Airport	Yonago	Chūgoku	YGJ/RJOH	340,970	▲99.4	4,800	▲67.2	1,270	▲37.2
41	Shizuoka Airport	Shizuoka	Chūbu	FSZ/RJNS	328,296	▲96.8	8,864	▲38.9	12	▲500.0
42	Shimojishima Airport	Shimojishima	Okinawa	SHI/RORS	319,684	▲57.3	3,650	▲13.5	411	▲191.5
43	Marine Corps Air Station Iwakuni	Iwakuni	Chūgoku	IWK/RJOI	292,863	▲166.2	3,844	▲363.1	424	▲104.0
44	Saga Airport	Saga	Kyūshū	HSG/RJFS	291,114	▲148.4	7,662	▲191.2	562	▼10.2
45	Okadama Airport	Sapporo	Hokkaidō	OKD/RJCO	287,935	▲47.4	15,122	▲1.3	0	Steady
46	Misawa Airport	Misawa	Tōhoku	MSJ/RJSM	279,605	▲116.8	3,856	▲38.9	1,128	▲25.4
47	Yamagata Airport	Yamagata	Tōhoku	GAJ/RJSC	265,657	▲96.6	7,452	▲28.7	0	Steady
48	Tottori Airport	Tottori	Chūgoku	TTJ/RJOR	242,440	▲105.9	5,346	▲60.9	312	▲1.2
49	Shonai Airport	Shōnai	Tōhoku	SYO/RJSY	234,372	▲122.2	3,922	▲206.9	393	▲31.0
50	Toyama Airport	Toyama	Chūbu	TOY/RJNT	214,215	▲163.9	5,920	▲169.5	435	▲55.8
Top 50 Total					175,438,852	▲91.4	1,998,950	▲34.5	4,928,734	▼5.1
Total					178,627,605	▲90.9	2,199,294	▲32.3	4,933,913	▼5.0

== 2021 final statistics ==
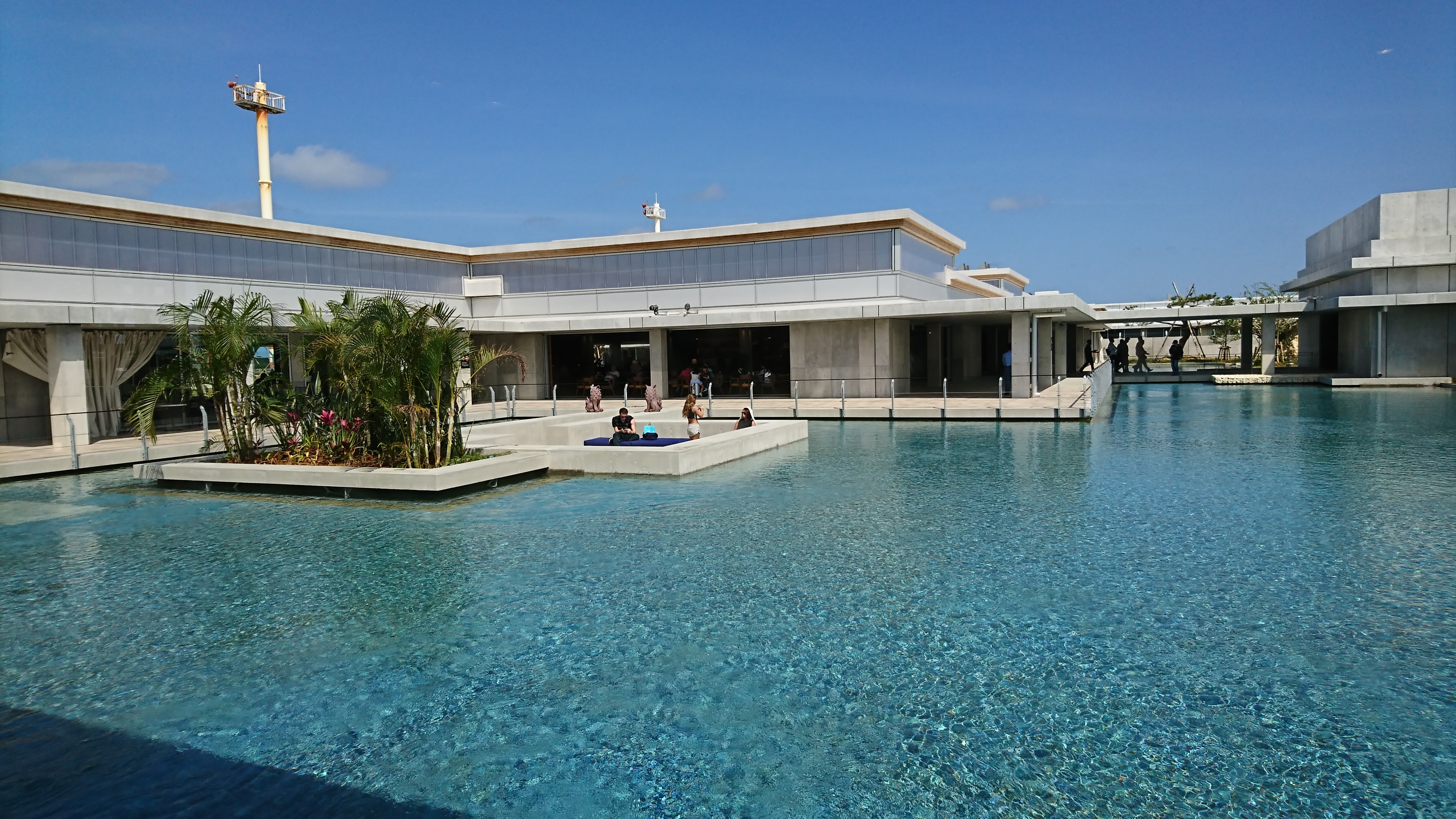
Because of the significant influence of COVID-19 pandemic restrictions, some small airports have entered the race in between the busiest airports in Japan, like Shimojishima Airport.

The 50 busiest airports in Japan in 2021 ordered by total passenger traffic, according to the MLIT reports.

Rank	Airport	City served	Region	IATA/ ICAO	Passengers	Aircraft	Cargo
1.	Haneda Airport	Tōkyō	Kantō	HND/RJTT	26,557,863	274,248	892,878
2.	Fukuoka Airport	Fukuoka	Kyūshū	FUK/RJFF	8,475,937	107,934	154,263
3.	New Chitose Airport	Sapporo	Hokkaidō	CTS/RJCC	8,233,438	87,628	131,020
4.	Naha Airport	Naha	Okinawa	OKA/ROAH	7,415,492	112,770	180,783
5.	Osaka International Airport	Ōsaka	Kansai	ITM/RJOO	6,770,089	93,480	88,337
6.	Narita International Airport	Tōkyō	Kantō	NRT/RJAA	4,799,393	130,866	2,643,671
7.	Kansai International Airport	Ōsaka	Kansai	KIX/RJBB	3,067,278	66,632	843,655
8.	Chubu Centrair International Airport	Nagoya	Chūbu	NGO/RJGG	2,541,682	48,504	129,640
9.	Kagoshima Airport	Kagoshima	Kyūshū	KOJ/RJFK	2,429,810	49,680	15,308
10.	Kobe Airport	Kōbe	Kansai	UKB/RJBE	1,625,715	28,166	0
11.	Sendai Airport	Sendai	Tōhoku	SDJ/RJSS	1,497,738	42,074	1,814
12.	Ishigaki Airport	Ishigaki	Okinawa	ISG/ROIG	1,299,773	20,256	15,623
13.	Miyazaki Airport	Miyazaki	Kyūshū	KMI/RJFM	1,234,579	29,252	5,424
14.	Kumamoto Airport	Kumamoto	Kyūshū	KMJ/RJFT	1,177,315	32,530	5,451
15.	Nagasaki Airport	Nagasaki	Kyūshū	NGS/RJFU	1,140,929	21,938	3,510
16.	Matsuyama Airport	Matsuyama	Shikoku	MYJ/RJOM	1,005,333	18,700	2,950
17.	Hiroshima Airport	Hiroshima	Chūgoku	HIJ/RJOA	882,590	13,140	6,167
18.	Miyako Airport	Miyako-jima	Okinawa	MMY/ROMY	840,652	13,486	14,340
19.	Oita Airport	Ōita	Kyūshū	OIT/RJFO	737,104	18,068	3,600
20.	Hakodate Airport	Hakodate	Hokkaidō	HKD/RJCH	689,395	13,276	3,749
21.	Kōchi Airport	Kōchi, Kōchi	Shikoku	KCZ/RJOK	637,693	12,810	1,992
22.	Amami Airport	Amami	Kyūshū	ASJ/RJKA	584,658	14,006	810
23.	Takamatsu Airport	Takamatsu	Shikoku	TAK/RJOT	555,911	11,478	1,911
24.	Komatsu Airport	Komatsu	Chūbu	KMQ/RJNK	466,597	7,486	6,316
25.	Nagoya Airfield	Nagoya	Chūbu	NKM/RJNA	451,961	36,660	0
26.	Kitakyushu Airport	Kitakyūshū	Kyūshū	KKJ/RJFR	437,055	11,894	21,376
27.	Aomori Airport	Aomori	Tōhoku	AOJ/RJSA	435,237	11,508	990
28.	Memanbetsu Airport	Ōzora	Hokkaidō	MMB/RJCM	409,410	8,124	971
29.	Kushiro Airport	Kushiro	Hokkaidō	KUH/RJCK	394,469	8,094	1,001
30.	Asahikawa Airport	Asahikawa	Hokkaidō	AKJ/RJEC	388,978	4,264	2,739
31.	Izumo Airport	Izumo	Chūgoku	IZO/RJOC	387,281	9,844	357
32.	Okayama Airport	Okayama	Chūgoku	OKJ/RJOB	339,092	5,782	2,535
33.	Akita Airport	Akita	Tōhoku	AXT/RJSK	367,178	10,540	515
34.	Tokushima Airport	Tokushima	Shikoku	TKS/RJOS	343,905	5,772	1,034
35.	Niigata Airport	Niigata	Chūbu	KIJ/RJSN	347,941	17,210	112
36.	Yamaguchi Ube Airport	Yamaguchi/Ube	Chūgoku	UBJ/RJDC	326,545	5,438	1,699
37.	Ibaraki Airport	Tōkyō	Kantō	IBR/RJAH	257,685	3,332	0
38.	Obihiro Airport	Obihiro	Hokkaidō	OBO/RJCB	257,011	13,028	814
39.	Shimojishima Airport	Shimojishima	Okinawa	SHI/RORS	203,214	3,216	141
40.	Okadama Airport	Sapporo	Hokkaidō	OKD/RJCO	195,287	14,930	0
41.	Hanamaki Airport	Hanamaki	Tōhoku	HNA/RJSI	181,589	7,886	198
42.	Miho-Yonago Airport	Yonago	Chūgoku	YGJ/RJOH	171,037	2,870	926
43.	Shizuoka Airport	Shizuoka	Chūbu	FSZ/RJNS	166,838	6,382	2
44.	Tsushima Airport	Tsushima	Kyūshū	TSJ/RJDT	164,959	5,086	177
45.	Tokunoshima Airport	Tokunoshima	Kyūshū	TKN/RJKN	142,448	5,654	237
46.	Kumejima Airport	Kumejima	Okinawa	UEO/ROKJ	138,065	4,068	1,408
47.	Yamagata Airport	Yamagata	Tōhoku	GAJ/RJSC	135,151	5,788	0
48.	Misawa Airport	Misawa	Tōhoku	MSJ/RJSM	128,990	2,776	899
49.	Nanki–Shirahama Airport	Shirahama	Kansai	SHM/RJBD	118,472	3,782	6
50.	Tottori Airport	Tottori	Chūgoku	TTJ/RJOR	117,754	3,322	308

== 2020 final statistics ==
The 50 busiest airports in Japan in 2020 ordered by total passenger traffic, according to the MLIT reports.

Rank	Airport	City served	Region	IATA/ ICAO	Passengers	Aircraft	Cargo
1.	Haneda Airport	Tōkyō	Kantō	HND/RJTT	32,101,879	279,644	841,152
2.	Narita International Airport	Tōkyō	Kantō	NRT/RJAA	9,812,184	137,554	2,016,531
3.	Fukuoka Airport	Fukuoka	Kyūshū	FUK/RJFF	9,583,882	112,242	158,731
4.	New Chitose Airport	Sapporo	Hokkaidō	CTS/RJCC	9,299,961	93,288	130,632
5.	Naha Airport	Naha	Okinawa	OKA/ROAH	9,210,360	113,722	195,543
6.	Osaka International Airport	Ōsaka	Kansai	ITM/RJOO	7,672,386	96,226	91,958
7.	Kansai International Airport	Ōsaka	Kansai	KIX/RJBB	6,533,895	83,400	733,195
8.	Chubu Centrair International Airport	Nagoya	Chūbu	NGO/RJGG	3,812,815	55,924	128,806
9.	Kagoshima Airport	Kagoshima	Kyūshū	KOJ/RJFK	2,576,230	50,048	17,717
10.	Kobe Airport	Kōbe	Kansai	UKB/RJBE	1,625,487	26,260	0
11.	Sendai Airport	Sendai	Tōhoku	SDJ/RJSS	1,621,148	41,838	3,014
12.	Ishigaki Airport	Ishigaki	Okinawa	ISG/ROIG	1,489,765	19,748	14,788
13.	Miyazaki Airport	Miyazaki	Kyūshū	KMI/RJFM	1,386,778	30,558	5,575
14.	Nagasaki Airport	Nagasaki	Kyūshū	NGS/RJFU	1,340,879	22,214	6,549
15.	Kumamoto Airport	Kumamoto	Kyūshū	KMJ/RJFT	1,309,876	32,172	9,304
16.	Matsuyama Airport	Matsuyama	Shikoku	MYJ/RJOM	1,196,596	20,810	4,130
17.	Hiroshima Airport	Hiroshima	Chūgoku	HIJ/RJOA	1,157,906	14,218	10,722
18.	Miyako Airport	Miyako-jima	Okinawa	MMY/ROMY	1,025,177	13,264	13,999
19.	Oita Airport	Ōita	Kyūshū	OIT/RJFO	812,674	15,900	4,658
20.	Hakodate Airport	Hakodate	Hokkaidō	HKD/RJCH	765,948	14,010	3,848
21.	Takamatsu Airport	Takamatsu	Shikoku	TAK/RJOT	712,077	12,492	3,355
22.	Kōchi Airport	Kōchi, Kōchi	Shikoku	KCZ/RJOK	704,492	13,876	2,175
23.	Komatsu Airport	Komatsu	Chūbu	KMQ/RJNK	644,230	9,788	6,926
24.	Kitakyushu Airport	Kitakyūshū	Kyūshū	KKJ/RJFR	560,408	12,256	12,906
25.	Amami Airport	Amami	Kyūshū	ASJ/RJKA	557,615	13,238	806
26.	Aomori Airport	Aomori	Tōhoku	AOJ/RJSA	485,652	11,510	1,446
27.	Okayama Airport	Okayama	Chūgoku	OKJ/RJOB	478,923	6,350	3,293
28.	Izumo Airport	Izumo	Chūgoku	IZO/RJOC	454,128	10,482	444
29.	Akita Airport	Akita	Tōhoku	AXT/RJSK	449,086	11,950	600
30.	Nagoya Airfield	Nagoya	Chūbu	NKM/RJNA	444,136	35,922	0
31.	Niigata Airport	Niigata	Chūbu	KIJ/RJSN	442,419	18,868	188
32.	Asahikawa Airport	Asahikawa	Hokkaidō	AKJ/RJEC	438,171	4,538	3,724
33.	Kushiro Airport	Kushiro	Hokkaidō	KUH/RJCK	429,528	8,738	1,382
34.	Tokushima Airport	Tokushima	Shikoku	TKS/RJOS	420,220	6,378	1,308
35.	Yamaguchi Ube Airport	Yamaguchi/Ube	Chūgoku	UBJ/RJDC	385,218	5,876	2,028
36.	Memanbetsu Airport	Ōzora	Hokkaidō	MMB/RJCM	377,364	6,498	1,066
37.	Ibaraki Airport	Tōkyō	Kantō	IBR/RJAH	313,533	3,868	0
38.	Obihiro Airport	Obihiro	Hokkaidō	OBO/RJCB	284,882	12,978	1,334
39.	Saga Airport	Saga	Kyūshū	HSG/RJFS	230,073	6,672	620
40.	Shizuoka Airport	Shizuoka	Chūbu	FSZ/RJNS	225,844	6,326	124
41.	Miho-Yonago Airport	Yonago	Chūgoku	YGJ/RJOH	219,807	3,498	1,103
42.	Hanamaki Airport	Hanamaki	Tōhoku	HNA/RJSI	199,584	7,460	202
43.	Tsushima Airport	Tsushima	Kyūshū	TSJ/RJDT	181,674	5,400	192
44.	Okadama Airport	Sapporo	Hokkaidō	OKD/RJCO	171,737	14,276	0
45.	Kumejima Airport	Kumejima	Okinawa	UEO/ROKJ	159,041	4,614	1,342
46.	Marine Corps Air Station Iwakuni	Iwakuni	Chūgoku	IWK/RJOI	156,092	2,214	387
47.	Toyama Airport	Toyama	Chūbu	TOY/RJNT	147,987	4,518	625
48.	Shonai Airport	Shōnai	Tōhoku	SYO/RJSY	147,183	3,052	484
49.	Tottori Airport	Tottori	Chūgoku	TTJ/RJOR	142,693	3,860	362
50.	Yamagata Airport	Yamagata	Tōhoku	GAJ/RJSC	133,422	5,582	0

== 2019 final statistics ==
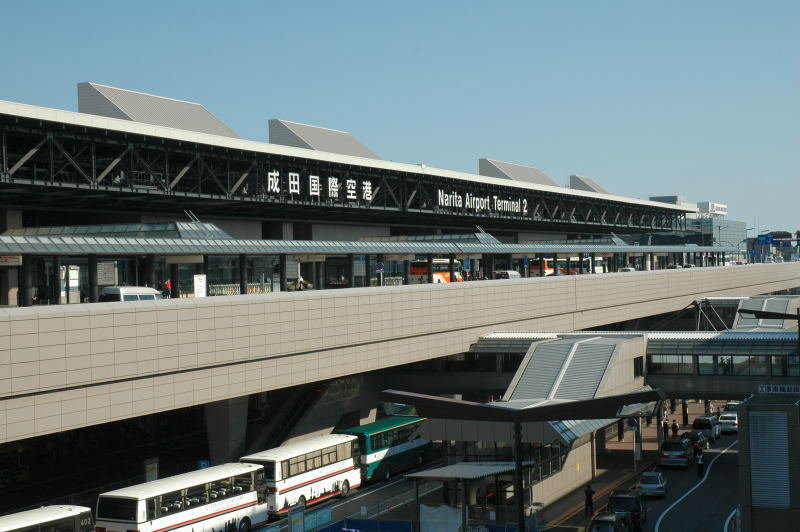
Narita International Airport received a tremendous blow with the COVID-19 pandemic, just after it reaches the best results ever in 2019.

The 50 busiest airports in Japan in 2019 ordered by total passenger traffic, according to the MLIT reports.

Rank	Airport	City served	Region	IATA/ ICAO	Passengers	Aircraft	Cargo
1.	Haneda Airport	Tōkyō	Kantō	HND/RJTT	87,406,105	458,368	1,294,516
2.	Narita International Airport	Tōkyō	Kantō	NRT/RJAA	42,413,928	265,252	2,104,064
3.	Kansai International Airport	Ōsaka	Kansai	KIX/RJBB	31,807,820	207,834	798,859
4.	Fukuoka Airport	Fukuoka	Kyūshū	FUK/RJFF	24,679,617	181,480	265,120
5.	New Chitose Airport	Sapporo	Hokkaidō	CTS/RJCC	24,599,263	158,734	184,418
6.	Naha Airport	Naha	Okinawa	OKA/ROAH	21,761,828	161,612	324,757
7.	Osaka International Airport	Ōsaka	Kansai	ITM/RJOO	16,504,209	138,444	129,125
8.	Chubu Centrair International Airport	Nagoya	Chūbu	NGO/RJGG	13,460,149	114,040	201,444
9.	Kagoshima Airport	Kagoshima	Kyūshū	KOJ/RJFK	6,075,210	69,220	28,153
10.	Sendai Airport	Sendai	Tōhoku	SDJ/RJSS	3,855,387	58,030	5,938
11.	Kumamoto Airport	Kumamoto	Kyūshū	KMJ/RJFT	3,492,188	43,480	17,129
12.	Miyazaki Airport	Miyazaki	Kyūshū	KMI/RJFM	3,410,361	43,586	7,795
13.	Kobe Airport	Kōbe	Kansai	UKB/RJBE	3,362,720	31,408	0
14.	Nagasaki Airport	Nagasaki	Kyūshū	NGS/RJFU	3,360,170	31,458	14,157
15.	Hiroshima Airport	Hiroshima	Chūgoku	HIJ/RJOA	3,166,572	25,000	18,733
16.	Matsuyama Airport	Matsuyama	Shikoku	MYJ/RJOM	3,152,419	31,054	7,992
17.	Ishigaki Airport	Ishigaki	Okinawa	ISG/ROIG	2,614,822	25,166	17,739
18.	Takamatsu Airport	Takamatsu	Shikoku	TAK/RJOT	2,152,430	19,320	6,165
19.	Oita Airport	Ōita	Kyūshū	OIT/RJFO	1,982,377	23,014	7,445
20.	Komatsu Airport	Komatsu	Chūbu	KMQ/RJNK	1,887,535	16,994	10,447
21.	Miyako Airport	Miyako-jima	Okinawa	MMY/ROMY	1,803,490	16,702	14,968
22.	Hakodate Airport	Hakodate	Hokkaidō	HKD/RJCH	1,800,577	18,112	6,950
23.	Kitakyushu Airport	Kitakyūshū	Kyūshū	KKJ/RJFR	1,753,525	19,626	8,594
24.	Kōchi Airport	Kōchi, Kōchi	Shikoku	KCZ/RJOK	1,656,279	19,672	3,224
25.	Okayama Airport	Okayama	Chūgoku	OKJ/RJOB	1,611,958	12,310	6,388
26.	Akita Airport	Akita	Tōhoku	AXT/RJSK	1,380,863	17,876	1,352
27.	Aomori Airport	Aomori	Tōhoku	AOJ/RJSA	1,253,791	17,020	2,322
28.	Tokushima Airport	Tokushima	Shikoku	TKS/RJOS	1,218,852	10,394	2,674
29.	Niigata Airport	Niigata	Chūbu	KIJ/RJSN	1,201,419	26,646	430
30.	Asahikawa Airport	Asahikawa	Hokkaidō	AKJ/RJEC	1,158,948	7,148	7,160
31.	Izumo Airport	Izumo	Chūgoku	IZO/RJOC	1,051,155	13,672	997
32.	Yamaguchi Ube Airport	Yamaguchi/Ube	Chūgoku	UBJ/RJDC	1,028,166	8,492	2,881
33.	Nagoya Airfield	Nagoya	Chūbu	NKM/RJNA	942,753	42,398	0
34.	Amami Airport	Amami	Kyūshū	ASJ/RJKA	891,990	16,202	1,036
35.	Kushiro Airport	Kushiro	Hokkaidō	KUH/RJCK	866,970	10,884	2,250
36.	Memanbetsu Airport	Ōzora	Hokkaidō	MMB/RJCM	860,458	9,280	1,570
37.	Ibaraki Airport	Tōkyō	Kantō	IBR/RJAH	822,208	6,420	256
38.	Saga Airport	Saga	Kyūshū	HSG/RJFS	813,082	10,614	990
39.	Shizuoka Airport	Shizuoka	Chūbu	FSZ/RJNS	805,195	11,404	1,231
40.	Obihiro Airport	Obihiro	Hokkaidō	OBO/RJCB	701,557	15,364	2,712
41.	Miho-Yonago Airport	Yonago	Chūgoku	YGJ/RJOH	692,137	6,156	1,913
42.	Toyama Airport	Toyama	Chūbu	TOY/RJNT	575,172	7,874	1,034
43.	Hanamaki Airport	Hanamaki	Tōhoku	HNA/RJSI	516,742	11,370	280
44.	Marine Corps Air Station Iwakuni	Iwakuni	Chūgoku	IWK/RJOI	513,750	4,342	553
45.	Shonai Airport	Shōnai	Tōhoku	SYO/RJSY	442,566	4,518	598
46.	Tottori Airport	Tottori	Chūgoku	TTJ/RJOR	417,740	5,218	579
47.	Yamagata Airport	Yamagata	Tōhoku	GAJ/RJSC	366,678	8,364	15
48.	Misawa Airport	Misawa	Tōhoku	MSJ/RJSM	309,527	3,630	1,114
49.	Fukushima Airport	Fukushima	Tōhoku	FKS/RJSF	282,437	9,008	151
50.	Okadama Airport	Sapporo	Hokkaidō	OKD/RJCO	277,425	16,776	1

== 2018 final statistics ==
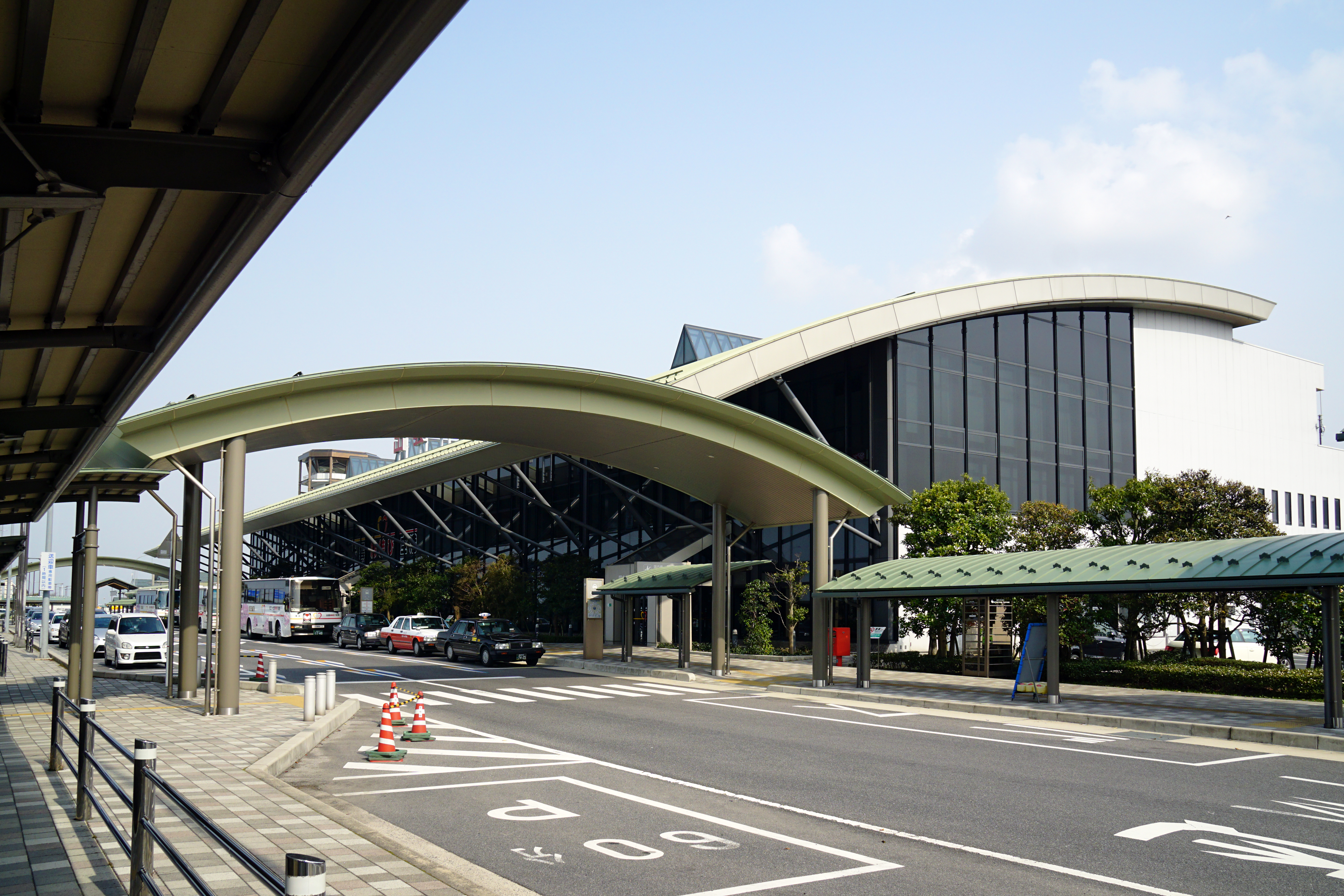
In 2018, 32 Japanese airports passed the one million passenger milestone for the first time, and Izumo Airport was the latest airport in reaching this achievement.

The 50 busiest airports in Japan in 2018 ordered by total passenger traffic, according to the MLIT reports.

Rank	Airport	City served	Region	IATA/ ICAO	Passengers	Aircraft	Cargo
1.	Haneda Airport	Tōkyō	Kantō	HND/RJTT	85,435,001	453,494	1,364,984
2.	Narita International Airport	Tōkyō	Kantō	NRT/RJAA	40,675,400	256,200	2,261,009
3.	Kansai International Airport	Ōsaka	Kansai	KIX/RJBB	28,859,727	187,118	856,165
4.	Fukuoka Airport	Fukuoka	Kyūshū	FUK/RJFF	24,639,104	180,104	264,492
5.	New Chitose Airport	Sapporo	Hokkaidō	CTS/RJCC	23,313,311	153,838	208,021
6.	Naha Airport	Naha	Okinawa	OKA/ROAH	21,382,843	163,606	353,545
7.	Osaka International Airport	Ōsaka	Kansai	ITM/RJOO	16,184,901	138,264	136,744
8.	Chubu Centrair International Airport	Nagoya	Chūbu	NGO/RJGG	12,029,572	101,772	220,592
9.	Kagoshima Airport	Kagoshima	Kyūshū	KOJ/RJFK	5,978,619	69,158	31,115
10.	Sendai Airport	Sendai	Tōhoku	SDJ/RJSS	3,579,675	55,064	6,258
11.	Kumamoto Airport	Kumamoto	Kyūshū	KMJ/RJFT	3,409,760	43,880	17,534
12.	Miyazaki Airport	Miyazaki	Kyūshū	KMI/RJFM	3,337,646	44,056	8,549
13.	Nagasaki Airport	Nagasaki	Kyūshū	NGS/RJFU	3,229,969	30,752	14,549
14.	Kobe Airport	Kōbe	Kansai	UKB/RJBE	3,181,700	29,186	0
15.	Matsuyama Airport	Matsuyama	Shikoku	MYJ/RJOM	3,138,693	31,320	8,704
16.	Hiroshima Airport	Hiroshima	Chūgoku	HIJ/RJOA	2,958,430	24,494	19,288
17.	Ishigaki Airport	Ishigaki	Okinawa	ISG/ROIG	2,557,269	25,278	18,980
18.	Takamatsu Airport	Takamatsu	Shikoku	TAK/RJOT	2,042,504	18,702	6,346
19.	Oita Airport	Ōita	Kyūshū	OIT/RJFO	1,978,483	23,632	8,498
20.	Komatsu Airport	Komatsu	Chūbu	KMQ/RJNK	1,766,998	16,502	19,596
21.	Hakodate Airport	Hakodate	Hokkaidō	HKD/RJCH	1,763,710	18,594	7,227
22.	Miyako Airport	Miyako-jima	Okinawa	MMY/ROMY	1,759,808	17,046	15,488
23.	Kitakyushu Airport	Kitakyūshū	Kyūshū	KKJ/RJFR	1,749,962	20,112	8,107
24.	Okayama Airport	Okayama	Chūgoku	OKJ/RJOB	1,590,920	12,194	6,127
25.	Kōchi Airport	Kōchi, Kōchi	Shikoku	KCZ/RJOK	1,518,090	17,976	3,491
26.	Akita Airport	Akita	Tōhoku	AXT/RJSK	1,339,494	17,960	1,663
27.	Aomori Airport	Aomori	Tōhoku	AOJ/RJSA	1,192,156	16,586	2,435
28.	Tokushima Airport	Tokushima	Shikoku	TKS/RJOS	1,157,235	10,234	2,437
29.	Asahikawa Airport	Asahikawa	Hokkaidō	AKJ/RJEC	1,124,071	6,798	6,742
30.	Niigata Airport	Niigata	Chūbu	KIJ/RJSN	1,123,897	26,006	481
31.	Yamaguchi Ube Airport	Yamaguchi/Ube	Chūgoku	UBJ/RJDC	1,039,282	8,554	2,678
32.	Izumo Airport	Izumo	Chūgoku	IZO/RJOC	1,002,395	13,260	1,060
33.	Nagoya Airfield	Nagoya	Chūbu	NKM/RJNA	913,539	43,518	0
34.	Amami Airport	Amami	Kyūshū	ASJ/RJKA	848,783	15,720	1,092
35.	Memanbetsu Airport	Ōzora	Hokkaidō	MMB/RJCM	833,568	9,508	1,702
36.	Kushiro Airport	Kushiro	Hokkaidō	KUH/RJCK	775,019	10,456	2,463
37.	Saga Airport	Saga	Kyūshū	HSG/RJFS	760,935	10,638	2,882
38.	Ibaraki Airport	Tōkyō	Kantō	IBR/RJAH	733,397	5,866	323
39.	Shizuoka Airport	Shizuoka	Chūbu	FSZ/RJNS	717,363	9,444	1,073
40.	Obihiro Airport	Obihiro	Hokkaidō	OBO/RJCB	675,068	13,838	2,856
41.	Miho-Yonago Airport	Yonago	Chūgoku	YGJ/RJOH	674,989	6,584	1,938
42.	Toyama Airport	Toyama	Chūbu	TOY/RJNT	563,073	7,596	1,256
43.	Marine Corps Air Station Iwakuni	Iwakuni	Chūgoku	IWK/RJOI	519,643	4,332	607
44.	Hanamaki Airport	Hanamaki	Tōhoku	HNA/RJSI	478,125	11,134	291
45.	Tottori Airport	Tottori	Chūgoku	TTJ/RJOR	402,240	5,086	675
46.	Shonai Airport	Shōnai	Tōhoku	SYO/RJSY	395,858	4,156	522
47.	Yamagata Airport	Yamagata	Tōhoku	GAJ/RJSC	339,738	8,628	2
48.	Misawa Airport	Misawa	Tōhoku	MSJ/RJSM	291,339	3,642	916
49.	Fukushima Airport	Fukushima	Tōhoku	FKS/RJSF	268,381	8,702	137
50.	Kumejima Airport	Kumejima	Okinawa	UEO/ROKJ	263,278	5,316	1,709

== 2017 final statistics ==
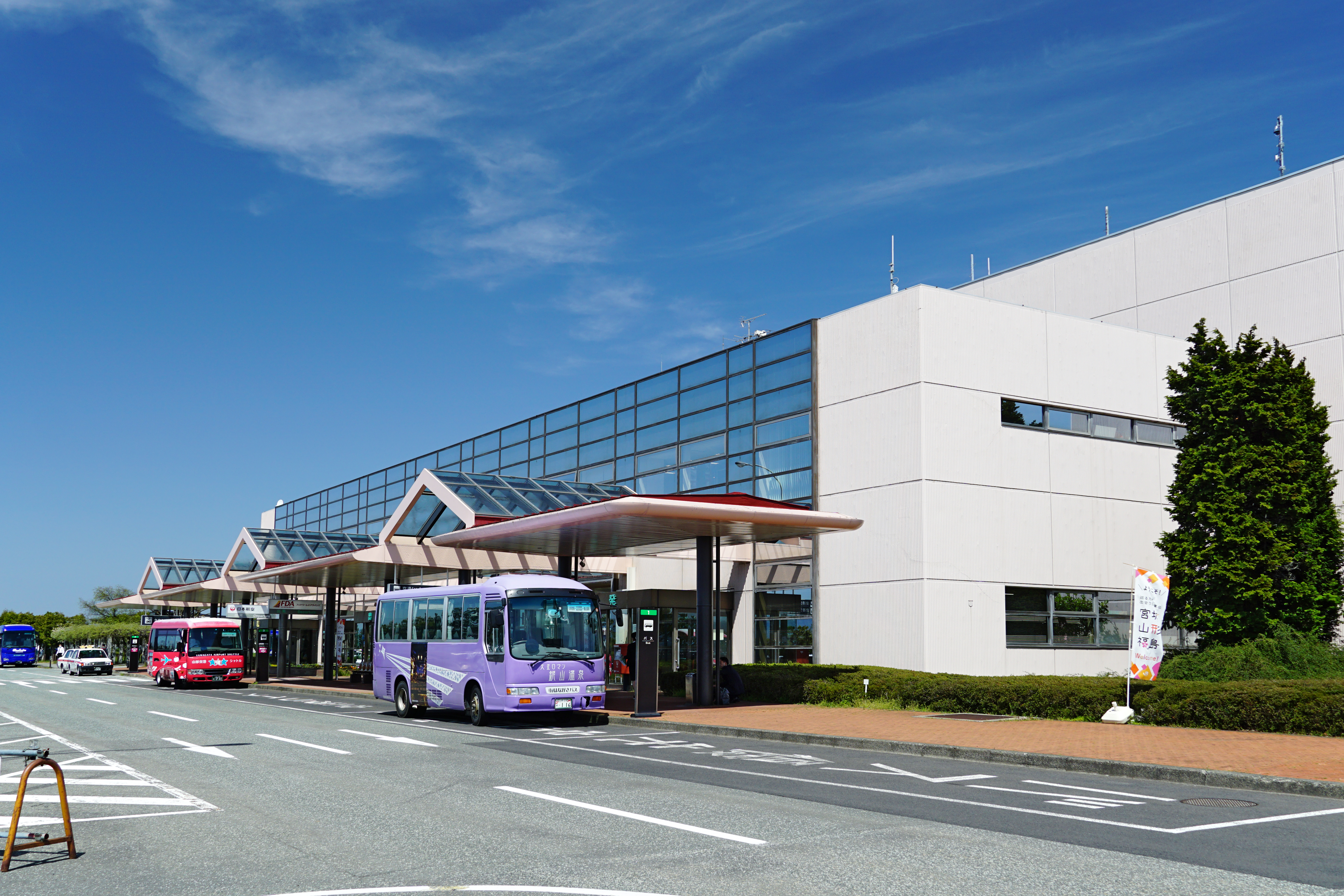
Yamagata Airport is the newest airfield entering the top 50 ranking, reporting steady growth and positioning itself as the 47th busiest airport in Japan in 2016.

The 50 busiest airports in Japan in 2017 ordered by total passenger traffic, according to the MLIT reports.

Rank	Airport	City served	Region	IATA/ ICAO	Passengers	Aircraft	Cargo
1.	Haneda Airport	Tōkyō	Kantō	HND/RJTT	83,565,476	453,126	1,378,354
2.	Narita International Airport	Tōkyō	Kantō	NRT/RJAA	38,631,558	252,940	2,336,429
3.	Kansai International Airport	Ōsaka	Kansai	KIX/RJBB	27,886,816	185,176	865,328
4.	Fukuoka Airport	Fukuoka	Kyūshū	FUK/RJFF	23,796,849	178,188	274,470
5.	New Chitose Airport	Sapporo	Hokkaidō	CTS/RJCC	22,718,612	150,620	216,812
6.	Naha Airport	Naha	Okinawa	OKA/ROAH	20,973,087	166,498	434,779
7.	Osaka International Airport	Ōsaka	Kansai	ITM/RJOO	15,597,777	138,456	141,242
8.	Chubu Centrair International Airport	Nagoya	Chūbu	NGO/RJGG	11,446,244	101,292	207,287
9.	Kagoshima Airport	Kagoshima	Kyūshū	KOJ/RJFK	5,617,997	66,842	31,688
10.	Sendai Airport	Sendai	Tōhoku	SDJ/RJSS	3,370,493	51,536	6,770
11.	Kumamoto Airport	Kumamoto	Kyūshū	KMJ/RJFT	3,303,242	42,142	18,942
12.	Miyazaki Airport	Miyazaki	Kyūshū	KMI/RJFM	3,170,368	42,696	9,357
13.	Nagasaki Airport	Nagasaki	Kyūshū	NGS/RJFU	3,165,385	31,480	14,567
14.	Kobe Airport	Kōbe	Kansai	UKB/RJBE	3,109,042	27,570	0
15.	Matsuyama Airport	Matsuyama	Shikoku	MYJ/RJOM	3,028,693	30,642	7,754
16.	Hiroshima Airport	Hiroshima	Chūgoku	HIJ/RJOA	2,975,385	24,020	19,792
17.	Ishigaki Airport	Ishigaki	Okinawa	ISG/ROIG	2,505,886	25,032	20,154
18.	Takamatsu Airport	Takamatsu	Shikoku	TAK/RJOT	1,998,087	18,874	6,377
19.	Oita Airport	Ōita	Kyūshū	OIT/RJFO	1,900,229	22,812	7,718
20.	Hakodate Airport	Hakodate	Hokkaidō	HKD/RJCH	1,791,083	18,872	8,133
21.	Komatsu Airport	Komatsu	Chūbu	KMQ/RJNK	1,779,221	16,492	19,434
22.	Miyako Airport	Miyako-jima	Okinawa	MMY/ROMY	1,664,038	17,488	15,879
23.	Kitakyushu Airport	Kitakyūshū	Kyūshū	KKJ/RJFR	1,638,783	18,588	5,557
24.	Okayama Airport	Okayama	Chūgoku	OKJ/RJOB	1,524,217	12,096	5,260
25.	Kōchi Airport	Kōchi, Kōchi	Shikoku	KCZ/RJOK	1,478,110	17,590	3,440
26.	Akita Airport	Akita	Tōhoku	AXT/RJSK	1,322,221	18,436	1,802
27.	Aomori Airport	Aomori	Tōhoku	AOJ/RJSA	1,167,436	16,942	2,611
28.	Asahikawa Airport	Asahikawa	Hokkaidō	AKJ/RJEC	1,122,505	7,170	7,025
29.	Tokushima Airport	Tokushima	Shikoku	TKS/RJOS	1,113,367	9,766	2,328
30.	Niigata Airport	Niigata	Chūbu	KIJ/RJSN	1,016,991	25,678	577
31.	Yamaguchi Ube Airport	Yamaguchi/Ube	Chūgoku	UBJ/RJDC	1,008,048	8,590	2,544
32.	Izumo Airport	Izumo	Chūgoku	IZO/RJOC	940,426	13,026	1,023
33.	Nagoya Airfield	Nagoya	Chūbu	NKM/RJNA	902,066	44,380	0
34.	Memanbetsu Airport	Ōzora	Hokkaidō	MMB/RJCM	824,715	9,446	1,863
35.	Amami Airport	Amami	Kyūshū	ASJ/RJKA	760,241	14,994	1,049
36.	Kushiro Airport	Kushiro	Hokkaidō	KUH/RJCK	742,279	10,520	2,457
37.	Saga Airport	Saga	Kyūshū	HSG/RJFS	740,585	10,522	4,669
38.	Shizuoka Airport	Shizuoka	Chūbu	FSZ/RJNS	671,582	9,174	929
39.	Obihiro Airport	Obihiro	Hokkaidō	OBO/RJCB	669,361	14,788	2,893
40.	Miho-Yonago Airport	Yonago	Chūgoku	YGJ/RJOH	658,823	6,080	1,872
41.	Ibaraki Airport	Tōkyō	Kantō	IBR/RJAH	655,668	5,350	317
42.	Toyama Airport	Toyama	Chūbu	TOY/RJNT	574,950	7,744	1,459
43.	Marine Corps Air Station Iwakuni	Iwakuni	Chūgoku	IWK/RJOI	483,004	4,182	490
44.	Hanamaki Airport	Hanamaki	Tōhoku	HNA/RJSI	432,507	10,906	277
45.	Tottori Airport	Tottori	Chūgoku	TTJ/RJOR	400,576	5,558	647
46.	Shonai Airport	Shōnai	Tōhoku	SYO/RJSY	398,400	4,136	564
47.	Yamagata Airport	Yamagata	Tōhoku	GAJ/RJSC	305,577	7,982	16
48.	Kumejima Airport	Kumejima	Okinawa	UEO/ROKJ	259,837	5,428	1,750
49.	Fukushima Airport	Fukushima	Tōhoku	FKS/RJSF	254,199	7,958	111
50.	Okadama Airport	Sapporo	Hokkaidō	OKD/RJCO	250,884	15,304	1

== 2016 final statistics ==
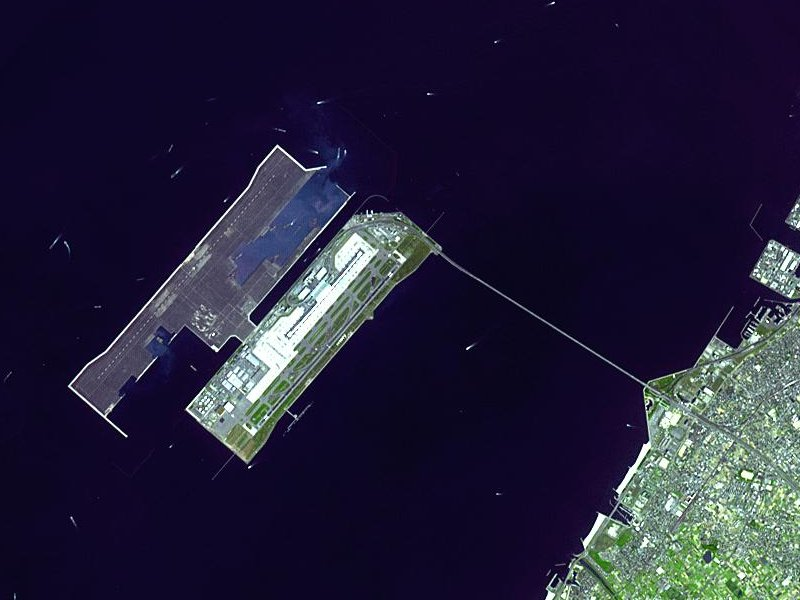
Kansai International Airport, one of the busiest airports by international passenger traffic in Asia, reached the third place at the ranking of the busiest Japanese airports in 2015.

The 50 busiest airports in Japan in 2016 ordered by total passenger traffic, according to the MLIT reports.

Rank	Airport	City served	Region	IATA/ ICAO	Passengers	Aircraft	Cargo
1.	Haneda Airport	Tōkyō	Kantō	HND/RJTT	79,232,438	448,458	1,237,931
2.	Narita International Airport	Tōkyō/Narita	Kantō	NRT/RJAA	36,578,845	244,752	2,165,428
3.	Kansai International Airport	Ōsaka	Kansai	KIX/RJBB	25,130,556	177,106	755,376
4.	Fukuoka Airport	Fukuoka	Kyūshū	FUK/RJFF	21,994,977	176,170	270,138
5.	New Chitose Airport	Sapporo/Chitose	Hokkaidō	CTS/RJCC	21,311,918	144,192	221,730
6.	Naha Airport	Naha	Okinawa	OKA/ROAH	19,671,854	165,780	421,201
7.	Osaka International Airport	Ōsaka	Kansai	ITM/RJOO	14,923,678	139,192	142,835
8.	Chubu Centrair International Airport	Nagoya	Chūbu	NGO/RJGG	10,843,122	101,718	195,083
9.	Kagoshima Airport	Kagoshima	Kyūshū	KOJ/RJFK	5,372,961	66,078	31,871
10.	Sendai Airport	Sendai	Tōhoku	SDJ/RJSS	3,110,363	49,760	7,378
11.	Miyazaki Airport	Miyazaki	Kyūshū	KMI/RJFM	3,074,788	42,420	9,456
12.	Kumamoto Airport	Kumamoto	Kyūshū	KMJ/RJFT	2,986,686	41,718	17,812
13.	Nagasaki Airport	Nagasaki	Kyūshū	NGS/RJFU	2,967,421	30,190	14,641
14.	Matsuyama Airport	Matsuyama	Shikoku	MYJ/RJOM	2,894,786	29,868	8,129
15.	Hiroshima Airport	Hiroshima	Chūgoku	HIJ/RJOA	2,851,436	23,992	20,005
16.	Kobe Airport	Kōbe	Kansai	UKB/RJBE	2,697,927	24,910	0
17.	Ishigaki Airport	Ishigaki	Okinawa	ISG/ROIG	2,421,529	25,326	19,327
18.	Takamatsu Airport	Takamatsu	Shikoku	TAK/RJOT	1,844,518	17,818	6,019
19.	Oita Airport	Ōita	Kyūshū	OIT/RJFO	1,812,639	22,344	8,788
20.	Hakodate Airport	Hakodate	Hokkaidō	HKD/RJCH	1,744,682	18,226	8,980
21.	Komatsu Airport	Komatsu	Chūbu	KMQ/RJNK	1,705,320	16,672	17,330
22.	Miyako Airport	Miyako-jima	Okinawa	MMY/ROMY	1,530,294	17,904	15,160
23.	Okayama Airport	Okayama	Chūgoku	OKJ/RJOB	1,437,121	11,376	5,075
24.	Kōchi Airport	Kōchi, Kōchi	Shikoku	KCZ/RJOK	1,408,326	17,878	3,800
25.	Kitakyushu Airport	Kitakyūshū	Kyūshū	KKJ/RJFR	1,330,777	17,276	8,787
26.	Akita Airport	Akita	Tōhoku	AXT/RJSK	1,233,827	18,408	1,808
27.	Asahikawa Airport	Asahikawa	Hokkaidō	AKJ/RJEC	1,140,822	7,888	7,115
28.	Aomori Airport	Aomori	Tōhoku	AOJ/RJSA	1,072,554	16,402	2,620
29.	Tokushima Airport	Tokushima	Shikoku	TKS/RJOS	1,059,428	9,730	2,425
30.	Niigata Airport	Niigata	Chūbu	KIJ/RJSN	993,148	26,786	646
31.	Yamaguchi Ube Airport	Yamaguchi/Ube	Chūgoku	UBJ/RJDC	945,021	8,600	2,593
32.	Izumo Airport	Izumo	Chūgoku	IZO/RJOC	897,181	12,458	1,030
33.	Nagoya Airfield	Nagoya	Chūbu	NKM/RJNA	870,082	43,868	0
34.	Memanbetsu Airport	Ōzora	Hokkaidō	MMB/RJCM	768,990	9,892	1,743
35.	Kushiro Airport	Kushiro	Hokkaidō	KUH/RJCK	715,737	10,314	2,701
36.	Amami Airport	Amami	Kyūshū	ASJ/RJKA	695,804	14,930	1,174
37.	Saga Airport	Saga	Kyūshū	HSG/RJFS	639,304	10,150	4,216
38.	Obihiro Airport	Obihiro	Hokkaidō	OBO/RJCB	621,100	13,008	3,049
39.	Miho-Yonago Airport	Yonago	Chūgoku	YGJ/RJOH	616,910	6,390	1,931
40.	Shizuoka Airport	Shizuoka	Chūbu	FSZ/RJNS	616,384	9,420	576
41.	Ibaraki Airport	Tōkyō	Kantō	IBR/RJAH	605,944	5,012	304
42.	Toyama Airport	Toyama	Chūbu	TOY/RJNT	589,249	8,116	1,376
43.	Marine Corps Air Station Iwakuni	Iwakuni	Chūgoku	IWK/RJOI	435,423	3,910	239
44.	Hanamaki Airport	Hanamaki	Tōhoku	HNA/RJSI	421,825	11,902	230
45.	Shonai Airport	Shōnai	Tōhoku	SYO/RJSY	386,178	4,366	501
46.	Tottori Airport	Tottori	Chūgoku	TTJ/RJOR	376,322	5,036	522
47.	Yamagata Airport	Yamagata	Tōhoku	GAJ/RJSC	262,474	7,144	21
48.	Kumejima Airport	Kumejima	Okinawa	UEO/ROKJ	254,949	5,750	1,488
49.	Fukushima Airport	Fukushima	Tōhoku	FKS/RJSF	249,568	7,504	157
50.	Misawa Airport	Misawa	Tōhoku	MSJ/RJSM	246,635	3,400	959

== 2015 final statistics ==
The 50 busiest airports in Japan in 2015 ordered by total passenger traffic, according to the MLIT reports.

Rank	Airport	City served	Region	IATA/ ICAO	Passengers	Aircraft	Cargo
1.	Haneda Airport	Tōkyō	Kantō	HND/RJTT	75,741,306	438,542	1,173,752
2.	Narita International Airport	Tōkyō	Kantō	NRT/RJAA	34,751,221	233,500	2,122,318
3.	Kansai International Airport	Ōsaka	Kansai	KIX/RJBB	23,136,223	163,506	745,606
4.	Fukuoka Airport	Fukuoka	Kyūshū	FUK/RJFF	20,968,463	172,964	262,481
5.	New Chitose Airport	Sapporo	Hokkaidō	CTS/RJCC	20,461,531	140,620	228,054
6.	Naha Airport	Naha	Okinawa	OKA/ROAH	18,336,030	155,120	414,530
7.	Osaka International Airport	Ōsaka	Kansai	ITM/RJOO	14,541,936	139,450	140,688
8.	Chubu Centrair International Airport	Nagoya	Chūbu	NGO/RJGG	10,177,713	95,416	208,110
9.	Kagoshima Airport	Kagoshima	Kyūshū	KOJ/RJFK	5,220,710	66,730	32,623
10.	Kumamoto Airport	Kumamoto	Kyūshū	KMJ/RJFT	3,241,633	41,826	18,594
11.	Sendai Airport	Sendai	Tōhoku	SDJ/RJSS	3,152,569	51,470	7,232
12.	Nagasaki Airport	Nagasaki	Kyūshū	NGS/RJFU	3,110,686	31,912	16,233
13.	Miyazaki Airport	Miyazaki	Kyūshū	KMI/RJFM	2,976,563	41,814	9,957
14.	Matsuyama Airport	Matsuyama	Shikoku	MYJ/RJOM	2,863,239	31,010	8,181
15.	Hiroshima Airport	Hiroshima	Chūgoku	HIJ/RJOA	2,669,210	23,218	20,487
16.	Kobe Airport	Kōbe	Kansai	UKB/RJBE	2,435,110	27,514	0
17.	Ishigaki Airport	Ishigaki	Okinawa	ISG/ROIG	2,308,065	24,794	19,095
18.	Oita Airport	Ōita	Kyūshū	OIT/RJFO	1,849,834	21,666	9,288
19.	Komatsu Airport	Komatsu	Chūbu	KMQ/RJNK	1,844,117	17,832	15,309
20.	Takamatsu Airport	Takamatsu	Shikoku	TAK/RJOT	1,809,820	18,004	7,395
21.	Hakodate Airport	Hakodate	Hokkaidō	HKD/RJCH	1,772,052	17,996	9,546
22.	Okayama Airport	Okayama	Chūgoku	OKJ/RJOB	1,391,723	11,516	5,704
23.	Kōchi Airport	Kōchi, Kōchi	Shikoku	KCZ/RJOK	1,350,930	18,262	3,948
24.	Miyako Airport	Miyako-jima	Okinawa	MMY/ROMY	1,335,697	15,466	14,480
25.	Kitakyushu Airport	Kitakyūshū	Kyūshū	KKJ/RJFR	1,317,504	17,512	7,922
26.	Akita Airport	Akita	Tōhoku	AXT/RJSK	1,238,082	19,028	2,167
27.	Asahikawa Airport	Asahikawa	Hokkaidō	AKJ/RJEC	1,148,825	7,980	6,810
28.	Tokushima Airport	Tokushima	Shikoku	TKS/RJOS	1,000,121	10,906	2,524
29.	Aomori Airport	Aomori	Tōhoku	AOJ/RJSA	992,696	16,330	2,712
30.	Niigata Airport	Niigata	Chūbu	KIJ/RJSN	984,629	26,422	640
31.	Yamaguchi Ube Airport	Yamaguchi/Ube	Chūgoku	UBJ/RJDC	918,238	8,602	2,747
32.	Izumo Airport	Izumo	Chūgoku	IZO/RJOC	832,825	11,916	1,073
33.	Memanbetsu Airport	Ōzora	Hokkaidō	MMB/RJCM	757,103	10,156	1,629
34.	Toyama Airport	Toyama	Chūbu	TOY/RJNT	736,740	9,314	1,783
35.	Nagoya Airfield	Nagoya	Chūbu	NKM/RJNA	735,114	42,278	0
36.	Shizuoka Airport	Shizuoka	Chūbu	FSZ/RJNS	699,276	9,496	776
37.	Kushiro Airport	Kushiro	Hokkaidō	KUH/RJCK	685,379	9,974	2,508
38.	Amami Airport	Amami	Kyūshū	ASJ/RJKA	676,601	15,236	1,230
39.	Miho-Yonago Airport	Yonago	Chūgoku	YGJ/RJOH	666,445	6,970	2,118
40.	Saga Airport	Saga	Kyūshū	HSG/RJFS	630,478	10,056	5,050
41.	Obihiro Airport	Obihiro	Hokkaidō	OBO/RJCB	605,703	12,942	3,004
42.	Ibaraki Airport	Tōkyō	Kantō	IBR/RJAH	538,227	5,006	300
43.	Hanamaki Airport	Hanamaki	Tōhoku	HNA/RJSI	395,647	11,334	213
44.	Tottori Airport	Tottori	Chūgoku	TTJ/RJOR	366,925	5,326	529
45.	Shonai Airport	Shōnai	Tōhoku	SYO/RJSY	364,815	4,214	533
46.	Marine Corps Air Station Iwakuni	Iwakuni	Chūgoku	IWK/RJOI	363,559	2,926	167
47.	Misawa Airport	Misawa	Tōhoku	MSJ/RJSM	252,616	3,666	987
48.	Fukushima Airport	Fukushima	Tōhoku	FKS/RJSF	250,535	7,680	124
49.	Tsushima Airport	Tsushima	Kyūshū	TSJ/RJDT	250,194	6,076	348
50.	Kumejima Airport	Kumejima	Okinawa	UEO/ROKJ	238,875	5,394	1,420

== 2014 final statistics ==
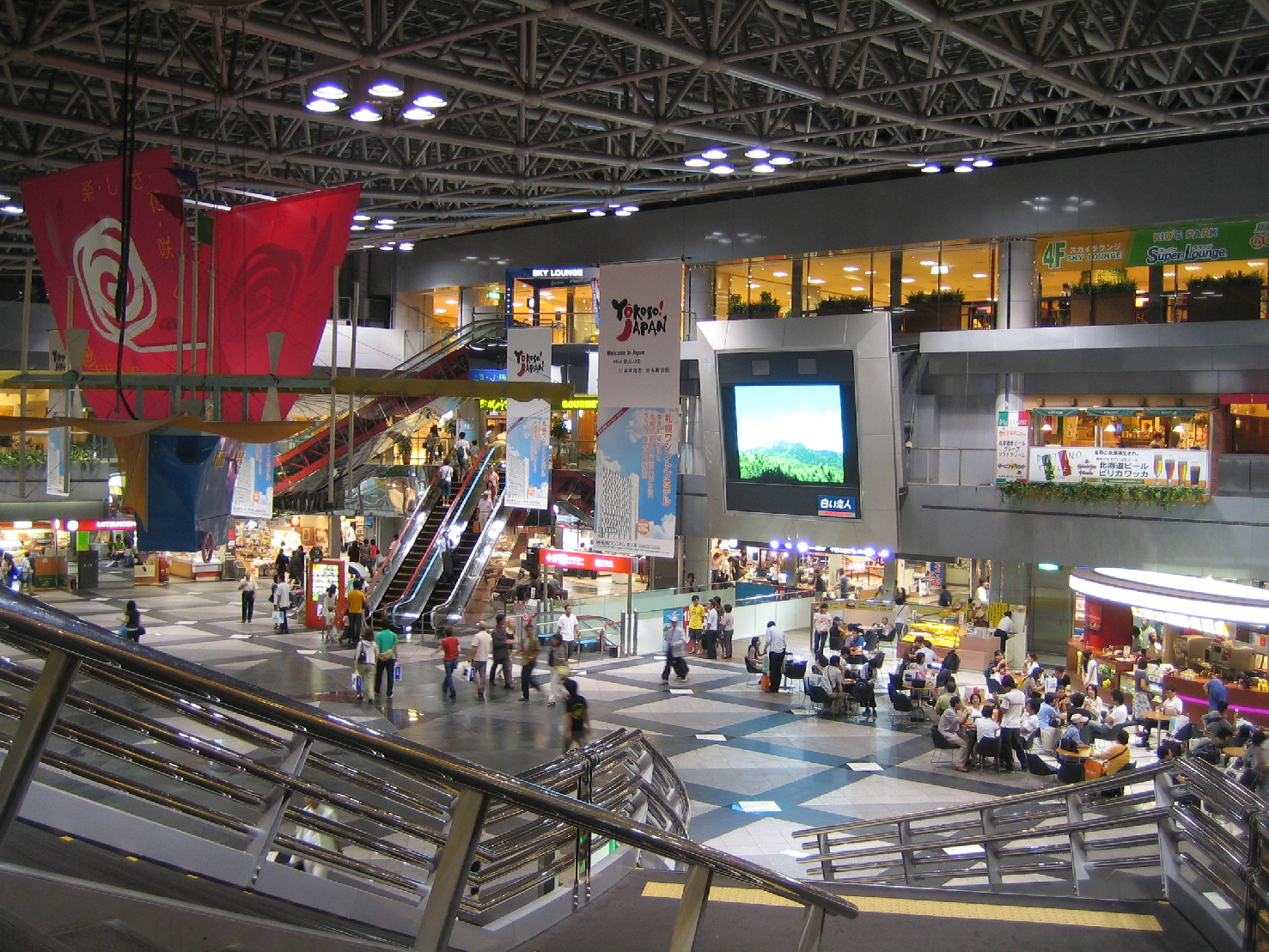
New Chitose Airport, serving Sapporo, became Japan's third busiest airport in 2006 and it has been in that position since then and up to 2014.

The 50 busiest airports in Japan in 2014 ordered by total passenger traffic, according to the MLIT reports.

Rank	Airport	City served	Region	IATA/ ICAO	Passengers	Aircraft	Cargo
1.	Haneda Airport	Tōkyō	Kantō	HND/RJTT	73,141,583	425,604	1,109,090
2.	Narita International Airport	Tōkyō	Kantō	NRT/RJAA	32,866,898	231,042	2,134,996
3.	Fukuoka Airport	Fukuoka	Kyūshū	FUK/RJFF	19,703,769	171,642	265,614
4.	New Chitose Airport	Sapporo	Hokkaidō	CTS/RJCC	19,270,922	138,602	234,010
5.	Kansai International Airport	Ōsaka	Kansai	KIX/RJBB	19,218,083	141,574	745,899
6.	Naha Airport	Naha	Okinawa	OKA/ROAH	17,293,780	153,974	419,926
7.	Osaka International Airport	Ōsaka	Kansai	ITM/RJOO	14,526,575	139,084	143,301
8.	Chūbu Centrair International Airport	Nagoya	Chūbu	NGO/RJGG	9,755,531	91,194	204,261
9.	Kagoshima Airport	Kagoshima	Kyūshū	KOJ/RJFK	5,154,250	65,720	34,461
10.	Sendai Airport	Sendai	Tōhoku	SDJ/RJSS	3,213,337	56,314	7,155
11.	Kumamoto Airport	Kumamoto	Kyūshū	KMJ/RJFT	3,067,624	39,690	18,845
12.	Nagasaki Airport	Nagasaki	Kyūshū	NGS/RJFU	2,964,474	31,704	15,604
13.	Miyazaki Airport	Miyazaki	Kyūshū	KMI/RJFM	2,852,009	41,516	11,094
14.	Matsuyama Airport	Matsuyama	Shikoku	MYJ/RJOM	2,838,910	31,930	8,271
15.	Hiroshima Airport	Hiroshima	Chūgoku	HIJ/RJOA	2,677,134	22,948	23,213
16.	Kobe Airport	Kōbe	Kansai	UKB/RJBE	2,497,755	28,212	737
17.	Ishigaki Airport	Ishigaki	Okinawa	ISG/ROIG	2,325,230	27,486	19,172
18.	Komatsu Airport	Komatsu	Chūbu	KMQ/RJNK	2,313,403	17,830	13,795
19.	Oita Airport	Ōita	Kyūshū	OIT/RJFO	1,732,422	21,874	8,396
20.	Takamatsu Airport	Takamatsu	Shikoku	TAK/RJOT	1,725,227	18,630	8,544
21.	Hakodate Airport	Hakodate	Hokkaidō	HKD/RJCH	1,686,747	16,940	9,513
22.	Okayama Airport	Okayama	Chūgoku	OKJ/RJOB	1,348,209	10,822	5,821
23.	Kōchi Airport	Kōchi, Kōchi	Shikoku	KCZ/RJOK	1,335,214	18,166	3,770
24.	Miyako Airport	Miyako-jima	Okinawa	MMY/ROMY	1,298,304	16,138	14,249
25.	Kitakyushu Airport	Kitakyūshū	Kyūshū	KKJ/RJFR	1,277,717	17,568	15,039
26.	Akita Airport	Akita	Tōhoku	AXT/RJSK	1,219,815	19,370	2,533
27.	Asahikawa Airport	Asahikawa	Hokkaidō	AKJ/RJEC	1,098,230	7,824	5,924
28.	Niigata Airport	Niigata	Chūbu	KIJ/RJSN	1,011,945	28,412	792
29.	Tokushima Airport	Tokushima	Shikoku	TKS/RJOS	1,011,853	10,958	2,500
30.	Toyama Airport	Toyama	Chūbu	TOY/RJNT	994,134	8,936	2,347
31.	Aomori Airport	Aomori	Tōhoku	AOJ/RJSA	912,990	14,262	2,830
32.	Miho-Yonago Airport	Yonago	Chūgoku	YGJ/RJOH	864,528	10,284	1,883
33.	Yamaguchi Ube Airport	Yamaguchi/Ube	Chūgoku	UBJ/RJDC	863,421	7,918	3,064
34.	Izumo Airport	Izumo	Chūgoku	IZO/RJOC	783,626	12,200	1,291
35.	Memanbetsu Airport	Ōzora	Hokkaidō	MMB/RJCM	737,504	10,088	1,894
36.	Kushiro Airport	Kushiro	Hokkaidō	KUH/RJCK	680,607	10,104	2,628
37.	Nagoya Airfield	Nagoya	Chūbu	NKM/RJNA	653,766	41,418	0
38.	Amami Airport	Amami	Kyūshū	ASJ/RJKA	603,762	15,028	1,307
39.	Obihiro Airport	Obihiro	Hokkaidō	OBO/RJCB	583,480	11,846	2,482
40.	Ibaraki Airport	Tōkyō	Kantō	IBR/RJAH	513,852	5,692	26
41.	Shizuoka Airport	Shizuoka	Chūbu	FSZ/RJNS	506,950	7,316	624
42.	Saga Airport	Saga	Kyūshū	HSG/RJFS	497,223	9,088	4,813
43.	Hanamaki Airport	Hanamaki	Tōhoku	HNA/RJSI	395,329	11,776	213
44.	Shonai Airport	Shōnai	Tōhoku	SYO/RJSY	368,618	4,080	727
45.	Marine Corps Air Station Iwakuni	Iwakuni	Chūgoku	IWK/RJOI	360,141	2,900	119
46.	Tottori Airport	Tottori	Chūgoku	TTJ/RJOR	335,333	5,290	508
47.	Tsushima Airport	Tsushima	Kyūshū	TSJ/RJDT	261,169	6,026	379
48.	Fukushima Airport	Fukushima	Tōhoku	FKS/RJSF	251,034	8,226	125
49.	Kumejima Airport	Kumejima	Okinawa	UEO/ROKJ	243,349	5,378	1,492
50.	Misawa Airport	Misawa	Tōhoku	MSJ/RJSM	242,013	3,562	1,009

== 2013 final statistics ==
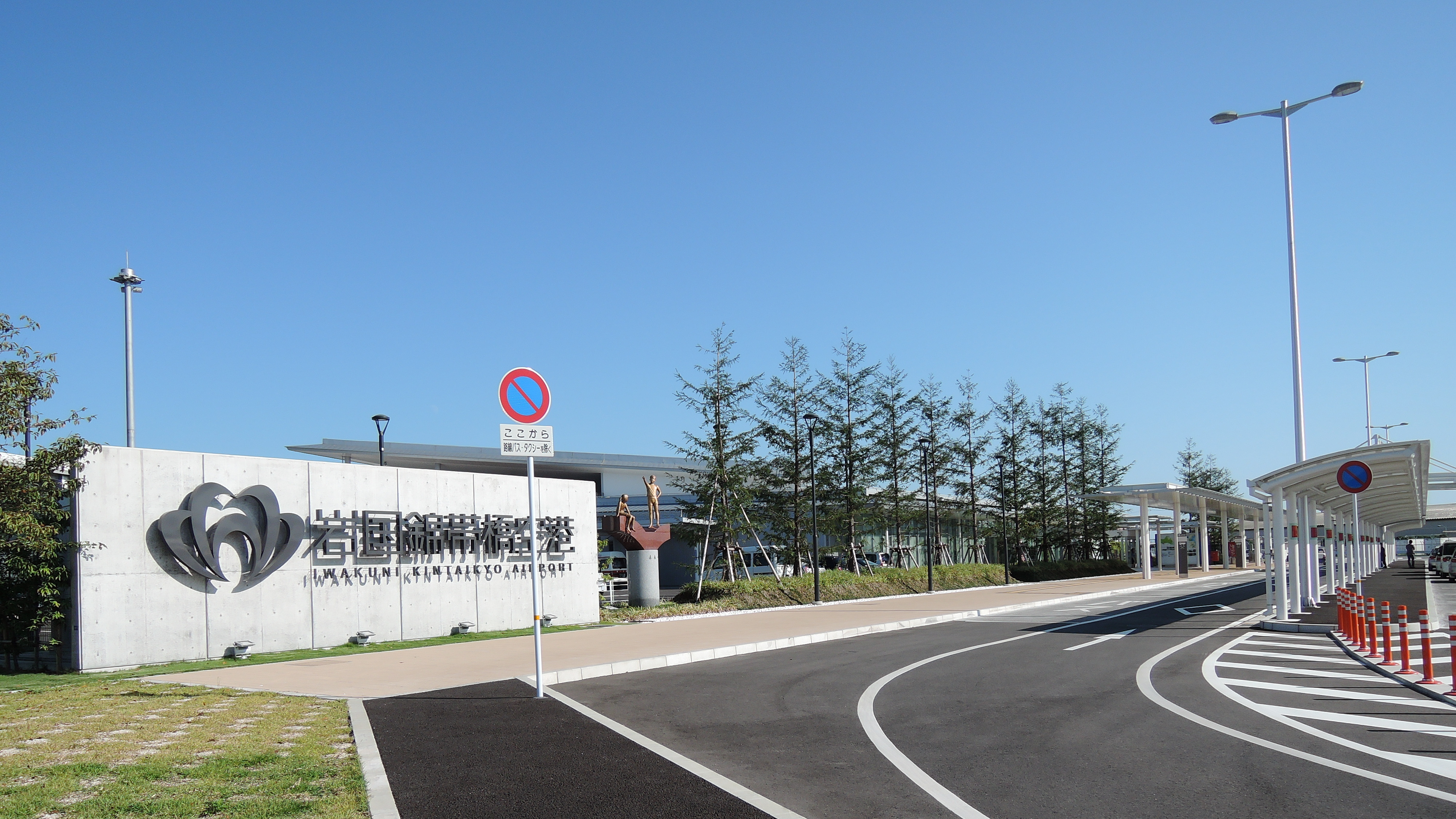
Marine Corps Air Station Iwakuni started to manage commercial traffic in 2013.

The 50 busiest airports in Japan in 2013 ordered by total passenger traffic, according to the MLIT reports.

Rank	Airport	City served	Region	IATA/ ICAO	Passengers	Aircraft	Cargo
1.	Haneda Airport	Tōkyō	Kantō	HND/RJTT	68,764,743	403,242	954,359
2.	Narita International Airport	Tōkyō	Kantō	NRT/RJAA	32,465,439	223,388	2,019,844
3.	Fukuoka Airport	Fukuoka	Kyūshū	FUK/RJFF	18,951,652	170,640	253,797
4.	New Chitose Airport	Sapporo	Hokkaidō	CTS/RJCC	18,674,344	134,312	226,905
5.	Kansai International Airport	Ōsaka	Kansai	KIX/RJBB	17,660,809	131,930	682,343
6.	Naha Airport	Naha	Okinawa	OKA/ROAH	16,039,825	147,302	388,387
7.	Osaka International Airport	Ōsaka	Kansai	ITM/RJOO	13,823,922	136,132	137,824
8.	Chūbu Centrair International Airport	Nagoya	Chūbu	NGO/RJGG	9,552,867	88,578	168,993
9.	Kagoshima Airport	Kagoshima	Kyūshū	KOJ/RJFK	5,042,755	65,830	34,806
10.	Sendai Airport	Sendai	Tōhoku	SDJ/RJSS	3,075,633	54,554	7,006
11.	Kumamoto Airport	Kumamoto	Kyūshū	KMJ/RJFT	2,989,294	39,254	17,967
12.	Miyazaki Airport	Miyazaki	Kyūshū	KMI/RJFM	2,815,154	43,246	11,064
13.	Nagasaki Airport	Nagasaki	Kyūshū	NGS/RJFU	2,812,748	31,270	14,228
14.	Hiroshima Airport	Hiroshima	Chūgoku	HIJ/RJOA	2,622,309	22,100	22,943
15.	Matsuyama Airport	Matsuyama	Shikoku	MYJ/RJOM	2,549,315	30,924	8,102
16.	Kobe Airport	Kōbe	Kansai	UKB/RJBE	2,323,192	27,028	4,697
17.	Komatsu Airport	Komatsu	Chūbu	KMQ/RJNK	2,269,615	17,780	13,494
18.	Ishigaki Airport	Ishigaki	Okinawa	ISG/ROIG	2,069,026	26,254	18,476
19.	Oita Airport	Ōita	Kyūshū	OIT/RJFO	1,662,588	20,094	9,651
20.	Hakodate Airport	Hakodate	Hokkaidō	HKD/RJCH	1,629,527	16,756	9,303
21.	Takamatsu Airport	Takamatsu	Shikoku	TAK/RJOT	1,518,185	15,624	8,556
22.	Kitakyushu Airport	Kitakyūshū	Kyūshū	KKJ/RJFR	1,358,100	18,276	14,644
23.	Okayama Airport	Okayama	Chūgoku	OKJ/RJOB	1,343,079	11,066	5,826
24.	Kōchi Airport	Kōchi, Kōchi	Shikoku	KCZ/RJOK	1,307,209	17,906	3,288
25.	Miyako Airport	Miyako-jima	Okinawa	MMY/ROMY	1,254,103	15,882	13,631
26.	Akita Airport	Akita	Tōhoku	AXT/RJSK	1,197,689	18,750	2,608
27.	Asahikawa Airport	Asahikawa	Hokkaidō	AKJ/RJEC	1,067,812	8,432	5,362
28.	Niigata Airport	Niigata	Chūbu	KIJ/RJSN	998,392	28,676	814
29.	Tokushima Airport	Tokushima	Shikoku	TKS/RJOS	954,667	9,880	2,322
30.	Toyama Airport	Toyama	Chūbu	TOY/RJNT	954,639	8,602	2,116
31.	Aomori Airport	Aomori	Tōhoku	AOJ/RJSA	860,158	12,226	3,027
32.	Yamaguchi Ube Airport	Yamaguchi/Ube	Chūgoku	UBJ/RJDC	839,068	7,876	2,745
33.	Izumo Airport	Izumo	Chūgoku	IZO/RJOC	817,907	12,338	1,181
34.	Memanbetsu Airport	Ōzora	Hokkaidō	MMB/RJCM	731,043	9,654	2,296
35.	Kushiro Airport	Kushiro	Hokkaidō	KUH/RJCK	676,834	10,190	2,799
36.	Nagoya Airfield	Nagoya	Chūbu	NKM/RJNA	593,170	39,718	0
37.	Miho-Yonago Airport	Yonago	Chūgoku	YGJ/RJOH	575,543	6,166	2,156
38.	Obihiro Airport	Obihiro	Hokkaidō	OBO/RJCB	571,477	13,784	2,518
39.	Amami Airport	Amami	Kyūshū	ASJ/RJKA	556,111	14,208	1,399
40.	Shizuoka Airport	Shizuoka	Chūbu	FSZ/RJNS	460,657	7,426	597
41.	Ibaraki Airport	Tōkyō	Kantō	IBR/RJAH	389,402	4,202	9
42.	Hanamaki Airport	Hanamaki	Tōhoku	HNA/RJSI	368,801	11,684	183
43.	Marine Corps Air Station Iwakuni	Iwakuni	Chūgoku	IWK/RJOI	356,170	2,918	47
44.	Saga Airport	Saga	Kyūshū	HSG/RJFS	355,582	8,218	8,748
45.	Shonai Airport	Shōnai	Tōhoku	SYO/RJSY	350,172	3,842	683
46.	Tottori Airport	Tottori	Chūgoku	TTJ/RJOR	324,808	4,664	509
47.	Tsushima Airport	Tsushima	Kyūshū	TSJ/RJDT	257,338	6,324	401
48.	Misawa Airport	Misawa	Tōhoku	MSJ/RJSM	254,343	3,332	1,156
49.	Fukushima Airport	Fukushima	Tōhoku	FKS/RJSF	244,242	8,882	115
50.	Kumejima Airport	Kumejima	Okinawa	UEO/ROKJ	231,811	5,066	1,540

== 2012 final statistics ==
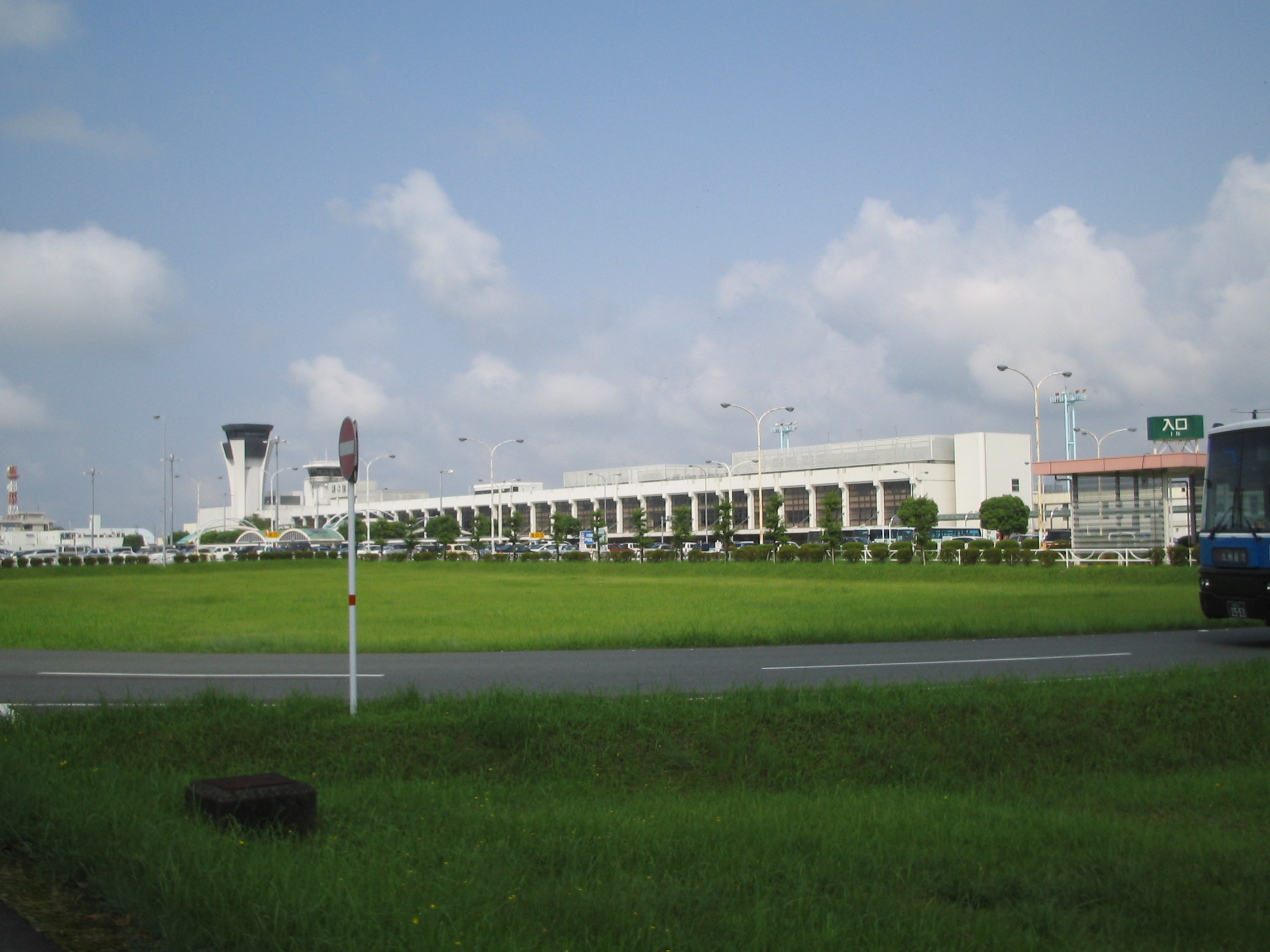
Kumamoto Airport is usually between the top 10 busiest airports in Japan, like in the year 2012.

The 50 busiest airports in Japan in 2012 ordered by total passenger traffic, according to the MLIT reports.

Rank	Airport	City served	Region	IATA/ ICAO	Passengers	Aircraft	Cargo
1.	Haneda Airport	Tōkyō	Kantō	HND/RJTT	67,211,617	391,156	909,288
2.	Narita International Airport	Tōkyō	Kantō	NRT/RJAA	30,002,325	210,518	2,006,172
3.	New Chitose Airport	Sapporo	Hokkaidō	CTS/RJCC	17,463,051	123,652	229,302
4.	Fukuoka Airport	Fukuoka	Kyūshū	FUK/RJFF	17,416,567	155,968	254,040
5.	Kansai International Airport	Ōsaka	Kansai	KIX/RJBB	15,906,012	124,034	718,274
6.	Naha Airport	Naha	Okinawa	OKA/ROAH	15,042,959	146,424	369,972
7.	Osaka International Airport	Ōsaka	Kansai	ITM/RJOO	13,218,471	127,688	126,390
8.	Chūbu Centrair International Airport	Nagoya	Chūbu	NGO/RJGG	9,102,000	83,866	148,810
9.	Kagoshima Airport	Kagoshima	Kyūshū	KOJ/RJFK	4,709,130	61,890	35,091
10.	Kumamoto Airport	Kumamoto	Kyūshū	KMJ/RJFT	2,912,028	38,530	19,464
11.	Hiroshima Airport	Hiroshima	Chūgoku	HIJ/RJOA	2,691,361	22,680	23,338
12.	Sendai Airport	Sendai	Tōhoku	SDJ/RJSS	2,666,464	45,532	6,629
13.	Nagasaki Airport	Nagasaki	Kyūshū	NGS/RJFU	2,662,086	31,418	13,603
14.	Miyazaki Airport	Miyazaki	Kyūshū	KMI/RJFM	2,660,584	38,990	10,768
15.	Kobe Airport	Kōbe	Kansai	UKB/RJBE	2,476,634	26,662	7,744
16.	Matsuyama Airport	Matsuyama	Shikoku	MYJ/RJOM	2,342,288	28,578	7,194
17.	Komatsu Airport	Komatsu	Chūbu	KMQ/RJNK	2,159,222	15,690	17,824
18.	Ishigaki Airport	Ishigaki	Okinawa	ISG/ROIG	1,620,164	22,124	18,028
19.	Hakodate Airport	Hakodate	Hokkaidō	HKD/RJCH	1,492,722	17,146	9,995
20.	Oita Airport	Ōita	Kyūshū	OIT/RJFO	1,484,014	17,024	8,814
21.	Takamatsu Airport	Takamatsu	Shikoku	TAK/RJOT	1,412,791	15,654	9,563
22.	Okayama Airport	Okayama	Chūgoku	OKJ/RJOB	1,352,078	10,980	7,611
23.	Miyako Airport	Miyako-jima	Okinawa	MMY/ROMY	1,272,774	18,378	13,653
24.	Kitakyushu Airport	Kitakyūshū	Kyūshū	KKJ/RJFR	1,262,236	18,096	13,441
25.	Kōchi Airport	Kōchi, Kōchi	Shikoku	KCZ/RJOK	1,215,073	19,256	3,296
26.	Akita Airport	Akita	Tōhoku	AXT/RJSK	1,156,586	18,752	2,359
27.	Asahikawa Airport	Asahikawa	Hokkaidō	AKJ/RJEC	1,063,264	9,530	4,996
28.	Niigata Airport	Niigata	Chūbu	KIJ/RJSN	963,731	28,194	836
29.	Toyama Airport	Toyama	Chūbu	TOY/RJNT	942,094	9,176	1,882
30.	Tokushima Airport	Tokushima	Shikoku	TKS/RJOS	883,342	9,686	2,201
31.	Yamaguchi Ube Airport	Yamaguchi/Ube	Chūgoku	UBJ/RJDC	846,726	7,860	2,569
32.	Aomori Airport	Aomori	Tōhoku	AOJ/RJSA	824,818	12,376	3,351
33.	Memanbetsu Airport	Ōzora	Hokkaidō	MMB/RJCM	718,374	10,832	2,235
34.	Izumo Airport	Izumo	Chūgoku	IZO/RJOC	691,654	12,204	1,304
35.	Kushiro Airport	Kushiro	Hokkaidō	KUH/RJCK	637,603	8,630	3,399
36.	Obihiro Airport	Obihiro	Hokkaidō	OBO/RJCB	565,524	12,216	3,205
37.	Amami Airport	Amami	Kyūshū	ASJ/RJKA	535,372	14,360	1,555
38.	Nagoya Airfield	Nagoya	Chūbu	NKM/RJNA	479,193	39,204	0
39.	Miho-Yonago Airport	Yonago	Chūgoku	YGJ/RJOH	463,252	6,108	2,361
40.	Shizuoka Airport	Shizuoka	Chūbu	FSZ/RJNS	439,811	6,976	582
41.	Ibaraki Airport	Tōkyō	Kantō	IBR/RJAH	395,302	4,210	24
42.	Shonai Airport	Shōnai	Tōhoku	SYO/RJSY	355,583	3,982	595
43.	Saga Airport	Saga	Kyūshū	HSG/RJFS	345,066	8,314	8,509
44.	Hanamaki Airport	Hanamaki	Tōhoku	HNA/RJSI	327,564	10,166	153
45.	Tottori Airport	Tottori	Chūgoku	TTJ/RJOR	297,525	4,512	560
46.	Tsushima Airport	Tsushima	Kyūshū	TSJ/RJDT	256,297	6,400	418
47.	Misawa Airport	Misawa	Tōhoku	MSJ/RJSM	229,616	2,178	1,264
48.	Fukushima Airport	Fukushima	Tōhoku	FKS/RJSF	225,687	8,402	101
49.	Kumejima Airport	Kumejima	Okinawa	UEO/ROKJ	222,501	5,202	1,609
50.	Hachijojima Airport	Hachijō-jima	Kantō	HAC/RJTH	196,608	3,892	1,332

== 2011 final statistics ==
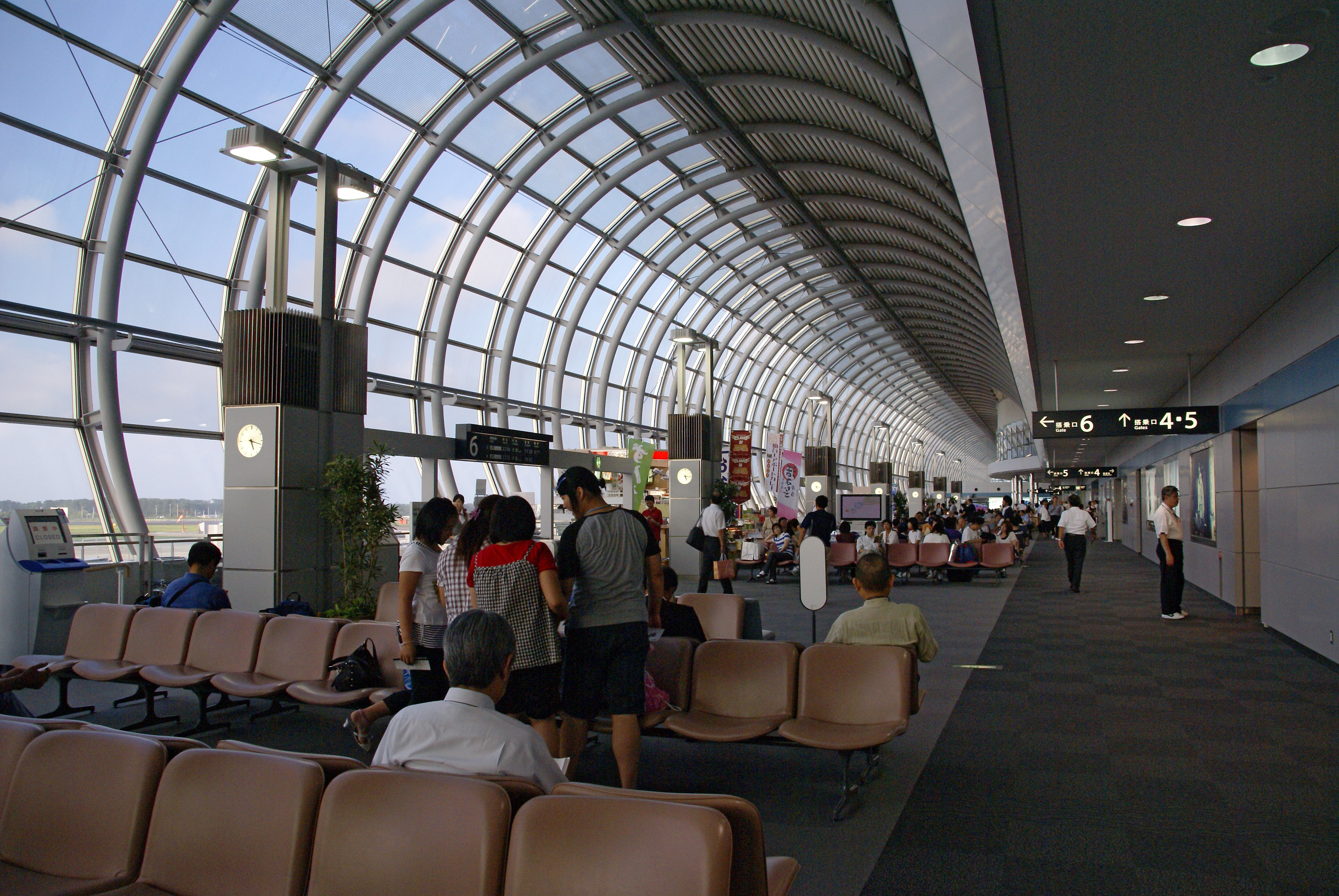
Sendai Airport was hit hard by the 2011 Tōhoku earthquake and tsunami, with passenger traffic dropping 50% that year. Since then, Sendai Airport has slowly recovered its level of traffic.

The 50 busiest airports in Japan in 2011 ordered by total passenger traffic, according to the MLIT reports.

Rank	Airport	City served	Region	IATA/ ICAO	Passengers	Aircraft	Cargo
1.	Haneda Airport	Tōkyō	Kantō	HND/RJTT	62,796,249	379,670	879,409
2.	Narita International Airport	Tōkyō	Kantō	NRT/RJAA	25,377,438	184,758	1,945,351
3.	New Chitose Airport	Sapporo	Hokkaidō	CTS/RJCC	15,774,467	112,688	233,628
4.	Fukuoka Airport	Fukuoka	Kyūshū	FUK/RJFF	15,393,954	139,106	249,598
5.	Naha Airport	Naha	Okinawa	OKA/ROAH	13,725,680	131,292	373,387
6.	Kansai International Airport	Ōsaka	Kansai	KIX/RJBB	13,329,301	105,996	742,707
7.	Osaka International Airport	Ōsaka	Kansai	ITM/RJOO	12,775,797	120,728	123,035
8.	Chūbu Centrair International Airport	Nagoya	Chūbu	NGO/RJGG	8,636,108	81,280	148,210
9.	Kagoshima Airport	Kagoshima	Kyūshū	KOJ/RJFK	4,461,208	62,062	34,976
10.	Kumamoto Airport	Kumamoto	Kyūshū	KMJ/RJFT	2,816,245	37,898	21,011
11.	Kobe Airport	Kōbe	Kansai	UKB/RJBE	2,538,578	23,640	8,515
12.	Hiroshima Airport	Hiroshima	Chūgoku	HIJ/RJOA	2,509,855	20,942	23,642
13.	Miyazaki Airport	Miyazaki	Kyūshū	KMI/RJFM	2,414,328	35,842	10,566
14.	Nagasaki Airport	Nagasaki	Kyūshū	NGS/RJFU	2,410,528	37,364	12,873
15.	Matsuyama Airport	Matsuyama	Shikoku	MYJ/RJOM	2,181,268	28,302	8,837
16.	Komatsu Airport	Komatsu	Chūbu	KMQ/RJNK	1,933,892	15,292	20,191
17.	Sendai Airport	Sendai	Tōhoku	SDJ/RJSS	1,717,102	29,002	4,453
18.	Ishigaki Airport	Ishigaki	Okinawa	ISG/ROIG	1,531,509	22,022	17,563
19.	Hakodate Airport	Hakodate	Hokkaidō	HKD/RJCH	1,394,499	16,546	10,582
20.	Oita Airport	Ōita	Kyūshū	OIT/RJFO	1,350,025	16,742	7,440
21.	Takamatsu Airport	Takamatsu	Shikoku	TAK/RJOT	1,292,031	14,500	9,575
22.	Okayama Airport	Okayama	Chūgoku	OKJ/RJOB	1,236,728	10,392	6,646
23.	Kitakyushu Airport	Kitakyūshū	Kyūshū	KKJ/RJFR	1,150,720	15,896	13,302
24.	Kōchi Airport	Kōchi, Kōchi	Shikoku	KCZ/RJOK	1,144,417	19,524	3,727
25.	Akita Airport	Akita	Tōhoku	AXT/RJSK	1,111,190	14,650	2,532
26.	Miyako Airport	Miyako-jima	Okinawa	MMY/ROMY	1,093,670	15,658	13,275
27.	Asahikawa Airport	Asahikawa	Hokkaidō	AKJ/RJEC	940,657	9,628	5,407
28.	Toyama Airport	Toyama	Chūbu	TOY/RJNT	877,446	9,262	2,016
29.	Niigata Airport	Niigata	Chūbu	KIJ/RJSN	861,271	24,406	953
30.	Aomori Airport	Aomori	Tōhoku	AOJ/RJSA	823,346	10,716	3,527
31.	Tokushima Airport	Tokushima	Shikoku	TKS/RJOS	757,550	9,108	1,655
32.	Yamaguchi Ube Airport	Yamaguchi/Ube	Chūgoku	UBJ/RJDC	743,852	7,432	2,712
33.	Memanbetsu Airport	Ōzora	Hokkaidō	MMB/RJCM	657,616	10,206	2,241
34.	Izumo Airport	Izumo	Chūgoku	IZO/RJOC	624,863	11,544	1,011
35.	Kushiro Airport	Kushiro	Hokkaidō	KUH/RJCK	601,378	9,196	2,978
36.	Amami Airport	Amami	Kyūshū	ASJ/RJKA	534,022	14,220	1,675
37.	Obihiro Airport	Obihiro	Hokkaidō	OBO/RJCB	511,862	10,572	3,489
38.	Shizuoka Airport	Shizuoka	Chūbu	FSZ/RJNS	430,525	7,618	442
39.	Miho-Yonago Airport	Yonago	Chūgoku	YGJ/RJOH	418,034	5,648	2,348
40.	Shonai Airport	Shōnai	Tōhoku	SYO/RJSY	354,003	4,444	669
41.	Nagoya Airfield	Nagoya	Chūbu	NKM/RJNA	299,217	38,318	0
42.	Saga Airport	Saga	Kyūshū	HSG/RJFS	298,729	7,798	8,864
43.	Hanamaki Airport	Hanamaki	Tōhoku	HNA/RJSI	290,781	11,538	182
44.	Ibaraki Airport	Tōkyō	Kantō	IBR/RJAH	277,721	3,328	0
45.	Tottori Airport	Tottori	Chūgoku	TTJ/RJOR	277,136	4,386	699
46.	Misawa Airport	Misawa	Tōhoku	MSJ/RJSM	262,820	2,180	1,399
47.	Tsushima Airport	Tsushima	Kyūshū	TSJ/RJDT	260,117	6,350	482
48.	Fukushima Airport	Fukushima	Tōhoku	FKS/RJSF	232,876	9,982	256
49.	Kumejima Airport	Kumejima	Okinawa	UEO/ROKJ	225,456	4,798	1,825
50.	Yamagata Airport	Yamagata	Tōhoku	GAJ/RJSC	222,397	6,824	11

== 2010 final statistics ==
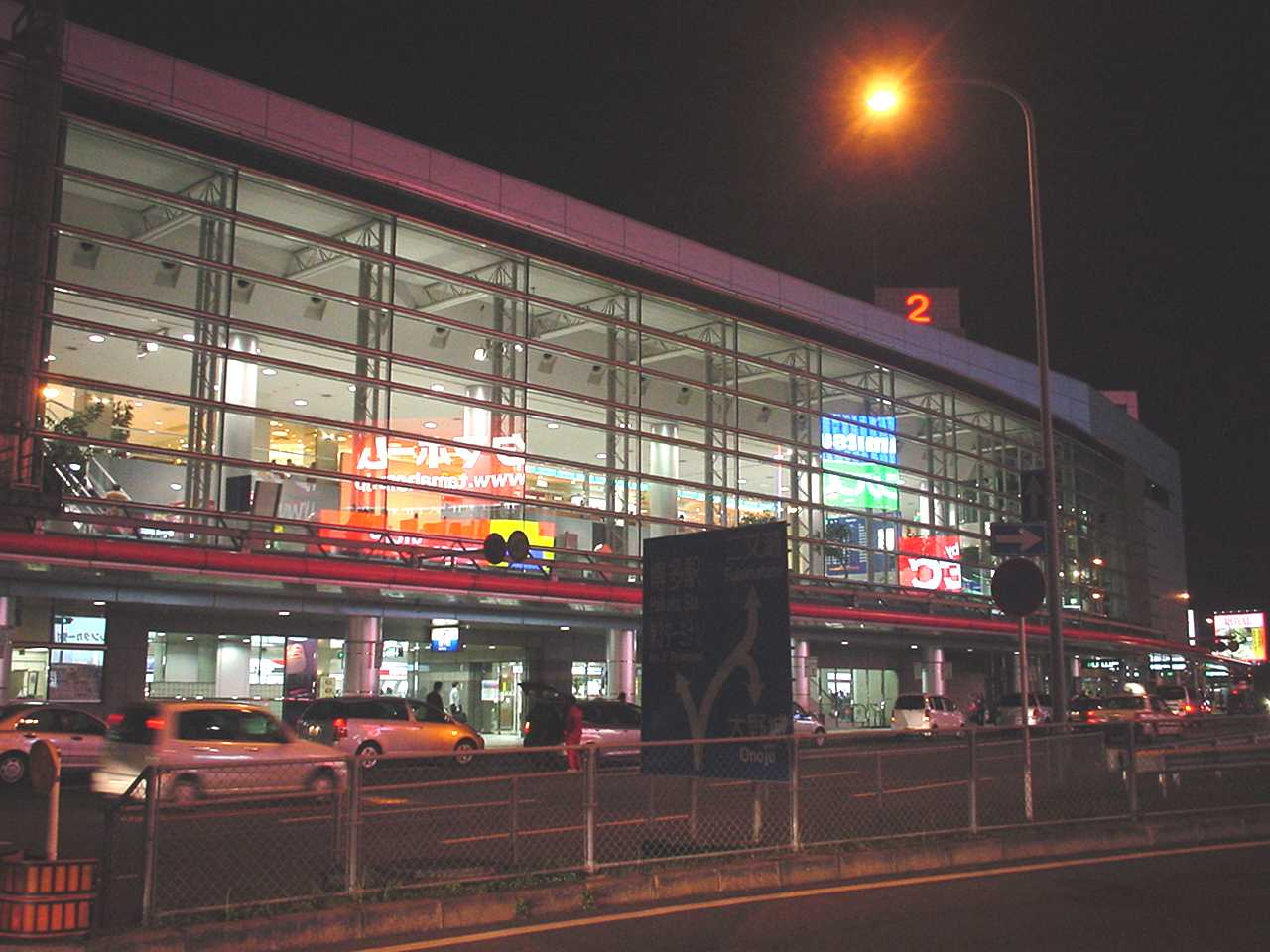
Fukuoka Airport is an important gateway for Southern Japan, and the country's fourth busiest airport.

The 50 busiest airports in Japan in 2010 ordered by total passenger traffic, according to the MLIT reports.

Rank	Airport	City served	Region	IATA/ ICAO	Passengers	Aircraft	Cargo
1.	Haneda Airport	Tōkyō	Kantō	HND/RJTT	64,211,074	342,804	818,809
2.	Narita International Airport	Tōkyō	Kantō	NRT/RJAA	30,780,002	192,646	2,167,863
3.	New Chitose Airport	Sapporo	Hokkaidō	CTS/RJCC	16,748,180	109,206	227,932
4.	Fukuoka Airport	Fukuoka	Kyūshū	FUK/RJFF	16,344,552	137,350	256,976
5.	Osaka International Airport	Ōsaka	Kansai	ITM/RJOO	14,788,543	128,010	135,462
6.	Naha Airport	Naha	Okinawa	OKA/ROAH	14,525,656	130,906	388,408
7.	Kansai International Airport	Ōsaka	Kansai	KIX/RJBB	14,220,204	106,712	759,278
8.	Chūbu Centrair International Airport	Nagoya	Chūbu	NGO/RJGG	9,271,382	84,684	161,740
9.	Kagoshima Airport	Kagoshima	Kyūshū	KOJ/RJFK	4,967,625	63,458	42,759
10.	Kumamoto Airport	Kumamoto	Kyūshū	KMJ/RJFT	2,874,963	36,050	26,141
11.	Sendai Airport	Sendai	Tōhoku	SDJ/RJSS	2,826,277	45,954	13,238
12.	Hiroshima Airport	Hiroshima	Chūgoku	HIJ/RJOA	2,810,188	20,012	24,490
13.	Miyazaki Airport	Miyazaki	Kyūshū	KMI/RJFM	2,683,058	35,860	12,460
14.	Matsuyama Airport	Matsuyama	Shikoku	MYJ/RJOM	2,381,354	28,456	9,388
15.	Nagasaki Airport	Nagasaki	Kyūshū	NGS/RJFU	2,331,002	38,280	15,009
16.	Kobe Airport	Kōbe	Kansai	UKB/RJBE	2,224,035	19,730	11,493
17.	Komatsu Airport	Komatsu	Chūbu	KMQ/RJNK	2,117,984	16,038	18,688
18.	Ishigaki Airport	Ishigaki	Okinawa	ISG/ROIG	1,693,069	23,474	18,388
19.	Hakodate Airport	Hakodate	Hokkaidō	HKD/RJCH	1,582,464	17,704	13,343
20.	Oita Airport	Ōita	Kyūshū	OIT/RJFO	1,536,045	16,362	10,937
21.	Takamatsu Airport	Takamatsu	Shikoku	TAK/RJOT	1,423,323	14,308	11,606
22.	Okayama Airport	Okayama	Chūgoku	OKJ/RJOB	1,348,054	11,642	7,104
23.	Kōchi Airport	Kōchi, Kōchi	Shikoku	KCZ/RJOK	1,273,146	18,806	3,811
24.	Kitakyushu Airport	Kitakyūshū	Kyūshū	KKJ/RJFR	1,199,743	14,984	11,555
25.	Asahikawa Airport	Asahikawa	Hokkaidō	AKJ/RJEC	1,198,376	10,608	8,315
26.	Akita Airport	Akita	Tōhoku	AXT/RJSK	1,108,293	15,532	2,669
27.	Miyako Airport	Miyako-jima	Okinawa	MMY/ROMY	1,092,553	14,296	14,000
28.	Aomori Airport	Aomori	Tōhoku	AOJ/RJSA	1,030,985	10,996	4,971
29.	Toyama Airport	Toyama	Chūbu	TOY/RJNT	949,159	9,626	2,079
30.	Niigata Airport	Niigata	Chūbu	KIJ/RJSN	941,877	25,114	1,004
31.	Tokushima Airport	Tokushima	Shikoku	TKS/RJOS	808,441	8,160	2,261
32.	Yamaguchi Ube Airport	Yamaguchi/Ube	Chūgoku	UBJ/RJDC	795,973	6,598	3,481
33.	Memanbetsu Airport	Ōzora	Hokkaidō	MMB/RJCM	710,957	9,450	2,599
34.	Kushiro Airport	Kushiro	Hokkaidō	KUH/RJCK	709,151	11,518	3,920
35.	Izumo Airport	Izumo	Chūgoku	IZO/RJOC	701,699	12,180	1,613
36.	Shizuoka Airport	Shizuoka	Chūbu	FSZ/RJNS	593,233	9,688	177
37.	Obihiro Airport	Obihiro	Hokkaidō	OBO/RJCB	551,805	11,258	6,418
38.	Amami Airport	Amami	Kyūshū	ASJ/RJKA	526,697	12,626	1,927
39.	Miho-Yonago Airport	Yonago	Chūgoku	YGJ/RJOH	468,694	6,650	2,327
40.	Nagoya Airfield	Nagoya	Chūbu	NKM/RJNA	445,043	45,052	0
41.	Shonai Airport	Shōnai	Tōhoku	SYO/RJSY	355,849	3,998	669
42.	Saga Airport	Saga	Kyūshū	HSG/RJFS	339,992	9,088	11,292
43.	Tottori Airport	Tottori	Chūgoku	TTJ/RJOR	305,381	4,920	827
44.	Hanamaki Airport	Hanamaki	Tōhoku	HNA/RJSI	284,994	7,836	555
45.	Fukushima Airport	Fukushima	Tōhoku	FKS/RJSF	276,755	9,758	165
46.	Tsushima Airport	Tsushima	Kyūshū	TSJ/RJDT	264,166	6,430	547
47.	Misawa Airport	Misawa	Tōhoku	MSJ/RJSM	262,816	2,752	1,446
48.	Kumejima Airport	Kumejima	Okinawa	UEO/ROKJ	238,103	4,928	0.0
49.	Okadama Airport	Sapporo	Hokkaidō	OKD/RJCO	205,007	15,838	21
50.	Hachijojima Airport	Hachijō-jima	Kantō	HAC/RJTH	194,589	3,936	1,386

== 2009 final statistics ==
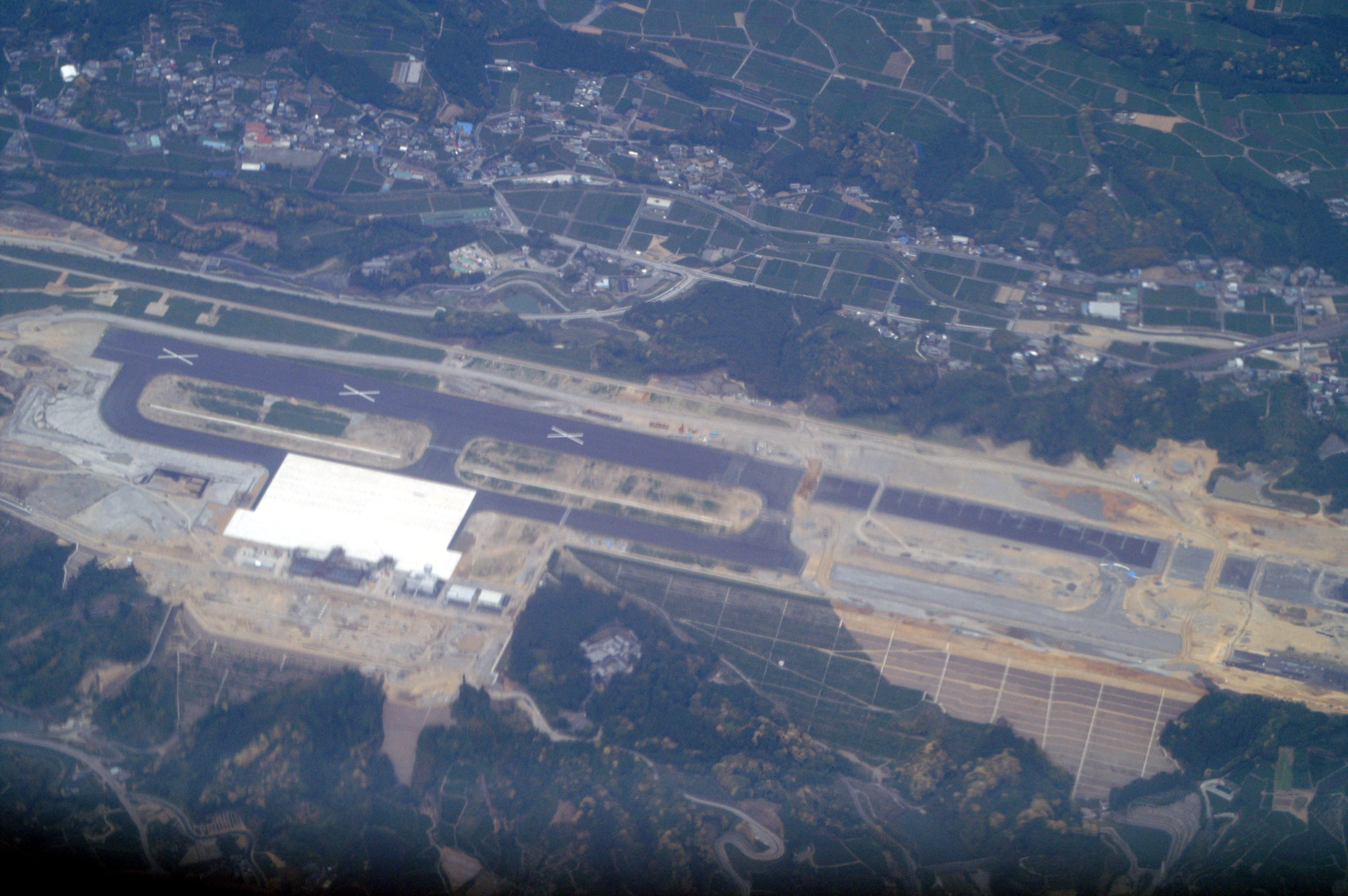
Shizuoka Airport was opened in 2009. It is one of the country's newest airports, and that year was ranked as the 40th busiest.

The 50 busiest airports in Japan in 2009 ordered by total passenger traffic, according to the MLIT reports.

Rank	Airport	City served	Region	IATA/ ICAO	Passengers	Aircraft	Cargo
1.	Haneda Airport	Tōkyō	Kantō	HND/RJTT	61,934,302	335,716	789,851
2.	Narita International Airport	Tōkyō	Kantō	NRT/RJAA	28,880,467	188,400	1,851,976
3.	New Chitose Airport	Sapporo	Hokkaidō	CTS/RJCC	16,537,566	99,652	235,771
4.	Fukuoka Airport	Fukuoka	Kyūshū	FUK/RJFF	15,901,604	135,360	245,233
5.	Naha Airport	Naha	Okinawa	OKA/ROAH	14,036,910	125,222	259,235
6.	Osaka International Airport	Ōsaka	Kansai	ITM/RJOO	14,562,851	130,772	134,462
7.	Kansai International Airport	Ōsaka	Kansai	KIX/RJBB	13,319,501	111,906	608,876
8.	Chūbu Centrair International Airport	Nagoya	Chūbu	NGO/RJGG	9,178,791	87,862	151,111
9.	Kagoshima Airport	Kagoshima	Kyūshū	KOJ/RJFK	5,032,123	63,090	43,636
10.	Kumamoto Airport	Kumamoto	Kyūshū	KMJ/RJFT	2,851,772	35,632	30,853
11.	Hiroshima Airport	Hiroshima	Chūgoku	HIJ/RJOA	2,844,970	20,596	24,933
12.	Sendai Airport	Sendai	Tōhoku	SDJ/RJSS	2,798,647	49,844	14,878
13.	Miyazaki Airport	Miyazaki	Kyūshū	KMI/RJFM	2,709,625	37,404	12,837
14.	Matsuyama Airport	Matsuyama	Shikoku	MYJ/RJOM	2,366,077	30,480	8,577
15.	Nagasaki Airport	Nagasaki	Kyūshū	NGS/RJFU	2,340,070	43,658	16,087
16.	Kobe Airport	Kōbe	Kansai	UKB/RJBE	2,330,076	18,730	17,615
17.	Komatsu Airport	Komatsu	Chūbu	KMQ/RJNK	2,068,766	15,106	13,999
18.	Ishigaki Airport	Ishigaki	Okinawa	ISG/ROIG	1,756,347	24,720	18,342
19.	Oita Airport	Ōita	Kyūshū	OIT/RJFO	1,550,956	17,334	12,336
20.	Hakodate Airport	Hakodate	Hokkaidō	HKD/RJCH	1,503,821	16,650	16,842
21.	Takamatsu Airport	Takamatsu	Shikoku	TAK/RJOT	1,367,746	14,420	11,270
22.	Okayama Airport	Okayama	Chūgoku	OKJ/RJOB	1,319,263	11,914	6,629
23.	Kōchi Airport	Kōchi, Kōchi	Shikoku	KCZ/RJOK	1,193,869	18,936	4,507
24.	Asahikawa Airport	Asahikawa	Hokkaidō	AKJ/RJEC	1,186,436	10,218	10,323
25.	Kitakyushu Airport	Kitakyūshū	Kyūshū	KKJ/RJFR	1,158,888	15,726	6,665
26.	Akita Airport	Akita	Tōhoku	AXT/RJSK	1,093,556	15,174	3,517
27.	Aomori Airport	Aomori	Tōhoku	AOJ/RJSA	1,054,321	10,788	6,033
28.	Miyako Airport	Miyako-jima	Okinawa	MMY/ROMY	1,049,585	14,944	14,323
29.	Niigata Airport	Niigata	Chūbu	KIJ/RJSN	963,154	25,416	1,373
30.	Toyama Airport	Toyama	Chūbu	TOY/RJNT	952,490	9,476	2,161
31.	Yamaguchi Ube Airport	Yamaguchi/Ube	Chūgoku	UBJ/RJDC	787,645	6,866	3,516
32.	Memanbetsu Airport	Ōzora	Hokkaidō	MMB/RJCM	768,198	9,398	3,314
33.	Tokushima Airport	Tokushima	Shikoku	TKS/RJOS	758,354	8,012	3,220
34.	Kushiro Airport	Kushiro	Hokkaidō	KUH/RJCK	736,812	12,530	5,449
35.	Izumo Airport	Izumo	Chūgoku	IZO/RJOC	694,022	12,706	2,043
36.	Obihiro Airport	Obihiro	Hokkaidō	OBO/RJCB	561,557	12,378	8,895
37.	Amami Airport	Amami	Kyūshū	ASJ/RJKA	544,391	11,926	2,068
38.	Miho-Yonago Airport	Yonago	Chūgoku	YGJ/RJOH	438,246	6,998	2,139
39.	Nagoya Airfield	Nagoya	Chūbu	NKM/RJNA	433,473	45,372	0
40.	Shizuoka Airport	Shizuoka	Chūbu	FSZ/RJNS	364,405	5,700	50
41.	Hanamaki Airport	Hanamaki	Tōhoku	HNA/RJSI	355,410	8,080	932
42.	Shonai Airport	Shōnai	Tōhoku	SYO/RJSY	342,131	4,570	880
43.	Okadama Airport	Sapporo	Hokkaidō	OKD/RJCO	327,658	19,132	31
44.	Saga Airport	Saga	Kyūshū	HSG/RJFS	315,551	9,244	12,869
45.	Tottori Airport	Tottori	Chūgoku	TTJ/RJOR	293,409	4,920	908
46.	Fukushima Airport	Fukushima	Tōhoku	FKS/RJSF	288,673	9,384	380
47.	Tsushima Airport	Tsushima	Kyūshū	TSJ/RJDT	273,739	6,380	663
48.	Misawa Airport	Misawa	Tōhoku	MSJ/RJSM	258,849	2,898	1,440
49.	Kumejima Airport	Kumejima	Okinawa	UEO/ROKJ	231,294	5,092	2,077
50.	Hachijojima Airport	Hachijō-jima	Kantō	HAC/RJTH	191,886	4,710	2,007

== 2008 final statistics ==
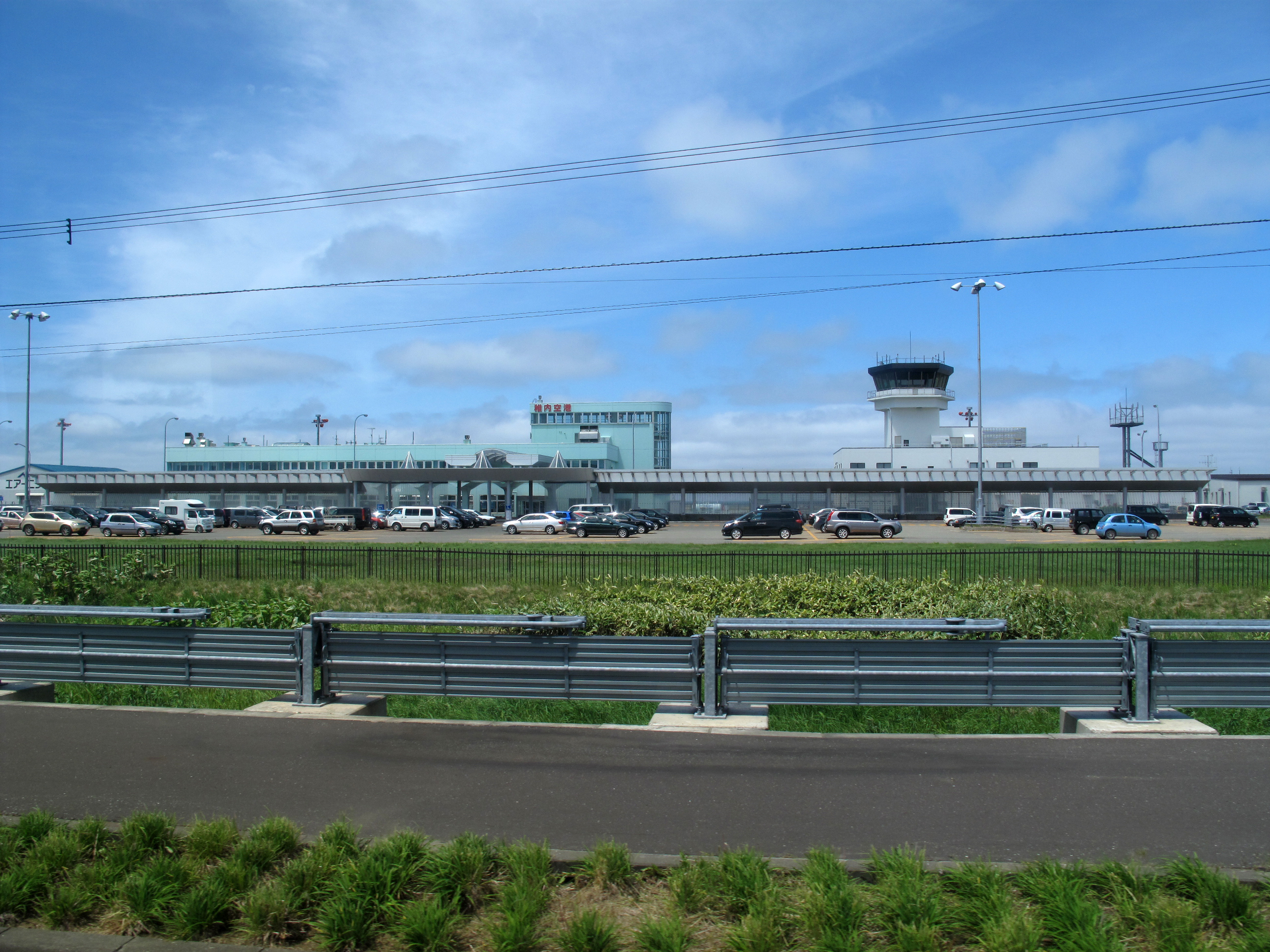
Wakkanai Airport is the northernmost airport in Japan and constantly affected by closures in winter. It appeared in the top 50 ranking for the last time in 2008.

The 50 busiest airports in Japan in 2008 ordered by total passenger traffic, according to the MLIT reports.

Rank	Airport	City served	Region	IATA/ ICAO	Passengers	Aircraft	Cargo
1.	Haneda Airport	Tōkyō	Kantō	HND/RJTT	66,707,213	339,612	849,404
2.	Narita International Airport	Tōkyō	Kantō	NRT/RJAA	30,431,127	194,442	2,100,447
3.	New Chitose Airport	Sapporo	Hokkaidō	CTS/RJCC	17,656,262	100,224	264,926
4.	Fukuoka Airport	Fukuoka	Kyūshū	FUK/RJFF	17,291,219	135,388	274,655
5.	Kansai International Airport	Ōsaka	Kansai	KIX/RJBB	15,755,591	133,498	846,034
6.	Osaka International Airport	Ōsaka	Kansai	ITM/RJOO	15,632,777	130,082	146,033
7.	Naha Airport	Naha	Okinawa	OKA/ROAH	15,173,957	123,670	247,606
8.	Chūbu Centrair International Airport	Nagoya	Chūbu	NGO/RJGG	10,994,749	98,432	194,238
9.	Kagoshima Airport	Kagoshima	Kyūshū	KOJ/RJFK	5,539,453	65,748	48,690
10.	Hiroshima Airport	Hiroshima	Chūgoku	HIJ/RJOA	3,188,637	21,324	28,306
11.	Kumamoto Airport	Kumamoto	Kyūshū	KMJ/RJFT	3,107,076	36,106	35,211
12.	Sendai Airport	Sendai	Tōhoku	SDJ/RJSS	3,049,257	47,524	17,876
13.	Miyazaki Airport	Miyazaki	Kyūshū	KMI/RJFM	2,992,970	37,736	15,093
14.	Kobe Airport	Kōbe	Kansai	UKB/RJBE	2,706,397	20,202	20,555
15.	Matsuyama Airport	Matsuyama	Shikoku	MYJ/RJOM	2,574,224	31,464	10,093
16.	Nagasaki Airport	Nagasaki	Kyūshū	NGS/RJFU	2,524,159	42,570	19,176
17.	Komatsu Airport	Komatsu	Chūbu	KMQ/RJNK	2,411,634	14,372	19,866
18.	Ishigaki Airport	Ishigaki	Okinawa	ISG/ROIG	1,865,056	23,962	18,510
19.	Oita Airport	Ōita	Kyūshū	OIT/RJFO	1,757,263	17,396	14,779
20.	Hakodate Airport	Hakodate	Hokkaidō	HKD/RJCH	1,743,662	18,062	17,849
21.	Takamatsu Airport	Takamatsu	Shikoku	TAK/RJOT	1,487,762	14,714	12,240
22.	Okayama Airport	Okayama	Chūgoku	OKJ/RJOB	1,441,439	12,344	7,491
23.	Kōchi Airport	Kōchi, Kōchi	Shikoku	KCZ/RJOK	1,335,911	20,648	5,193
24.	Asahikawa Airport	Asahikawa	Hokkaidō	AKJ/RJEC	1,312,219	10,804	12,460
25.	Kitakyushu Airport	Kitakyūshū	Kyūshū	KKJ/RJFR	1,237,928	16,168	10,684
26.	Akita Airport	Akita	Tōhoku	AXT/RJSK	1,206,960	16,414	4,707
27.	Aomori Airport	Aomori	Tōhoku	AOJ/RJSA	1,161,285	11,292	7,155
28.	Toyama Airport	Toyama	Chūbu	TOY/RJNT	1,155,926	10,170	2,909
29.	Miyako Airport	Miyako-jima	Okinawa	MMY/ROMY	1,096,145	15,302	14,018
30.	Niigata Airport	Niigata	Chūbu	KIJ/RJSN	1,095,224	26,456	2,535
31.	Memanbetsu Airport	Ōzora	Hokkaidō	MMB/RJCM	917,631	10,584	4,192
32.	Yamaguchi Ube Airport	Yamaguchi/Ube	Chūgoku	UBJ/RJDC	872,088	6,928	4,264
33.	Tokushima Airport	Tokushima	Shikoku	TKS/RJOS	830,431	8,502	3,971
34.	Kushiro Airport	Kushiro	Hokkaidō	KUH/RJCK	804,501	12,918	5,421
35.	Izumo Airport	Izumo	Chūgoku	IZO/RJOC	763,969	12,466	2,390
36.	Obihiro Airport	Obihiro	Hokkaidō	OBO/RJCB	620,869	12,364	9,084
37.	Amami Airport	Amami	Kyūshū	ASJ/RJKA	557,644	11,780	2,439
38.	Miho-Yonago Airport	Yonago	Chūgoku	YGJ/RJOH	490,065	7,626	2,046
39.	Fukushima Airport	Fukushima	Tōhoku	FKS/RJSF	479,017	9,808	1,221
40.	Nagoya Airfield	Nagoya	Chūbu	NKM/RJNA	414,064	44,870	0
41.	Shonai Airport	Shōnai	Tōhoku	SYO/RJSY	403,346	4,968	1,286
42.	Hanamaki Airport	Hanamaki	Tōhoku	HNA/RJSI	371,860	8,318	1,286
43.	Okadama Airport	Sapporo	Hokkaidō	OKD/RJCO	357,236	20,478	42
44.	Tottori Airport	Tottori	Chūgoku	TTJ/RJOR	314,066	5,014	1,212
45.	Saga Airport	Saga	Kyūshū	HSG/RJFS	291,401	8,430	17,243
46.	Tsushima Airport	Tsushima	Kyūshū	TSJ/RJDT	277,637	6,434	590
47.	Misawa Airport	Misawa	Tōhoku	MSJ/RJSM	269,061	2,892	1,606
48.	Kumejima Airport	Kumejima	Okinawa	UEO/ROKJ	249,971	5,042	2,294
49.	Hachijojima Airport	Hachijō-jima	Kantō	HAC/RJTH	208,627	4,754	2,464
50.	Wakkanai Airport	Wakkanai	Hokkaidō	WKJ/RJCW	197,500	2,962	304

== 2007 final statistics ==
The 50 busiest airports in Japan in 2007 ordered by total passenger traffic, according to the MLIT reports.

Rank	Airport	City served	Region	IATA/ ICAO	Passengers	Aircraft	Cargo
1.	Haneda Airport	Tōkyō	Kantō	HND/RJTT	66,823,414	331,818	852,347
2.	Narita International Airport	Tōkyō	Kantō	NRT/RJAA	32,344,493	195,074	2,254,421
3.	New Chitose Airport	Sapporo	Hokkaidō	CTS/RJCC	18,329,412	102,434	274,271
4.	Fukuoka Airport	Fukuoka	Kyūshū	FUK/RJFF	17,889,693	142,912	292,693
5.	Kansai International Airport	Ōsaka	Kansai	KIX/RJBB	16,413,135	125,638	845,975
6.	Osaka International Airport	Ōsaka	Kansai	ITM/RJOO	16,238,849	127,818	155,992
7.	Naha Airport	Naha	Okinawa	OKA/ROAH	14,950,970	123,594	244,628
8.	Chūbu Centrair International Airport	Nagoya	Chūbu	NGO/RJGG	11,617,797	104,038	276,380
9.	Kagoshima Airport	Kagoshima	Kyūshū	KOJ/RJFK	5,596,210	65,704	48,802
10.	Sendai Airport	Sendai	Tōhoku	SDJ/RJSS	3,350,083	46,200	20,725
11.	Hiroshima Airport	Hiroshima	Chūgoku	HIJ/RJOA	3,325,960	21,332	29,280
12.	Kumamoto Airport	Kumamoto	Kyūshū	KMJ/RJFT	3,172,362	37,444	37,401
13.	Miyazaki Airport	Miyazaki	Kyūshū	KMI/RJFM	3,026,518	37,820	16,003
14.	Kobe Airport	Kōbe	Kansai	UKB/RJBE	2,964,163	21,220	21,930
15.	Matsuyama Airport	Matsuyama	Shikoku	MYJ/RJOM	2,708,631	31,018	12,214
16.	Nagasaki Airport	Nagasaki	Kyūshū	NGS/RJFU	2,631,212	45,106	20,146
17.	Komatsu Airport	Komatsu	Chūbu	KMQ/RJNK	2,466,061	15,006	23,145
18.	Ishigaki Airport	Ishigaki	Okinawa	ISG/ROIG	1,924,420	24,176	18,811
19.	Hakodate Airport	Hakodate	Hokkaidō	HKD/RJCH	1,901,532	19,264	20,172
20.	Oita Airport	Ōita	Kyūshū	OIT/RJFO	1,856,625	16,758	16,380
21.	Okayama Airport	Okayama	Chūgoku	OKJ/RJOB	1,547,912	12,074	6,706
22.	Takamatsu Airport	Takamatsu	Shikoku	TAK/RJOT	1,517,312	14,612	13,146
23.	Kōchi Airport	Kōchi, Kōchi	Shikoku	KCZ/RJOK	1,403,657	22,550	5,373
24.	Akita Airport	Akita	Tōhoku	AXT/RJSK	1,300,675	16,432	5,670
25.	Aomori Airport	Aomori	Tōhoku	AOJ/RJSA	1,271,852	11,510	7,540
26.	Toyama Airport	Toyama	Chūbu	TOY/RJNT	1,260,898	10,540	3,315
27.	Asahikawa Airport	Asahikawa	Hokkaidō	AKJ/RJEC	1,253,163	9,772	13,978
28.	Kitakyushu Airport	Kitakyūshū	Kyūshū	KKJ/RJFR	1,252,544	16,702	7,491
29.	Niigata Airport	Niigata	Chūbu	KIJ/RJSN	1,211,989	30,000	3,036
30.	Miyako Airport	Miyako-jima	Okinawa	MMY/ROMY	1,109,089	15,298	13,652
31.	Memanbetsu Airport	Ōzora	Hokkaidō	MMB/RJCM	972,325	11,486	4,728
32.	Yamaguchi Ube Airport	Yamaguchi/Ube	Chūgoku	UBJ/RJDC	900,021	7,168	4,599
33.	Kushiro Airport	Kushiro	Hokkaidō	KUH/RJCK	877,242	13,042	6,317
34.	Tokushima Airport	Tokushima	Shikoku	TKS/RJOS	870,028	8,486	4,236
35.	Izumo Airport	Izumo	Chūgoku	IZO/RJOC	747,647	12,114	2,197
36.	Obihiro Airport	Obihiro	Hokkaidō	OBO/RJCB	646,232	13,016	8,903
37.	Amami Airport	Amami	Kyūshū	ASJ/RJKA	584,915	11,944	2,442
38.	Fukushima Airport	Fukushima	Tōhoku	FKS/RJSF	515,459	10,172	1,368
39.	Miho-Yonago Airport	Yonago	Chūgoku	YGJ/RJOH	499,253	7,794	2,405
40.	Nagoya Airfield	Nagoya	Chūbu	NKM/RJNA	438,304	44,560	0
41.	Shonai Airport	Shōnai	Tōhoku	SYO/RJSY	419,300	5,148	1,367
42.	Hanamaki Airport	Hanamaki	Tōhoku	HNA/RJSI	412,273	8,306	1,498
43.	Okadama Airport	Sapporo	Hokkaidō	OKD/RJCO	372,622	20,662	61
44.	Tottori Airport	Tottori	Chūgoku	TTJ/RJOR	332,592	5,032	1,156
45.	Misawa Airport	Misawa	Tōhoku	MSJ/RJSM	306,866	3,428	1,820
46.	Tsushima Airport	Tsushima	Kyūshū	TSJ/RJDT	291,033	7,530	594
47.	Saga Airport	Saga	Kyūshū	HSG/RJFS	289,092	8,782	21,883
48.	Kumejima Airport	Kumejima	Okinawa	UEO/ROKJ	245,200	5,022	2,242
49.	Hachijojima Airport	Hachijō-jima	Kantō	HAC/RJTH	238,282	4,902	2,571
50.	Wakkanai Airport	Wakkanai	Hokkaidō	WKJ/RJCW	222,694	2,988	425

== 2006 final statistics ==
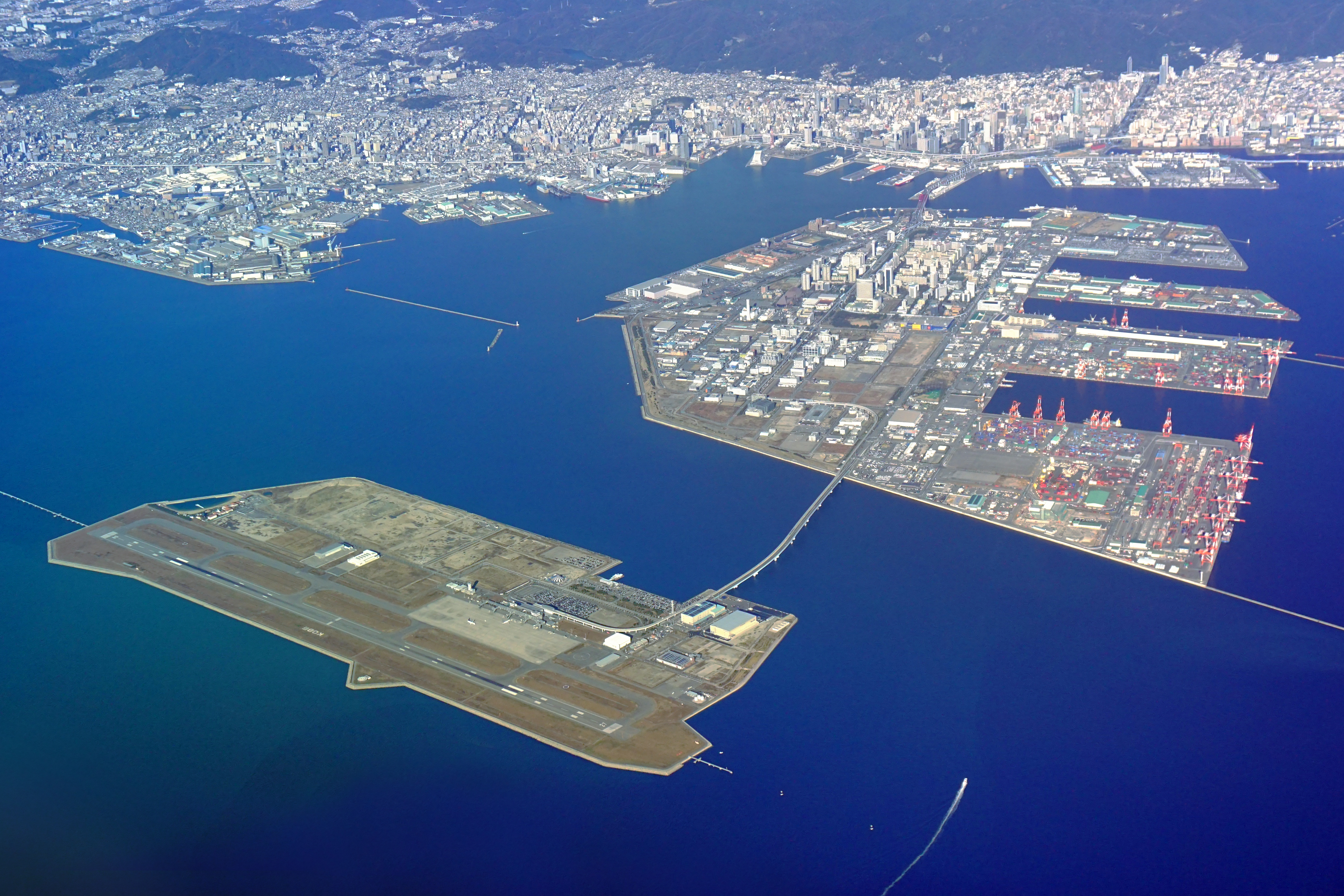
Kobe Airport is built on an artificial island. Inaugurated in 2006, that year was ranked as the 17th busiest airport in Japan.

The 50 busiest airports in Japan in 2006 ordered by total passenger traffic, according to the MLIT reports.

Rank	Airport	City served	Region	IATA/ ICAO	Passengers	Aircraft	Cargo
1.	Haneda Airport	Tōkyō	Kantō	HND/RJTT	66,089,277	324,050	837,265
2.	Narita International Airport	Tōkyō	Kantō	NRT/RJAA	31,735,733	190,138	2,280,829
3.	New Chitose Airport	Sapporo	Hokkaidō	CTS/RJCC	18,392,635	103,270	266,934
4.	Fukuoka Airport	Fukuoka	Kyūshū	FUK/RJFF	18,191,678	137,632	292,318
5.	Osaka International Airport	Ōsaka	Kansai	ITM/RJOO	17,050,440	130,826	166,539
6.	Kansai International Airport	Ōsaka	Kansai	KIX/RJBB	16,353,549	115,434	842,016
7.	Naha Airport	Naha	Okinawa	OKA/ROAH	14,172,504	116,384	237,633
8.	Chūbu Centrair International Airport	Nagoya	Chūbu	NGO/RJGG	11,652,700	107,486	306,884
9.	Kagoshima Airport	Kagoshima	Kyūshū	KOJ/RJFK	5,712,889	66,170	50,245
10.	Sendai Airport	Sendai	Tōhoku	SDJ/RJSS	3,336,314	47,804	22,880
11.	Hiroshima Airport	Hiroshima	Chūgoku	HIJ/RJOA	3,332,201	22,202	29,731
12.	Kumamoto Airport	Kumamoto	Kyūshū	KMJ/RJFT	3,137,184	37,178	36,838
13.	Miyazaki Airport	Miyazaki	Kyūshū	KMI/RJFM	3,081,863	37,258	16,099
14.	Matsuyama Airport	Matsuyama	Shikoku	MYJ/RJOM	2,725,614	32,324	11,648
15.	Nagasaki Airport	Nagasaki	Kyūshū	NGS/RJFU	2,641,228	46,536	21,059
16.	Komatsu Airport	Komatsu	Chūbu	KMQ/RJNK	2,541,446	15,292	27,578
17.	Kobe Airport	Kōbe	Kansai	UKB/RJBE	2,380,829	18,540	21,777
18.	Hakodate Airport	Hakodate	Hokkaidō	HKD/RJCH	2,019,140	21,042	20,558
19.	Ishigaki Airport	Ishigaki	Okinawa	ISG/ROIG	1,957,361	24,156	18,683
20.	Oita Airport	Ōita	Kyūshū	OIT/RJFO	1,875,381	17,992	15,941
21.	Okayama Airport	Okayama	Chūgoku	OKJ/RJOB	1,592,750	11,934	8,159
22.	Takamatsu Airport	Takamatsu	Shikoku	TAK/RJOT	1,509,138	14,290	13,387
23.	Kōchi Airport	Kōchi, Kōchi	Shikoku	KCZ/RJOK	1,497,688	23,502	5,106
24.	Akita Airport	Akita	Tōhoku	AXT/RJSK	1,329,676	15,686	6,526
25.	Toyama Airport	Toyama	Chūbu	TOY/RJNT	1,303,471	11,372	3,641
26.	Asahikawa Airport	Asahikawa	Hokkaidō	AKJ/RJEC	1,265,436	9,932	13,766
27.	Aomori Airport	Aomori	Tōhoku	AOJ/RJSA	1,254,325	11,704	7,796
28.	Niigata Airport	Niigata	Chūbu	KIJ/RJSN	1,242,760	29,956	3,162
29.	Miyako Airport	Miyako-jima	Okinawa	MMY/ROMY	1,119,120	15,600	13,151
30.	Kitakyushu Airport	Kitakyūshū	Kyūshū	KKJ/RJFR	1,107,896	16,124	3,479
31.	Memanbetsu Airport	Ōzora	Hokkaidō	MMB/RJCM	1,088,195	13,446	5,494
32.	Kushiro Airport	Kushiro	Hokkaidō	KUH/RJCK	909,704	12,942	7,307
33.	Yamaguchi Ube Airport	Yamaguchi/Ube	Chūgoku	UBJ/RJDC	909,512	7,536	4,654
34.	Tokushima Airport	Tokushima	Shikoku	TKS/RJOS	884,467	8,080	4,646
35.	Izumo Airport	Izumo	Chūgoku	IZO/RJOC	737,249	12,026	2,157
36.	Obihiro Airport	Obihiro	Hokkaidō	OBO/RJCB	644,304	13,936	9,758
37.	Amami Airport	Amami	Kyūshū	ASJ/RJKA	602,124	11,876	2,511
38.	Fukushima Airport	Fukushima	Tōhoku	FKS/RJSF	532,290	10,734	1,458
39.	Miho-Yonago Airport	Yonago	Chūgoku	YGJ/RJOH	495,208	7,774	2,354
40.	Hanamaki Airport	Hanamaki	Tōhoku	HNA/RJSI	452,384	8,814	1,471
41.	Shonai Airport	Shōnai	Tōhoku	SYO/RJSY	426,448	5,574	1,412
42.	Nagoya Airfield	Nagoya	Chūbu	NKM/RJNA	387,542	42,376	0
43.	Okadama Airport	Sapporo	Hokkaidō	OKD/RJCO	375,182	19,994	81
44.	Tottori Airport	Tottori	Chūgoku	TTJ/RJOR	339,228	5,698	1,234
45.	Misawa Airport	Misawa	Tōhoku	MSJ/RJSM	322,716	3,618	1,880
46.	Saga Airport	Saga	Kyūshū	HSG/RJFS	298,171	9,726	21,466
47.	Tsushima Airport	Tsushima	Kyūshū	TSJ/RJDT	296,983	7,632	627
48.	Kumejima Airport	Kumejima	Okinawa	UEO/ROKJ	248,041	4,820	2,308
49.	Hachijojima Airport	Hachijō-jima	Kantō	HAC/RJTH	234,857	4,922	2,745
50.	Wakkanai Airport	Wakkanai	Hokkaidō	WKJ/RJCW	229,679	3,280	505

== 2005 final statistics ==
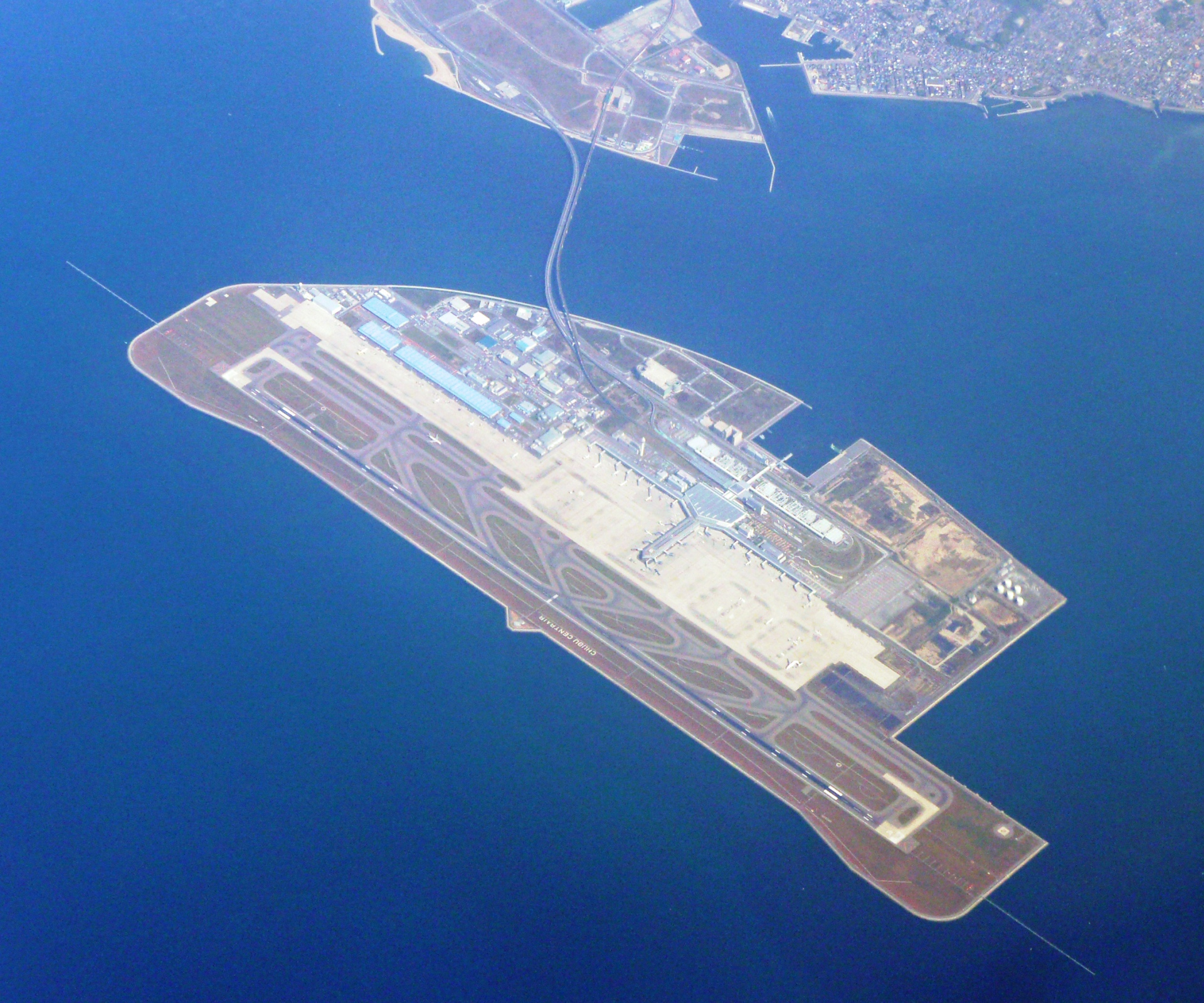
Chūbu Centrair International Airport, serving Nagoya, is also built on an artificial island. Since its opening in 2005, Centrair became one of the most important airports in the country.

The 50 busiest airports in Japan in 2005 ordered by total passenger traffic, according to the MLIT reports.

Rank	Airport	City served	Region	IATA/ ICAO	Passengers	Aircraft	Cargo
1.	Haneda Airport	Tōkyō	Kantō	HND/RJTT	63,303,843	309,080	798,672
2.	Narita International Airport	Tōkyō	Kantō	NRT/RJAA	31,372,531	189,492	2,292,103
3.	Osaka International Airport	Ōsaka	Kansai	ITM/RJOO	18,948,300	132,518	182,012
4.	Fukuoka Airport	Fukuoka	Kyūshū	FUK/RJFF	18,651,670	137,510	289,968
5.	New Chitose Airport	Sapporo	Hokkaidō	CTS/RJCC	17,871,752	98,540	268,211
6.	Kansai International Airport	Ōsaka	Kansai	KIX/RJBB	16,278,653	111,680	869,476
7.	Naha Airport	Naha	Okinawa	OKA/ROAH	13,494,406	115,140	233,271
8.	Chūbu Centrair International Airport	Nagoya	Chūbu	NGO/RJGG	10,763,581	92,086	236,554
9.	Kagoshima Airport	Kagoshima	Kyūshū	KOJ/RJFK	5,714,196	65,056	51,686
10.	Hiroshima Airport	Hiroshima	Chūgoku	HIJ/RJOA	3,275,899	22,068	30,809
11.	Sendai Airport	Sendai	Tōhoku	SDJ/RJSS	3,232,418	47,850	22,468
12.	Kumamoto Airport	Kumamoto	Kyūshū	KMJ/RJFT	3,125,270	36,144	33,187
13.	Miyazaki Airport	Miyazaki	Kyūshū	KMI/RJFM	3,098,481	36,382	17,325
14.	Matsuyama Airport	Matsuyama	Shikoku	MYJ/RJOM	2,682,770	31,166	11,963
15.	Nagasaki Airport	Nagasaki	Kyūshū	NGS/RJFU	2,616,316	44,650	21,567
16.	Komatsu Airport	Komatsu	Chūbu	KMQ/RJNK	2,471,111	15,158	30,511
17.	Hakodate Airport	Hakodate	Hokkaidō	HKD/RJCH	2,092,662	21,446	20,279
18.	Ishigaki Airport	Ishigaki	Okinawa	ISG/ROIG	1,864,467	24,560	17,666
19.	Oita Airport	Ōita	Kyūshū	OIT/RJFO	1,863,315	17,484	15,389
20.	Okayama Airport	Okayama	Chūgoku	OKJ/RJOB	1,589,071	12,490	8,123
21.	Nagoya Airfield	Nagoya	Chūbu	NKM/RJNA	1,563,230	48,104	20,599
22.	Kōchi Airport	Kōchi, Kōchi	Shikoku	KCZ/RJOK	1,537,585	24,588	5,232
23.	Takamatsu Airport	Takamatsu	Shikoku	TAK/RJOT	1,485,652	14,796	12,351
24.	Toyama Airport	Toyama	Chūbu	TOY/RJNT	1,356,478	11,566	3,313
25.	Akita Airport	Akita	Tōhoku	AXT/RJSK	1,349,774	15,344	5,653
26.	Aomori Airport	Aomori	Tōhoku	AOJ/RJSA	1,274,200	11,104	7,481
27.	Niigata Airport	Niigata	Chūbu	KIJ/RJSN	1,249,580	27,658	3,063
28.	Asahikawa Airport	Asahikawa	Hokkaidō	AKJ/RJEC	1,184,550	9,478	12,473
29.	Miyako Airport	Miyako-jima	Okinawa	MMY/ROMY	1,093,834	15,440	12,486
30.	Memanbetsu Airport	Ōzora	Hokkaidō	MMB/RJCM	1,015,350	11,144	5,206
31.	Tokushima Airport	Tokushima	Shikoku	TKS/RJOS	961,562	9,054	4,968
32.	Kushiro Airport	Kushiro	Hokkaidō	KUH/RJCK	952,193	13,510	7,296
33.	Yamaguchi Ube Airport	Yamaguchi/Ube	Chūgoku	UBJ/RJDC	932,223	7,694	4,940
34.	Izumo Airport	Izumo	Chūgoku	IZO/RJOC	721,395	11,530	2,216
35.	Obihiro Airport	Obihiro	Hokkaidō	OBO/RJCB	681,052	14,266	10,479
36.	Amami Airport	Amami	Kyūshū	ASJ/RJKA	602,994	12,102	2,593
37.	Fukushima Airport	Fukushima	Tōhoku	FKS/RJSF	552,464	11,224	1,587
38.	Hanamaki Airport	Hanamaki	Tōhoku	HNA/RJSI	506,012	8,792	1,449
39.	Miho-Yonago Airport	Yonago	Chūgoku	YGJ/RJOH	476,392	7,202	2,450
40.	Shonai Airport	Shōnai	Tōhoku	SYO/RJSY	409,207	5,366	1,131
41.	Okadama Airport	Sapporo	Hokkaidō	OKD/RJCO	370,242	19,806	75
42.	Misawa Airport	Misawa	Tōhoku	MSJ/RJSM	337,511	3,602	1,938
43.	Tottori Airport	Tottori	Chūgoku	TTJ/RJOR	337,202	5,220	1,275
44.	Tsushima Airport	Tsushima	Kyūshū	TSJ/RJDT	315,587	6,768	709
45.	Kitakyushu Airport	Kitakyūshū	Kyūshū	KKJ/RJFR	313,752	6,644	375
46.	Kumejima Airport	Kumejima	Okinawa	UEO/ROKJ	267,162	4,746	2,333
47.	Saga Airport	Saga	Kyūshū	HSG/RJFS	263,858	8,344	10,011
48.	Wakkanai Airport	Wakkanai	Hokkaidō	WKJ/RJCW	239,177	3,416	614
49.	Hachijojima Airport	Hachijō-jima	Kantō	HAC/RJTH	225,212	4,836	2,961
50.	Nakashibetsu Airport	Nakashibetsu	Hokkaidō	SHB/RJCN	223,101	3,766	291

== 2004 final statistics ==
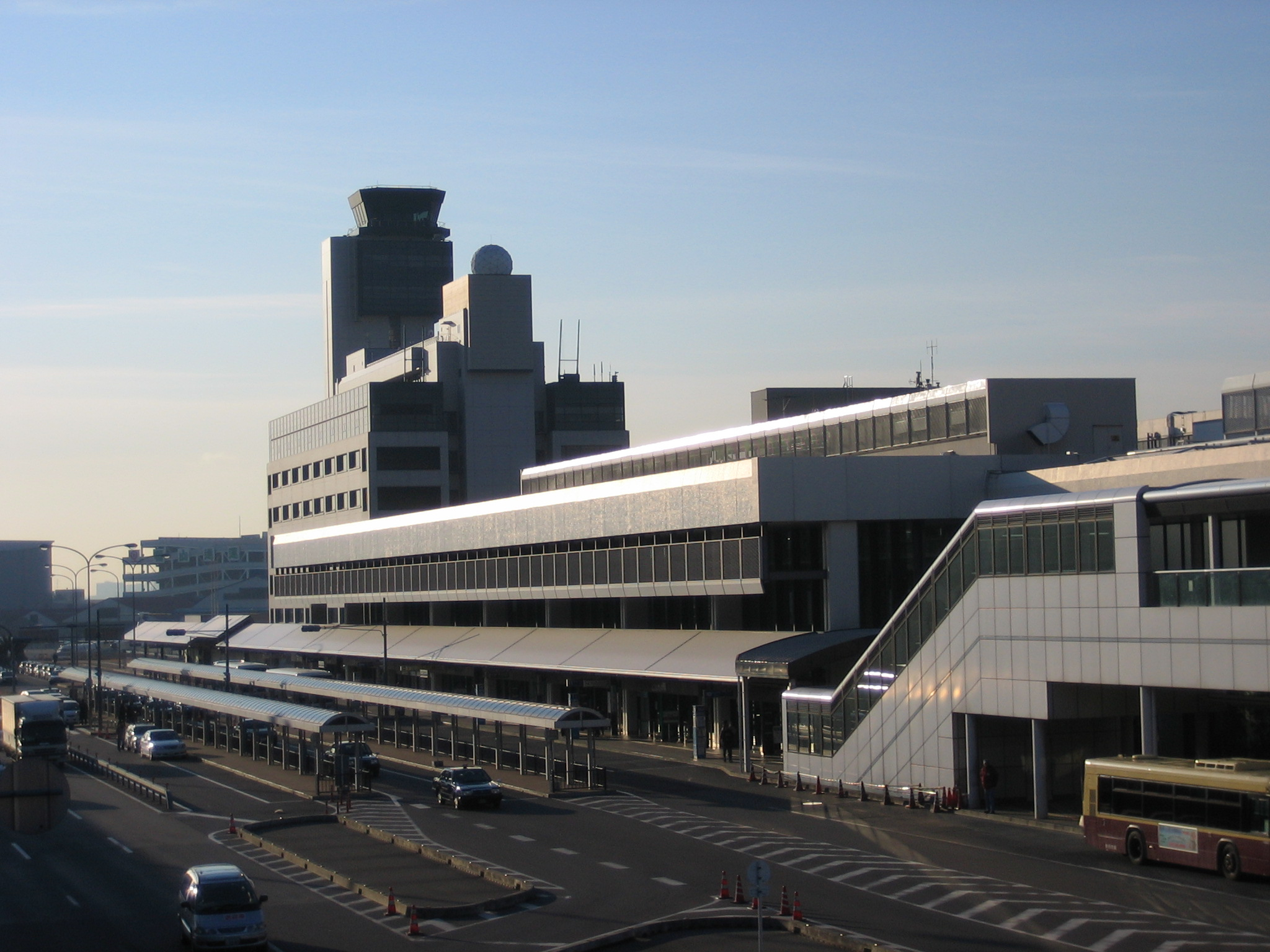
Osaka International Airport, also named Itami Airport currently doesn't have international routes, but it has become Japan's busiest only-domestic airport. In 2004, Itami Airport was the third busiest in the country.

The 50 busiest airports in Japan in 2004 ordered by total passenger traffic, according to the MLIT reports.

Rank	Airport	City served	Region	IATA/ ICAO	Passengers	Aircraft	Cargo
1.	Haneda Airport	Tōkyō	Kantō	HND/RJTT	62,291,405	305,346	774,116
2.	Narita International Airport	Tōkyō	Kantō	NRT/RJAA	30,976,701	186,312	2,373,157
3.	Osaka International Airport	Ōsaka	Kansai	ITM/RJOO	19,316,582	127,404	188,855
4.	Fukuoka Airport	Fukuoka	Kyūshū	FUK/RJFF	18,510,486	135,976	289,817
5.	New Chitose Airport	Sapporo	Hokkaidō	CTS/RJCC	17,605,502	96,540	265,979
6.	Kansai International Airport	Ōsaka	Kansai	KIX/RJBB	15,111,563	102,974	887,727
7.	Naha Airport	Naha	Okinawa	OKA/ROAH	12,732,720	114,518	230,515
8.	Nagoya Airfield	Nagoya	Chūbu	NKM/RJNA	10,695,160	124,836	190,884
9.	Kagoshima Airport	Kagoshima	Kyūshū	KOJ/RJFK	5,810,884	67,996	49,204
10.	Hiroshima Airport	Hiroshima	Chūgoku	HIJ/RJOA	3,304,658	21,364	31,561
11.	Sendai Airport	Sendai	Tōhoku	SDJ/RJSS	3,222,084	47,034	23,727
12.	Miyazaki Airport	Miyazaki	Kyūshū	KMI/RJFM	3,082,042	36,476	17,076
13.	Kumamoto Airport	Kumamoto	Kyūshū	KMJ/RJFT	3,049,281	36,518	31,487
14.	Nagasaki Airport	Nagasaki	Kyūshū	NGS/RJFU	2,637,308	45,290	22,101
15.	Matsuyama Airport	Matsuyama	Shikoku	MYJ/RJOM	2,626,757	27,066	12,801
16.	Komatsu Airport	Komatsu	Chūbu	KMQ/RJNK	2,498,037	14,914	30,762
17.	Hakodate Airport	Hakodate	Hokkaidō	HKD/RJCH	2,188,334	21,302	21,493
18.	Oita Airport	Ōita	Kyūshū	OIT/RJFO	1,878,604	17,872	16,946
19.	Ishigaki Airport	Ishigaki	Okinawa	ISG/ROIG	1,785,532	24,976	17,472
20.	Okayama Airport	Okayama	Chūgoku	OKJ/RJOB	1,580,917	13,682	8,884
21.	Kōchi Airport	Kōchi, Kōchi	Shikoku	KCZ/RJOK	1,575,679	23,784	5,177
22.	Takamatsu Airport	Takamatsu	Shikoku	TAK/RJOT	1,506,902	15,686	12,151
23.	Niigata Airport	Niigata	Chūbu	KIJ/RJSN	1,445,166	30,892	3,396
24.	Toyama Airport	Toyama	Chūbu	TOY/RJNT	1,380,660	12,076	2,974
25.	Akita Airport	Akita	Tōhoku	AXT/RJSK	1,343,281	15,174	5,740
26.	Aomori Airport	Aomori	Tōhoku	AOJ/RJSA	1,301,395	11,648	8,299
27.	Asahikawa Airport	Asahikawa	Hokkaidō	AKJ/RJEC	1,117,902	9,074	12,586
28.	Miyako Airport	Miyako-jima	Okinawa	MMY/ROMY	1,078,840	15,580	12,605
29.	Memanbetsu Airport	Ōzora	Hokkaidō	MMB/RJCM	995,805	10,610	6,020
30.	Tokushima Airport	Tokushima	Shikoku	TKS/RJOS	956,923	9,532	4,035
31.	Yamaguchi Ube Airport	Yamaguchi/Ube	Chūgoku	UBJ/RJDC	927,021	7,442	5,152
32.	Kushiro Airport	Kushiro	Hokkaidō	KUH/RJCK	923,681	13,630	7,737
33.	Izumo Airport	Izumo	Chūgoku	IZO/RJOC	750,931	12,738	2,123
34.	Obihiro Airport	Obihiro	Hokkaidō	OBO/RJCB	657,750	13,040	9,883
35.	Amami Airport	Amami	Kyūshū	ASJ/RJKA	606,783	12,070	2,684
36.	Fukushima Airport	Fukushima	Tōhoku	FKS/RJSF	565,737	8,646	2,039
37.	Hanamaki Airport	Hanamaki	Tōhoku	HNA/RJSI	475,081	8,548	1,580
38.	Miho-Yonago Airport	Yonago	Chūgoku	YGJ/RJOH	473,780	7,216	2,167
39.	Shonai Airport	Shōnai	Tōhoku	SYO/RJSY	422,517	5,286	1,099
40.	Okadama Airport	Sapporo	Hokkaidō	OKD/RJCO	380,605	20,950	81
41.	Tottori Airport	Tottori	Chūgoku	TTJ/RJOR	354,009	5,164	1,507
42.	Misawa Airport	Misawa	Tōhoku	MSJ/RJSM	341,885	3,438	2,019
43.	Tsushima Airport	Tsushima	Kyūshū	TSJ/RJDT	334,083	7,054	709
44.	Saga Airport	Saga	Kyūshū	HSG/RJFS	289,450	9,138	5,060
45.	Kitakyushu Airport	Kitakyūshū	Kyūshū	KKJ/RJFR	287,360	7,228	292
46.	Kumejima Airport	Kumejima	Okinawa	UEO/ROKJ	265,913	4,626	2,408
47.	Wakkanai Airport	Wakkanai	Hokkaidō	WKJ/RJCW	255,111	4,210	640
48.	Hachijojima Airport	Hachijō-jima	Kantō	HAC/RJTH	229,238	5,080	2,956
49.	Yamagata Airport	Yamagata	Tōhoku	GAJ/RJSC	216,565	7,754	230
50.	Nakashibetsu Airport	Nakashibetsu	Hokkaidō	SHB/RJCN	213,273	3,810	314

== 2003 final statistics ==
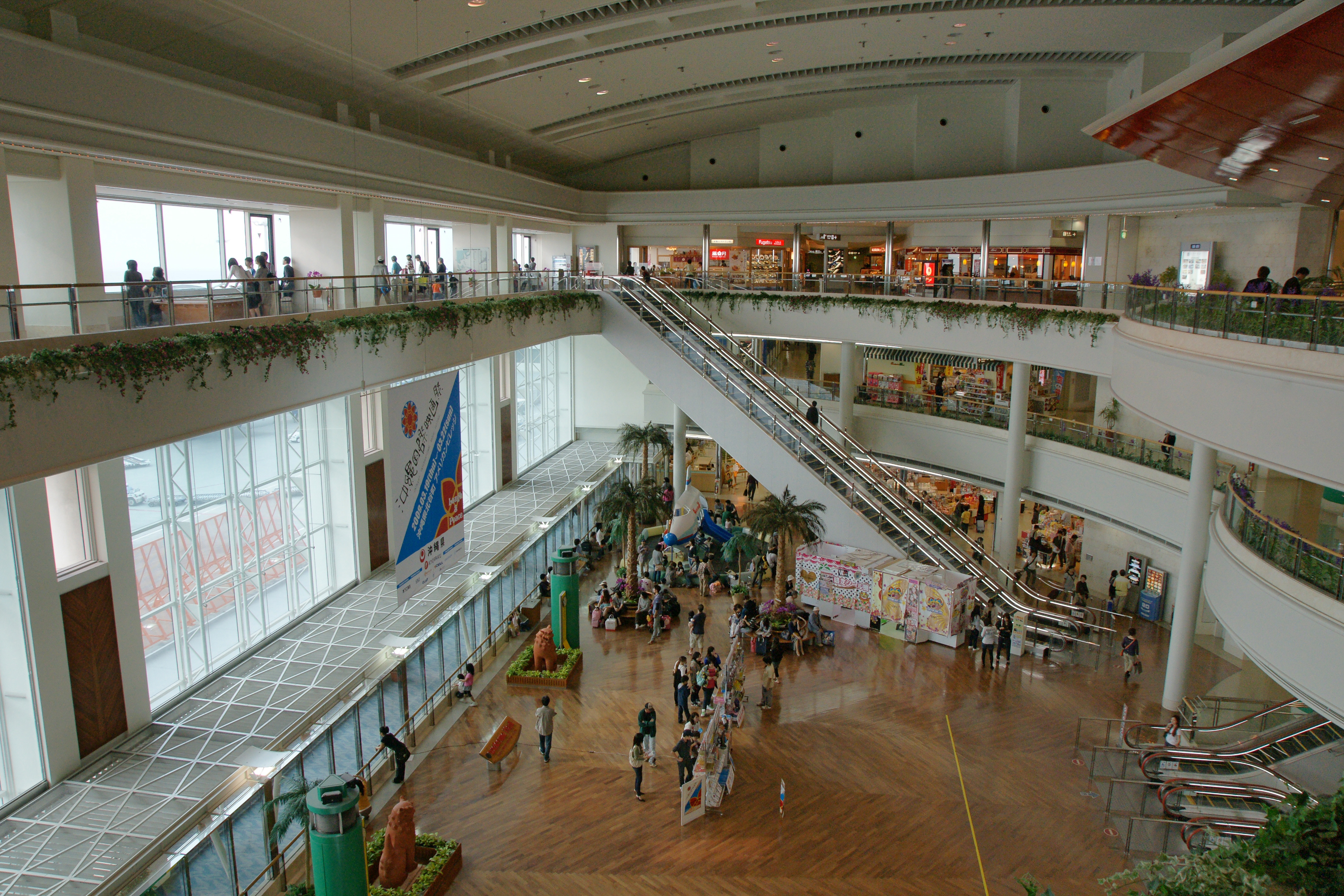
Naha Airport is the busiest airport in Okinawa Prefecture, with a traffic of more than ten million passengers per year.

The 50 busiest airports in Japan in 2003 ordered by total passenger traffic, according to the MLIT reports.

Rank	Airport	City served	Region	IATA/ ICAO	Passengers	Aircraft	Cargo
1.	Haneda Airport	Tōkyō	Kantō	HND/RJTT	62,876,182	298,912	722,736
2.	Narita International Airport	Tōkyō	Kantō	NRT/RJAA	26,537,406	171,740	2,154,693
3.	Fukuoka Airport	Fukuoka	Kyūshū	FUK/RJFF	18,837,600	136,008	266,740
4.	Osaka International Airport	Ōsaka	Kansai	ITM/RJOO	18,829,733	115,176	169,753
5.	New Chitose Airport	Sapporo	Hokkaidō	CTS/RJCC	18,457,467	99,918	256,945
6.	Kansai International Airport	Ōsaka	Kansai	KIX/RJBB	14,080,107	100,884	793,480
7.	Naha Airport	Naha	Okinawa	OKA/ROAH	12,544,777	115,670	220,092
8.	Nagoya Airfield	Nagoya	Chūbu	NKM/RJNA	9,799,768	119,874	172,714
9.	Kagoshima Airport	Kagoshima	Kyūshū	KOJ/RJFK	6,224,803	70,494	46,425
10.	Hiroshima Airport	Hiroshima	Chūgoku	HIJ/RJOA	3,362,316	21,088	30,139
11.	Miyazaki Airport	Miyazaki	Kyūshū	KMI/RJFM	3,225,752	36,564	18,424
12.	Sendai Airport	Sendai	Tōhoku	SDJ/RJSS	3,191,501	46,504	23,458
13.	Kumamoto Airport	Kumamoto	Kyūshū	KMJ/RJFT	3,053,818	35,632	31,581
14.	Nagasaki Airport	Nagasaki	Kyūshū	NGS/RJFU	2,834,288	46,662	20,838
15.	Matsuyama Airport	Matsuyama	Shikoku	MYJ/RJOM	2,672,405	26,338	13,105
16.	Komatsu Airport	Komatsu	Chūbu	KMQ/RJNK	2,601,778	14,580	26,741
17.	Hakodate Airport	Hakodate	Hokkaidō	HKD/RJCH	2,375,018	23,554	21,412
18.	Oita Airport	Ōita	Kyūshū	OIT/RJFO	1,987,960	17,092	17,324
19.	Ishigaki Airport	Ishigaki	Okinawa	ISG/ROIG	1,755,730	23,324	15,905
20.	Kōchi Airport	Kōchi, Kōchi	Shikoku	KCZ/RJOK	1,694,472	20,856	5,598
21.	Okayama Airport	Okayama	Chūgoku	OKJ/RJOB	1,583,308	13,188	9,621
22.	Takamatsu Airport	Takamatsu	Shikoku	TAK/RJOT	1,532,591	16,130	11,323
23.	Aomori Airport	Aomori	Tōhoku	AOJ/RJSA	1,462,054	13,102	7,721
24.	Toyama Airport	Toyama	Chūbu	TOY/RJNT	1,353,768	12,028	2,924
25.	Akita Airport	Akita	Tōhoku	AXT/RJSK	1,349,791	14,714	5,804
26.	Niigata Airport	Niigata	Chūbu	KIJ/RJSN	1,263,816	26,646	3,403
27.	Asahikawa Airport	Asahikawa	Hokkaidō	AKJ/RJEC	1,095,253	9,570	12,802
28.	Memanbetsu Airport	Ōzora	Hokkaidō	MMB/RJCM	1,084,811	11,294	7,693
29.	Miyako Airport	Miyako-jima	Okinawa	MMY/ROMY	1,042,705	17,598	12,776
30.	Yamaguchi Ube Airport	Yamaguchi/Ube	Chūgoku	UBJ/RJDC	982,612	7,584	5,077
31.	Kushiro Airport	Kushiro	Hokkaidō	KUH/RJCK	979,014	13,582	8,916
32.	Tokushima Airport	Tokushima	Shikoku	TKS/RJOS	946,568	8,838	3,763
33.	Izumo Airport	Izumo	Chūgoku	IZO/RJOC	778,488	13,180	2,125
34.	Obihiro Airport	Obihiro	Hokkaidō	OBO/RJCB	665,576	10,778	9,034
35.	Amami Airport	Amami	Kyūshū	ASJ/RJKA	639,802	12,272	2,757
36.	Fukushima Airport	Fukushima	Tōhoku	FKS/RJSF	557,165	8,442	2,142
37.	Hanamaki Airport	Hanamaki	Tōhoku	HNA/RJSI	504,364	8,294	2,068
38.	Miho-Yonago Airport	Yonago	Chūgoku	YGJ/RJOH	445,873	7,164	1,788
39.	Shonai Airport	Shōnai	Tōhoku	SYO/RJSY	394,869	4,960	1,199
40.	Misawa Airport	Misawa	Tōhoku	MSJ/RJSM	387,833	3,550	2,264
41.	Okadama Airport	Sapporo	Hokkaidō	OKD/RJCO	352,086	19,706	175
42.	Tsushima Airport	Tsushima	Kyūshū	TSJ/RJDT	350,065	5,922	780
43.	Tottori Airport	Tottori	Chūgoku	TTJ/RJOR	324,426	4,534	1,464
44.	Saga Airport	Saga	Kyūshū	HSG/RJFS	306,133	7,948	738
45.	Kitakyushu Airport	Kitakyūshū	Kyūshū	KKJ/RJFR	272,815	6,508	234
46.	Kumejima Airport	Kumejima	Okinawa	UEO/ROKJ	266,772	4,766	2,327
47.	Wakkanai Airport	Wakkanai	Hokkaidō	WKJ/RJCW	259,274	6,410	717
48.	Yamagata Airport	Yamagata	Tōhoku	GAJ/RJSC	243,445	7,268	649
49.	Hachijojima Airport	Hachijō-jima	Kantō	HAC/RJTH	239,321	4,976	2,872
50.	Nakashibetsu Airport	Nakashibetsu	Hokkaidō	SHB/RJCN	207,682	3,308	401

== 2002 final statistics ==
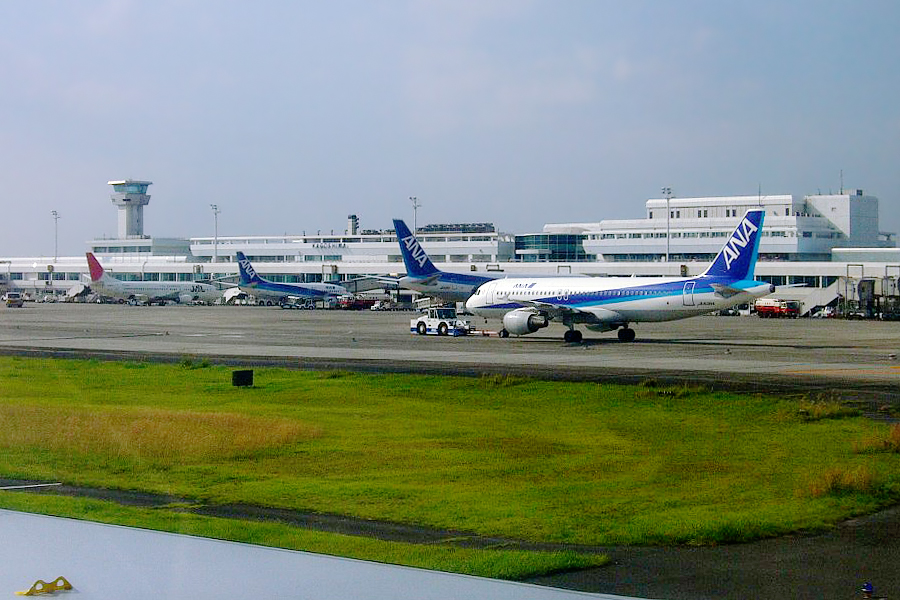
Kagoshima Airport usually appears in the top 10 of the busiest airports in Japan, reaching a passenger high in 2002.

The 50 busiest airports in Japan in 2002 ordered by total passenger traffic, according to the MLIT reports.

Rank	Airport	City served	Region	IATA/ ICAO	Passengers	Aircraft	Cargo
1.	Haneda Airport	Tōkyō	Kantō	HND/RJTT	61,079,478	282,674	707,300
2.	Narita International Airport	Tōkyō	Kantō	NRT/RJAA	28,883,606	164,270	2,001,824
3.	Fukuoka Airport	Fukuoka	Kyūshū	FUK/RJFF	19,493,169	139,734	272,959
4.	New Chitose Airport	Sapporo	Hokkaidō	CTS/RJCC	18,835,196	99,096	248,552
5.	Osaka International Airport	Ōsaka	Kansai	ITM/RJOO	17,627,571	104,818	153,399
6.	Kansai International Airport	Ōsaka	Kansai	KIX/RJBB	17,381,464	111,462	805,428
7.	Naha Airport	Naha	Okinawa	OKA/ROAH	11,886,263	111,662	211,988
8.	Nagoya Airfield	Nagoya	Chūbu	NKM/RJNA	10,524,102	118,826	189,203
9.	Kagoshima Airport	Kagoshima	Kyūshū	KOJ/RJFK	6,261,349	72,402	45,766
10.	Hiroshima Airport	Hiroshima	Chūgoku	HIJ/RJOA	3,439,088	22,250	28,556
11.	Miyazaki Airport	Miyazaki	Kyūshū	KMI/RJFM	3,329,087	41,106	22,196
12.	Sendai Airport	Sendai	Tōhoku	SDJ/RJSS	3,223,478	45,962	24,962
13.	Kumamoto Airport	Kumamoto	Kyūshū	KMJ/RJFT	2,863,564	33,282	28,417
14.	Nagasaki Airport	Nagasaki	Kyūshū	NGS/RJFU	2,853,499	44,942	20,754
15.	Matsuyama Airport	Matsuyama	Shikoku	MYJ/RJOM	2,687,850	23,500	13,252
16.	Komatsu Airport	Komatsu	Chūbu	KMQ/RJNK	2,644,936	14,766	29,317
17.	Hakodate Airport	Hakodate	Hokkaidō	HKD/RJCH	2,432,822	23,628	20,404
18.	Oita Airport	Ōita	Kyūshū	OIT/RJFO	2,001,657	17,546	17,498
19.	Kōchi Airport	Kōchi, Kōchi	Shikoku	KCZ/RJOK	1,770,980	25,044	6,716
20.	Aomori Airport	Aomori	Tōhoku	AOJ/RJSA	1,603,724	13,714	7,191
21.	Takamatsu Airport	Takamatsu	Shikoku	TAK/RJOT	1,560,342	18,448	10,547
22.	Ishigaki Airport	Ishigaki	Okinawa	ISG/ROIG	1,504,927	19,940	14,657
23.	Akita Airport	Akita	Tōhoku	AXT/RJSK	1,325,030	13,250	6,093
24.	Okayama Airport	Okayama	Chūgoku	OKJ/RJOB	1,319,627	11,336	9,787
25.	Toyama Airport	Toyama	Chūbu	TOY/RJNT	1,302,766	11,948	3,564
26.	Niigata Airport	Niigata	Chūbu	KIJ/RJSN	1,269,039	26,446	3,657
27.	Asahikawa Airport	Asahikawa	Hokkaidō	AKJ/RJEC	1,066,845	9,682	14,982
28.	Memanbetsu Airport	Ōzora	Hokkaidō	MMB/RJCM	1,060,205	10,470	7,424
29.	Miyako Airport	Miyako-jima	Okinawa	MMY/ROMY	1,019,108	18,124	12,924
30.	Kushiro Airport	Kushiro	Hokkaidō	KUH/RJCK	948,612	12,892	8,778
31.	Tokushima Airport	Tokushima	Shikoku	TKS/RJOS	935,946	9,150	3,913
32.	Yamaguchi Ube Airport	Yamaguchi/Ube	Chūgoku	UBJ/RJDC	859,936	6,236	4,351
33.	Izumo Airport	Izumo	Chūgoku	IZO/RJOC	766,022	13,756	2,127
34.	Obihiro Airport	Obihiro	Hokkaidō	OBO/RJCB	709,084	12,218	10,039
35.	Amami Airport	Amami	Kyūshū	ASJ/RJKA	627,646	12,092	2,756
36.	Fukushima Airport	Fukushima	Tōhoku	FKS/RJSF	611,148	9,326	2,282
37.	Misawa Airport	Misawa	Tōhoku	MSJ/RJSM	555,722	4,214	2,931
38.	Hanamaki Airport	Hanamaki	Tōhoku	HNA/RJSI	514,391	8,132	2,076
39.	Miho-Yonago Airport	Yonago	Chūgoku	YGJ/RJOH	445,285	6,644	1,793
40.	Shonai Airport	Shōnai	Tōhoku	SYO/RJSY	379,800	4,630	1,168
41.	Tsushima Airport	Tsushima	Kyūshū	TSJ/RJDT	354,967	5,420	786
42.	Okadama Airport	Sapporo	Hokkaidō	OKD/RJCO	323,046	18,144	378
43.	Tottori Airport	Tottori	Chūgoku	TTJ/RJOR	321,720	4,066	1,677
44.	Saga Airport	Saga	Kyūshū	HSG/RJFS	311,809	8,582	725
45.	Wakkanai Airport	Wakkanai	Hokkaidō	WKJ/RJCW	300,261	5,158	705
46.	Yamagata Airport	Yamagata	Tōhoku	GAJ/RJSC	282,854	5,950	1,546
47.	Hachijojima Airport	Hachijō-jima	Kantō	HAC/RJTH	261,881	4,910	2,926
48.	Kumejima Airport	Kumejima	Okinawa	UEO/ROKJ	253,176	4,452	2,240
49.	Kitakyushu Airport	Kitakyūshū	Kyūshū	KKJ/RJFR	239,870	6,746	194
50.	Nakashibetsu Airport	Nakashibetsu	Hokkaidō	SHB/RJCN	225,344	3,992	389

== 2001 final statistics ==
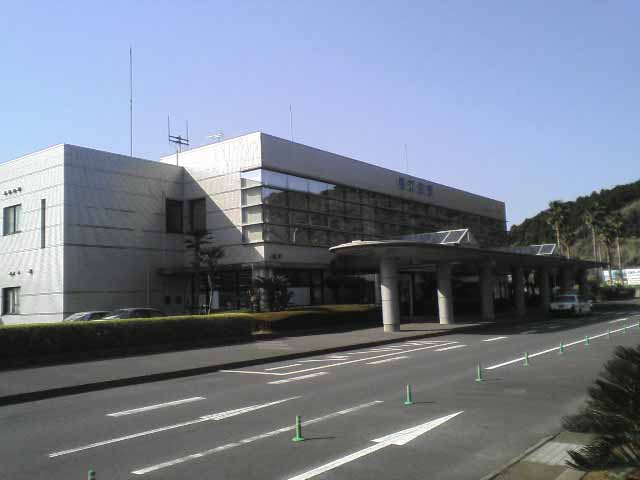
Fukue Airport appeared for the last time in the top 50 airports ranking in 2001. The airport currently receives 135,000 passengers per year.

The 50 busiest airports in Japan in 2001 ordered by total passenger traffic, according to the MLIT reports.

Rank	Airport	City served	Region	IATA/ ICAO	Passengers	Aircraft	Cargo
1.	Haneda Airport	Tōkyō	Kantō	HND/RJTT	58,692,688	270,404	725,125
2.	Narita International Airport	Tōkyō	Kantō	NRT/RJAA	25,379,370	131,850	1,680,935
3.	Fukuoka Airport	Fukuoka	Kyūshū	FUK/RJFF	19,454,529	143,074	275,356
4.	Kansai International Airport	Ōsaka	Kansai	KIX/RJBB	19,364,888	123,330	871,160
5.	New Chitose Airport	Sapporo	Hokkaidō	CTS/RJCC	18,405,090	97,884	262,276
6.	Osaka International Airport	Ōsaka	Kansai	ITM/RJOO	16,877,207	102,054	159,521
7.	Naha Airport	Naha	Okinawa	OKA/ROAH	11,027,498	114,386	205,802
8.	Nagoya Airfield	Nagoya	Chūbu	NKM/RJNA	10,580,972	119,346	172,649
9.	Kagoshima Airport	Kagoshima	Kyūshū	KOJ/RJFK	6,063,987	70,392	44,314
10.	Hiroshima Airport	Hiroshima	Chūgoku	HIJ/RJOA	3,343,230	21,870	31,071
11.	Miyazaki Airport	Miyazaki	Kyūshū	KMI/RJFM	3,343,080	42,100	22,453
12.	Sendai Airport	Sendai	Tōhoku	SDJ/RJSS	3,243,803	45,576	28,659
13.	Nagasaki Airport	Nagasaki	Kyūshū	NGS/RJFU	2,846,611	45,230	23,157
14.	Kumamoto Airport	Kumamoto	Kyūshū	KMJ/RJFT	2,769,086	32,704	27,447
15.	Matsuyama Airport	Matsuyama	Shikoku	MYJ/RJOM	2,664,555	23,750	13,269
16.	Komatsu Airport	Komatsu	Chūbu	KMQ/RJNK	2,591,615	15,514	30,049
17.	Hakodate Airport	Hakodate	Hokkaidō	HKD/RJCH	2,394,405	24,318	21,130
18.	Oita Airport	Ōita	Kyūshū	OIT/RJFO	1,995,239	16,896	15,848
19.	Kōchi Airport	Kōchi, Kōchi	Shikoku	KCZ/RJOK	1,822,334	26,728	7,013
20.	Takamatsu Airport	Takamatsu	Shikoku	TAK/RJOT	1,589,181	18,756	11,639
21.	Aomori Airport	Aomori	Tōhoku	AOJ/RJSA	1,548,747	13,218	7,237
22.	Ishigaki Airport	Ishigaki	Okinawa	ISG/ROIG	1,438,662	19,862	14,567
23.	Akita Airport	Akita	Tōhoku	AXT/RJSK	1,313,745	13,372	6,708
24.	Niigata Airport	Niigata	Chūbu	KIJ/RJSN	1,257,964	26,070	8,819
25.	Toyama Airport	Toyama	Chūbu	TOY/RJNT	1,164,138	11,502	3,330
26.	Memanbetsu Airport	Ōzora	Hokkaidō	MMB/RJCM	1,063,786	10,450	6,862
27.	Okayama Airport	Okayama	Chūgoku	OKJ/RJOB	1,033,339	10,074	7,488
28.	Miyako Airport	Miyako-jima	Okinawa	MMY/ROMY	1,010,881	16,358	12,102
29.	Asahikawa Airport	Asahikawa	Hokkaidō	AKJ/RJEC	989,610	9,710	15,520
30.	Tokushima Airport	Tokushima	Shikoku	TKS/RJOS	987,231	11,602	4,168
31.	Kushiro Airport	Kushiro	Hokkaidō	KUH/RJCK	945,367	12,596	8,246
32.	Yamaguchi Ube Airport	Yamaguchi/Ube	Chūgoku	UBJ/RJDC	737,427	5,838	3,576
33.	Izumo Airport	Izumo	Chūgoku	IZO/RJOC	725,406	12,650	2,148
34.	Obihiro Airport	Obihiro	Hokkaidō	OBO/RJCB	698,866	10,818	10,304
35.	Fukushima Airport	Fukushima	Tōhoku	FKS/RJSF	666,016	10,278	2,692
36.	Amami Airport	Amami	Kyūshū	ASJ/RJKA	627,604	12,308	2,808
37.	Misawa Airport	Misawa	Tōhoku	MSJ/RJSM	583,492	4,276	2,939
38.	Hanamaki Airport	Hanamaki	Tōhoku	HNA/RJSI	512,047	8,578	2,214
39.	Miho-Yonago Airport	Yonago	Chūgoku	YGJ/RJOH	442,385	6,396	1,777
40.	Shonai Airport	Shōnai	Tōhoku	SYO/RJSY	425,350	4,664	1,141
41.	Tsushima Airport	Tsushima	Kyūshū	TSJ/RJDT	369,634	5,760	747
42.	Yamagata Airport	Yamagata	Tōhoku	GAJ/RJSC	344,874	6,910	1,672
43.	Saga Airport	Saga	Kyūshū	HSG/RJFS	339,972	8,830	514
44.	Tottori Airport	Tottori	Chūgoku	TTJ/RJOR	337,933	4,294	1,674
45.	Okadama Airport	Sapporo	Hokkaidō	OKD/RJCO	319,586	17,716	370
46.	Wakkanai Airport	Wakkanai	Hokkaidō	WKJ/RJCW	294,880	4,990	968
47.	Hachijojima Airport	Hachijō-jima	Kantō	HAC/RJTH	263,941	5,102	3,014
48.	Kumejima Airport	Kumejima	Okinawa	UEO/ROKJ	260,679	4,104	2,175
49.	Nakashibetsu Airport	Nakashibetsu	Hokkaidō	SHB/RJCN	227,855	4,046	409
50.	Fukue Airport	Gotō	Kyūshū	FUJ/RJFE	192,252	3,730	747

== 2000 final statistics ==
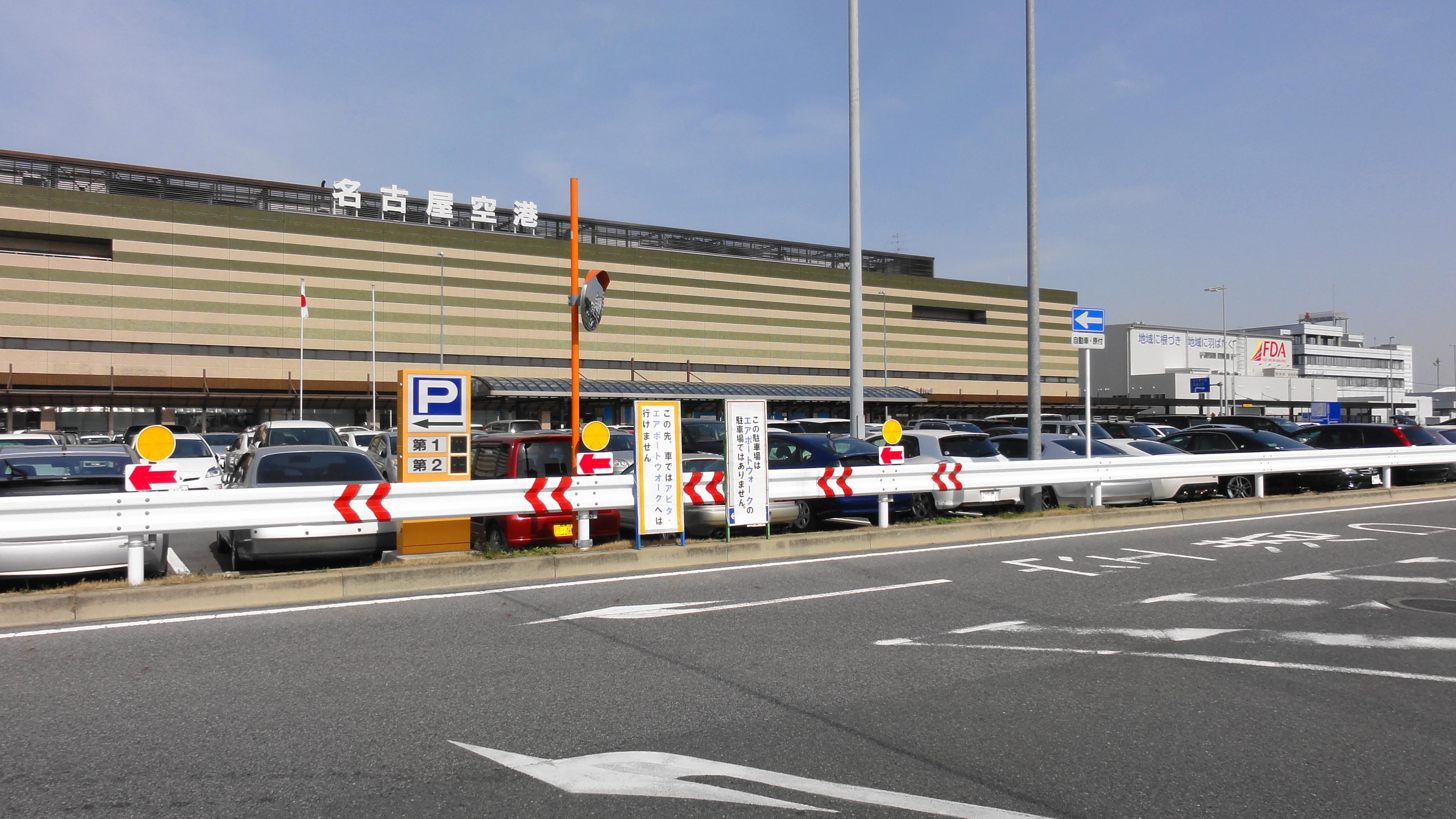
Nagoya Airfield was the main airport of Nagoya until 2005. But after Fuji Dream Airlines designed the airport as a secondary hub the passenger traffic has commenced to increase.

The 50 busiest airports in Japan in 2000 ordered by total passenger traffic, according to the MLIT reports.

Rank	Airport	City served	Region	IATA/ ICAO	Passengers	Aircraft	Cargo
1.	Haneda Airport	Tōkyō	Kantō	HND/RJTT	56,402,206	256,394	769,749
2.	Narita International Airport	Tōkyō	Kantō	NRT/RJAA	27,389,915	134,496	1,932,692
3.	Kansai International Airport	Ōsaka	Kansai	KIX/RJBB	20,491,333	123,202	999,695
4.	Fukuoka Airport	Fukuoka	Kyūshū	FUK/RJFF	19,687,895	139,950	297,606
5.	New Chitose Airport	Sapporo	Hokkaidō	CTS/RJCC	18,023,450	99,770	294,132
6.	Osaka International Airport	Ōsaka	Kansai	ITM/RJOO	16,344,400	103,084	169,391
7.	Naha Airport	Naha	Okinawa	OKA/ROAH	11,233,913	113,586	206,516
8.	Nagoya Airfield	Nagoya	Chūbu	NKM/RJNA	10,889,003	119,442	190,882
9.	Kagoshima Airport	Kagoshima	Kyūshū	KOJ/RJFK	6,113,667	68,656	47,208
10.	Miyazaki Airport	Miyazaki	Kyūshū	KMI/RJFM	3,348,025	41,010	23,884
11.	Hiroshima Airport	Hiroshima	Chūgoku	HIJ/RJOA	3,326,527	21,774	32,117
12.	Sendai Airport	Sendai	Tōhoku	SDJ/RJSS	3,291,928	43,850	31,095
13.	Nagasaki Airport	Nagasaki	Kyūshū	NGS/RJFU	2,957,437	45,352	25,386
14.	Kumamoto Airport	Kumamoto	Kyūshū	KMJ/RJFT	2,717,086	30,974	29,701
15.	Matsuyama Airport	Matsuyama	Shikoku	MYJ/RJOM	2,687,327	24,612	14,357
16.	Komatsu Airport	Komatsu	Chūbu	KMQ/RJNK	2,587,710	15,670	29,364
17.	Hakodate Airport	Hakodate	Hokkaidō	HKD/RJCH	2,262,033	24,908	22,016
18.	Oita Airport	Ōita	Kyūshū	OIT/RJFO	2,059,481	16,310	17,706
19.	Kōchi Airport	Kōchi, Kōchi	Shikoku	KCZ/RJOK	1,931,804	27,080	7,892
20.	Aomori Airport	Aomori	Tōhoku	AOJ/RJSA	1,616,471	13,892	7,309
21.	Takamatsu Airport	Takamatsu	Shikoku	TAK/RJOT	1,609,704	19,218	12,600
22.	Ishigaki Airport	Ishigaki	Okinawa	ISG/ROIG	1,422,735	19,474	13,695
23.	Niigata Airport	Niigata	Chūbu	KIJ/RJSN	1,268,123	26,306	6,512
24.	Akita Airport	Akita	Tōhoku	AXT/RJSK	1,230,046	12,374	8,795
25.	Toyama Airport	Toyama	Chūbu	TOY/RJNT	1,162,172	11,400	3,677
26.	Memanbetsu Airport	Ōzora	Hokkaidō	MMB/RJCM	1,059,770	11,068	7,184
27.	Miyako Airport	Miyako-jima	Okinawa	MMY/ROMY	1,002,062	15,304	11,625
28.	Tokushima Airport	Tokushima	Shikoku	TKS/RJOS	997,969	12,638	4,400
29.	Asahikawa Airport	Asahikawa	Hokkaidō	AKJ/RJEC	973,239	9,774	15,137
30.	Okayama Airport	Okayama	Chūgoku	OKJ/RJOB	923,925	9,202	8,092
31.	Kushiro Airport	Kushiro	Hokkaidō	KUH/RJCK	901,468	12,186	8,927
32.	Izumo Airport	Izumo	Chūgoku	IZO/RJOC	774,783	13,398	2,370
33.	Fukushima Airport	Fukushima	Tōhoku	FKS/RJSF	709,282	9,194	3,033
34.	Yamaguchi Ube Airport	Yamaguchi/Ube	Chūgoku	UBJ/RJDC	700,054	5,796	3,463
35.	Obihiro Airport	Obihiro	Hokkaidō	OBO/RJCB	678,105	10,486	10,119
36.	Amami Airport	Amami	Kyūshū	ASJ/RJKA	617,325	13,110	2,934
37.	Misawa Airport	Misawa	Tōhoku	MSJ/RJSM	588,019	4,334	2,804
38.	Hanamaki Airport	Hanamaki	Tōhoku	HNA/RJSI	528,066	8,880	2,513
39.	Shonai Airport	Shōnai	Tōhoku	SYO/RJSY	428,201	4,948	1,309
40.	Miho-Yonago Airport	Yonago	Chūgoku	YGJ/RJOH	414,219	6,406	1,853
41.	Yamagata Airport	Yamagata	Tōhoku	GAJ/RJSC	379,356	6,818	2,011
42.	Tsushima Airport	Tsushima	Kyūshū	TSJ/RJDT	375,103	5,644	692
43.	Tottori Airport	Tottori	Chūgoku	TTJ/RJOR	357,738	5,592	1,671
44.	Okadama Airport	Sapporo	Hokkaidō	OKD/RJCO	336,076	17,970	425
45.	Saga Airport	Saga	Kyūshū	HSG/RJFS	326,419	9,710	728
46.	Wakkanai Airport	Wakkanai	Hokkaidō	WKJ/RJCW	299,266	4,942	1,074
47.	Kumejima Airport	Kumejima	Okinawa	UEO/ROKJ	272,725	4,058	2,238
48.	Hachijojima Airport	Hachijō-jima	Kantō	HAC/RJTH	248,093	5,296	3,155
49.	Nakashibetsu Airport	Nakashibetsu	Hokkaidō	SHB/RJCN	214,192	3,878	413
50.	Fukue Airport	Gotō	Kyūshū	FUJ/RJFE	191,412	3,568	678
