= Air Hokkaido =

Regional airline of Japan (1994–2006)

Air Hokkaido Co., Ltd. エアー北海道株式会社 Eā Hokkaidō Kabushiki-gaisha
IATA	ICAO	Call sign
—	ADK	AIR DREAM
- Founded: April 5, 1994
- Commenced operations: July 22, 1994
- Ceased operations: March 31, 2006
- Hubs: Hakodate Airport
- Alliance: Star Alliance (affiliate; 1999–2006)
- Fleet size: 2
- Destinations: Hakodate, Okushiri, Sapporo-Okadama
- Parent company: All Nippon Airways
- Headquarters: Hakodate, Hokkaidō, Japan
- Website: Air Hokkaido

Air Hokkaido was an airline based in Hakodate, Hokkaidō, Japan. It operated domestic feeder flights in Hokkaidō from its main base at Hakodate Airport. The airline was dissolved by parent company All Nippon Airways in July 2006.

== History ==
The airline was established on 5 April 1994 and started operations on 22 July 1994. The airline ceased operations on 31 March 2006 as their sole aircraft was no longer airworthy. Its sole route, Hakodate-Okushiri, was taken over the next day by Hokkaido Air System, which is owned by competitor Japan Airlines and Air Nippon Network also increased the Hakodate-Sapporo route in the following day. Parent company All Nippon Airways dissolved Air Hokkaido in July 2006.

== Fleet ==
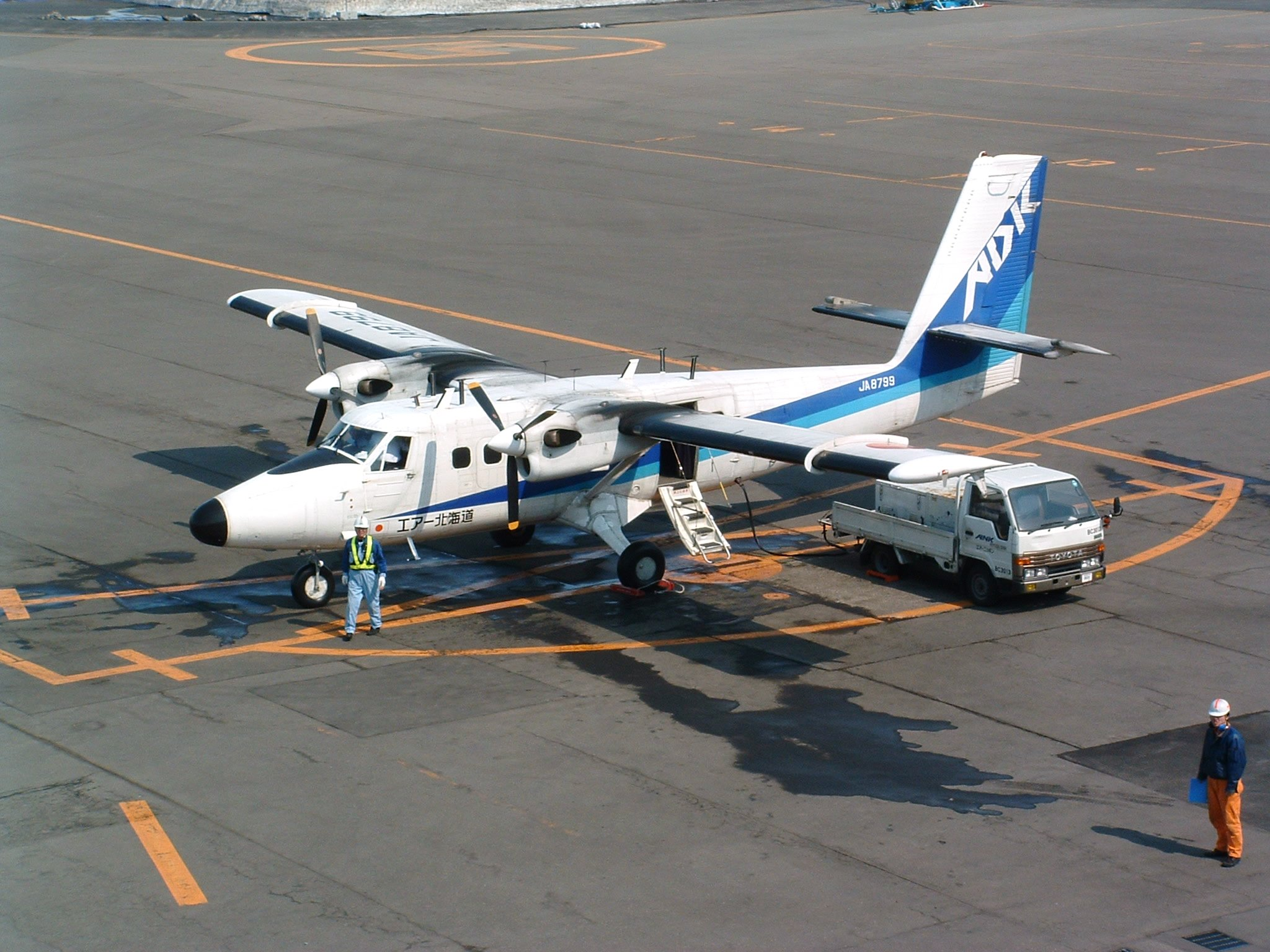
An Air Hokkaido DeHavilland DHC-6 Twin Otter at Okadama Airport, Sapporo, Japan. (2003)

The Air Hokkaido fleet consisted of 2 DHC-6 Twin Otter Series 300 aircraft (at January 2005).

== See also ==
- Air Do (Hokkaido International Airlines), an unrelated company
