= Chubu Centrair International Airport =

Primary airport serving Nagoya, Japan

Chubu Centrair International Airport 中部国際空港

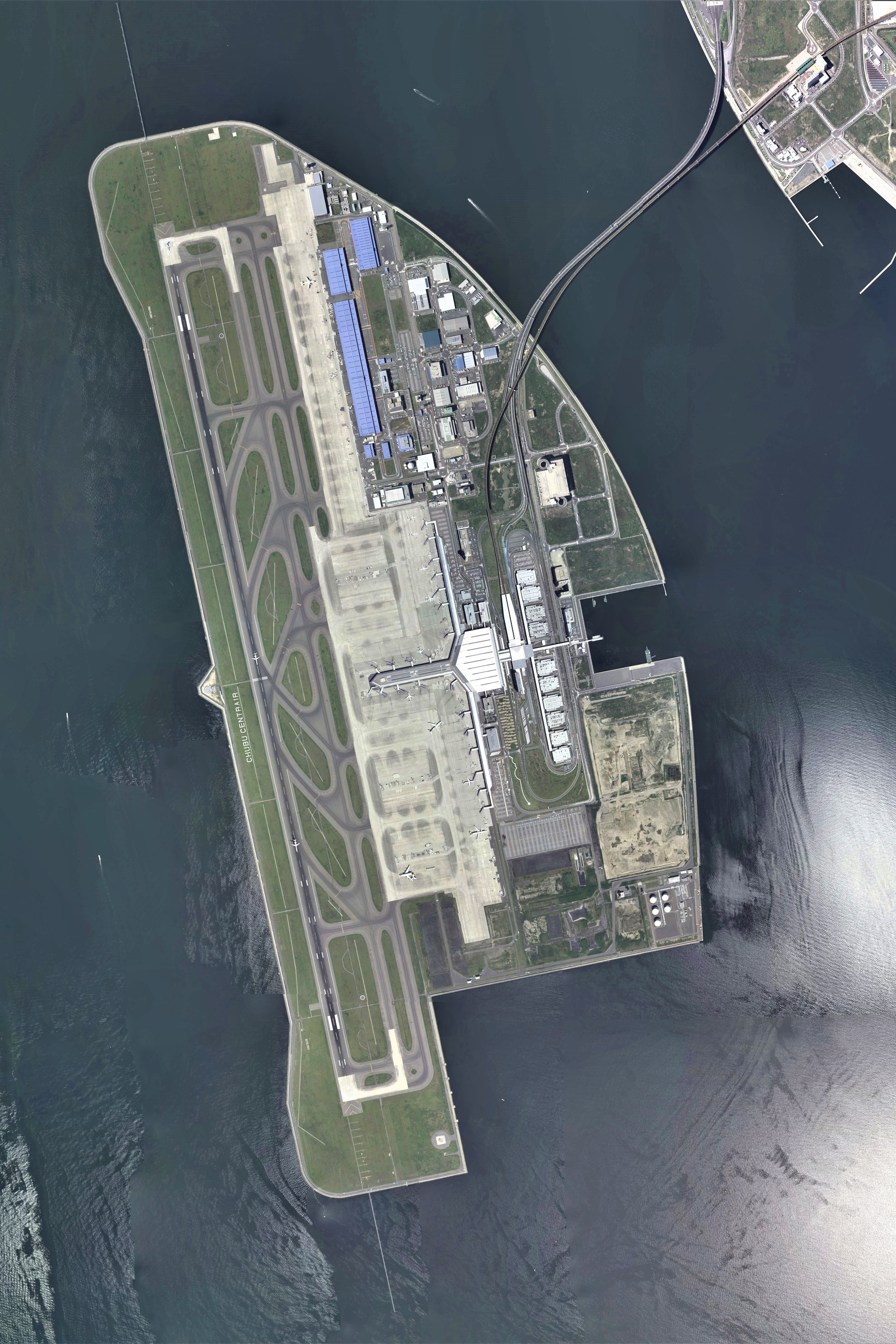
- Satellite image from 2010
- IATA: NGO; ICAO: RJGG

Summary
- Airport type: Public
- Owner/Operator: Central Japan International Airport Co., Ltd. (CJIAC)
- Serves: Chūkyō metropolitan area
- Location: Tokoname, Aichi Prefecture, Japan
- Opened: 17 February 2005; 21 years ago
- Focus city for: All Nippon Airways; Japan Airlines; Polar Air Cargo
- Operating base for: Jetstar Japan
- Elevation AMSL: 12 ft (3.7 m)
- Coordinates: 34°51′30″N 136°48′19″E
- Website: www.centrair.jp

Map
- Location in Aichi Prefecture Location in Japan Location in Asia

Runways
Direction	Length		Surface
Direction	m	ft	Surface
18/36	3,500	11,483	Asphalt

Statistics (2024 Fiscal year (2024/04-2025/03))
- Passengers: 11,038,828 (Note: In calendar year 2024, the number is 10,610,637)
- Cargo (metric tonnes): 139,408
- Aircraft movements: 95,212
- Source: Chubu Centrair International Airport

Chubu Centrair International Airport (中部国際空港, Chūbu Kokusai Kūkō) (IATA: NGO, ICAO: RJGG) is an international airport on an artificial island in Ise Bay, 35 km (22 mi) south of Nagoya in central Japan (Chūbu). The airport covers about 470 hectares (1,161 acres) of land and has one 3,500 m (11,500 ft) runway.

The name "Centrair" (セントレア, Sentorea) is an abbreviation of "Central Japan International Airport", an alternate translation used in the English name of the airport's operating company, Central Japan International Airport Co., Ltd. (中部国際空港株式会社, Chūbu Kokusai Kūkō Kabushiki-gaisha).

== History ==
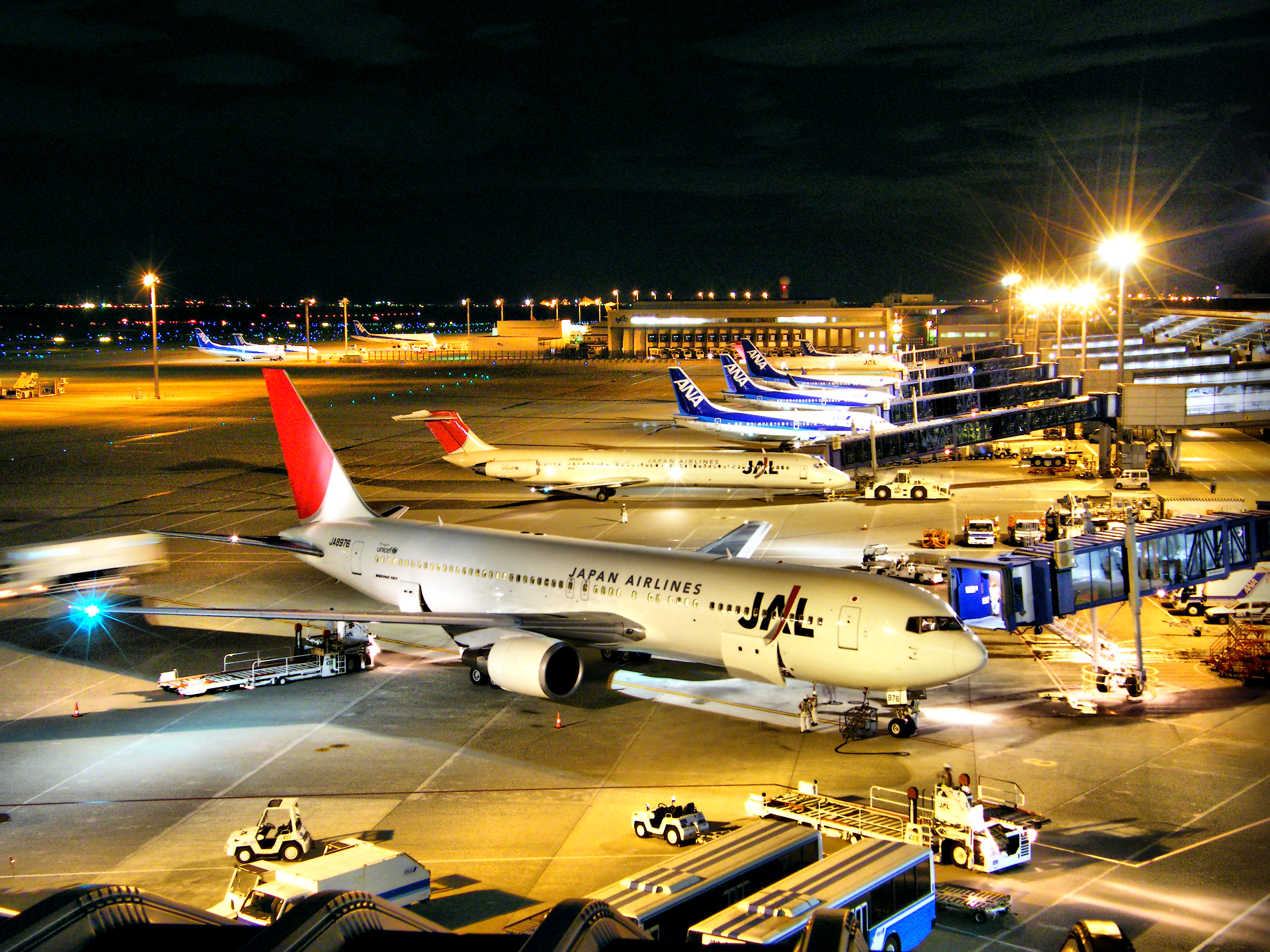
JAL and ANA operations at Chubu International Airport

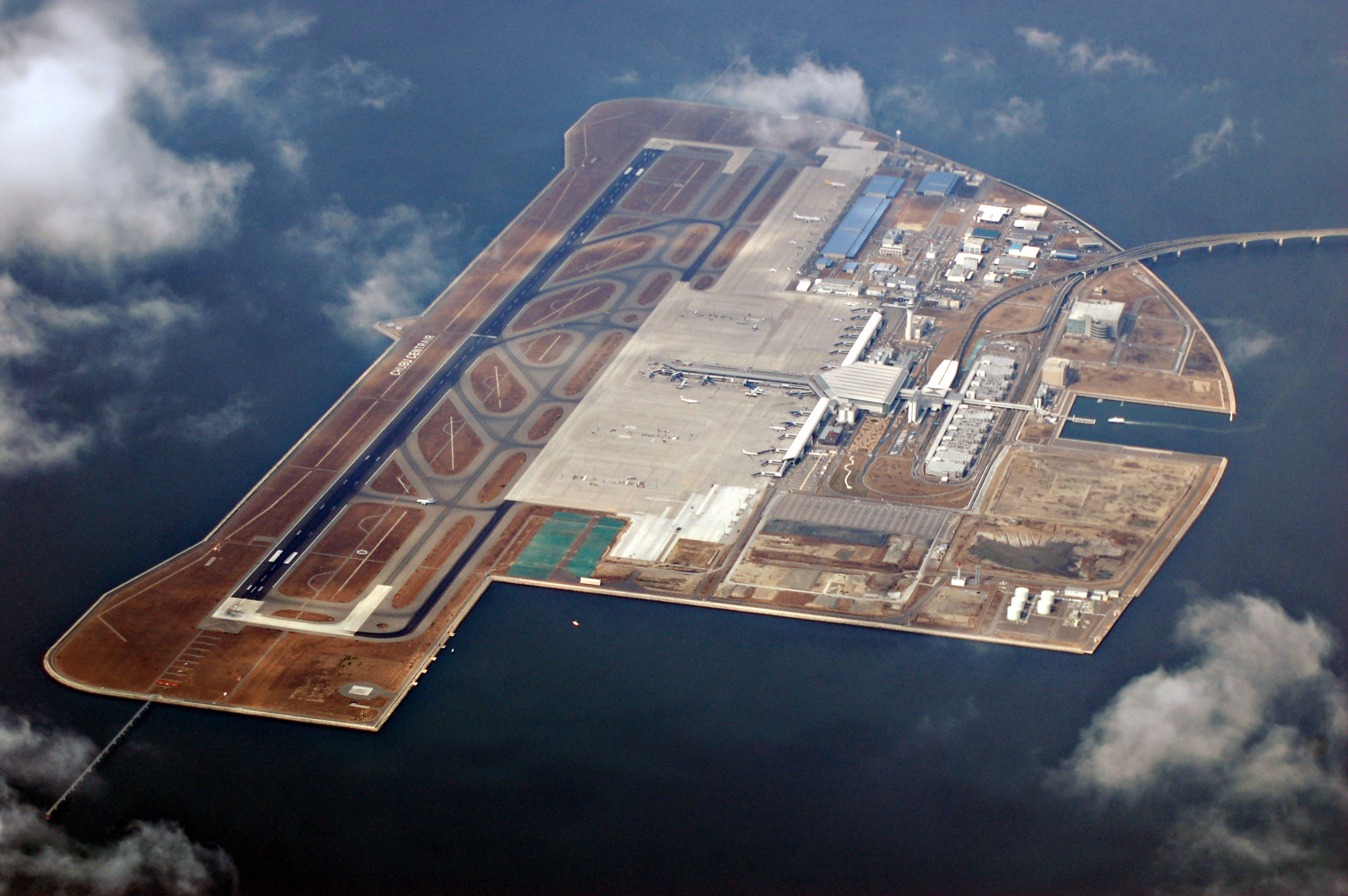
Aerial photo taken in 2008

Centrair serves the third largest metropolitan area in Japan, centered around the city of Nagoya. The region is a major manufacturing centre, hosting the headquarters and production facilities of Toyota and production facilities for Mitsubishi Motors and Mitsubishi Aircraft Corporation.

With much lobbying by local business groups such as Toyota, especially for 24-hour cargo flights, construction started August 2000, with a budget of ¥768 billion (around $7.3 billion), but through efficient management nearly ¥100 billion was saved. Penta-Ocean Construction was a major contractor. The artificial island on which the airport is located also houses the Aichi International Exhibition Center.

According to Japanese media sources, the yakuza group Kodo-kai earned an immense amount of money by being the sole supplier of dirt, rock, sand, and gravel for the airport's construction via a front company called Samix. Although several Samix executives were criminally indicted for racketeering, the charges were later dropped. According to the sources, Kodo-kai had informants working within Nagoya's police force who fed the organization inside information which allowed them to stay a step ahead of investigating authorities.

When Centrair opened on 17 February 2005, it took over almost all of the existing Nagoya Airport's commercial flights, and relieved the Tokyo and Kansai areas of cargo shipments. As a replacement for Nagoya Airport, it also inherited its IATA airport code NGO. The airport opened in time to service the influx of visitors for Expo 2005.

=== Route withdrawals ===
There were several withdrawals from Centrair after the airport commenced operations. American Airlines operated a route to Chicago for less than seven months in 2005, stating that the service was "not as profitable as we had hoped". In 2008, after a few years of service from Centrair, several airlines cancelled certain flights and put others on hiatus, including Malaysia Airlines' suspension of flights to Kuala Lumpur, Jetstar ending its airport operation, Continental Airlines stopping its Honolulu flight and United Airlines' suspension of flights to San Francisco, citing low premium cabin demand. This flight also continued to Chicago until 2007. Emirates and HK Express left the airport in 2009, though the latter returned in 2014. Japan Airlines also ended its flights to Paris in 2009 and Bangkok in 2020. Garuda Indonesia ended service from Denpasar in 2012, returned with the opening of direct flights from Jakarta in 2019, then suspended services once again in 2020. EVA Air left the airport in 2012. TransAsia Airways subsidiary V Air withdrew from Centrair and ended operations in 2016.

Northwest Airlines operated routes from Nagoya to Detroit, Guam, Manila, Saipan, and Tokyo-Narita prior to its 2009 merger with Delta Air Lines. Delta took over this operation and added a Honolulu route in 2010, growing to nine daily flights at Nagoya, but cancelled most of these services over the next decade. Delta's last two routes at Nagoya, Detroit and Honolulu, were suspended due to the COVID-19 pandemic in 2020. The Detroit route resumed on a weekly basis in 2021, but Delta announced its permanent cancellation in 2023. Finnair and Lufthansa suspended their flights from Helsinki and Frankfurt, respectively, to Nagoya during the COVID-19 pandemic; Finnair resumed the route in 2024 on a summer seasonal basis, becoming the only European airline to continue operating flights to Nagoya.

=== Aichi Sky Expo ===
An exposition center on the airport's island was opened on 30 August 2019. The exposition center has six exhibition halls each being 10,000 m^{2} (110,000 sq ft). Events held at the venue include the 2019 edition of the Wired Music Festival on 7 and 8 September.

== The Second Runway ==
Aichi Governor Hideaki Omura announced in December 2021 that two new runways were planned at the airport: a 3,290 m (10,790 ft) parallel runway to the east of the existing runway, to be completed in 2027, and after the landfill expansion work on the west side of the airport, a 3,500 m (11,500 ft) runway there, which would replace the existing runway.

Ministry of Land, Infrastructure, Transport and Tourism of Japan has begun preparations for construction of Chubu Centrair Airport's second runway in 2024. The new 3,290 m (10,790 ft) runway will be built 210 m (690 ft) east of the current runway. Construction is scheduled to begin in 2025 and be completed in 2027.

== Terminals and other major buildings ==
A simple map of the airport

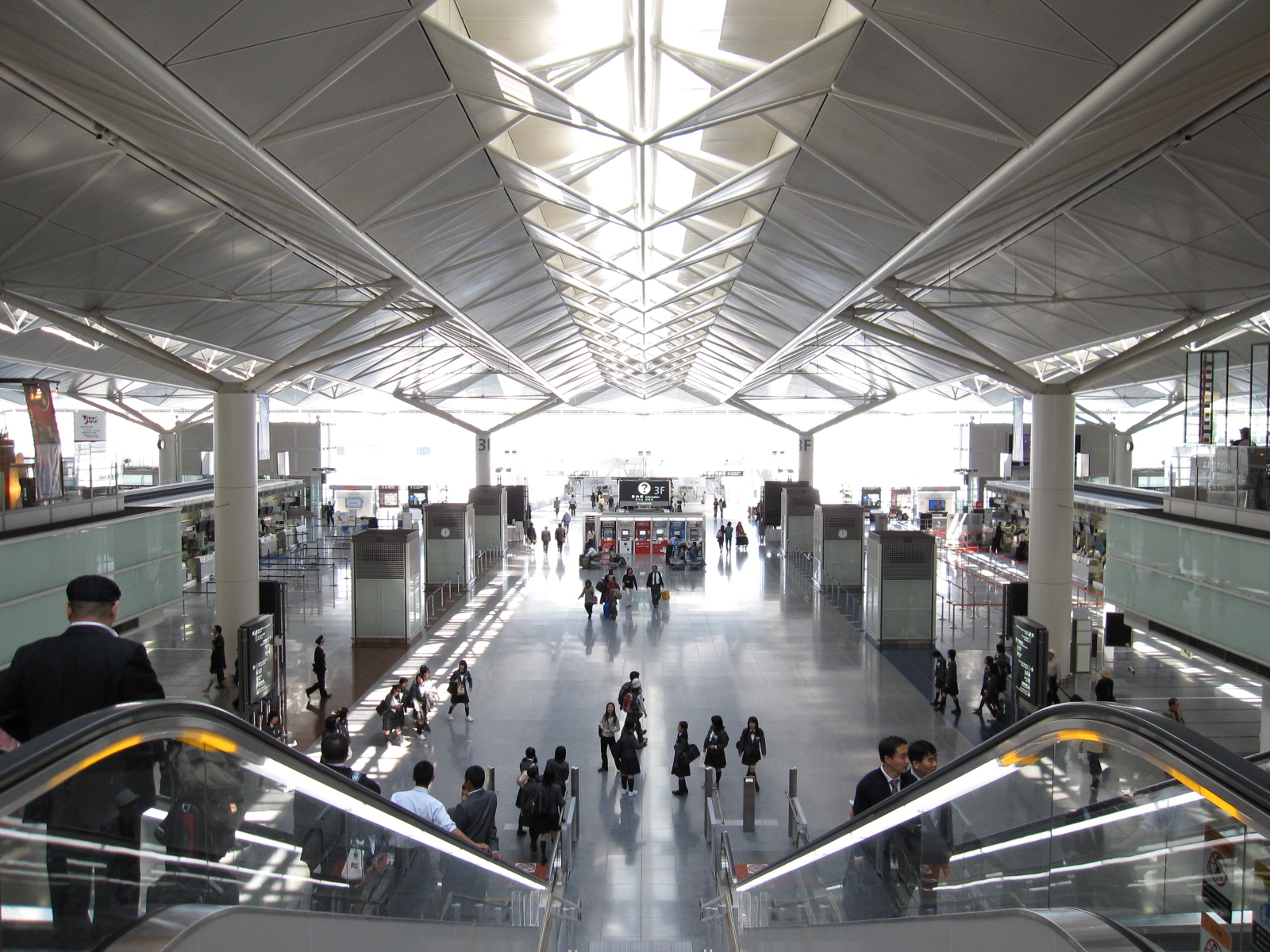
Main hall of arrival, at the conjuncture of the T-shaped building

=== Terminal 1 ===
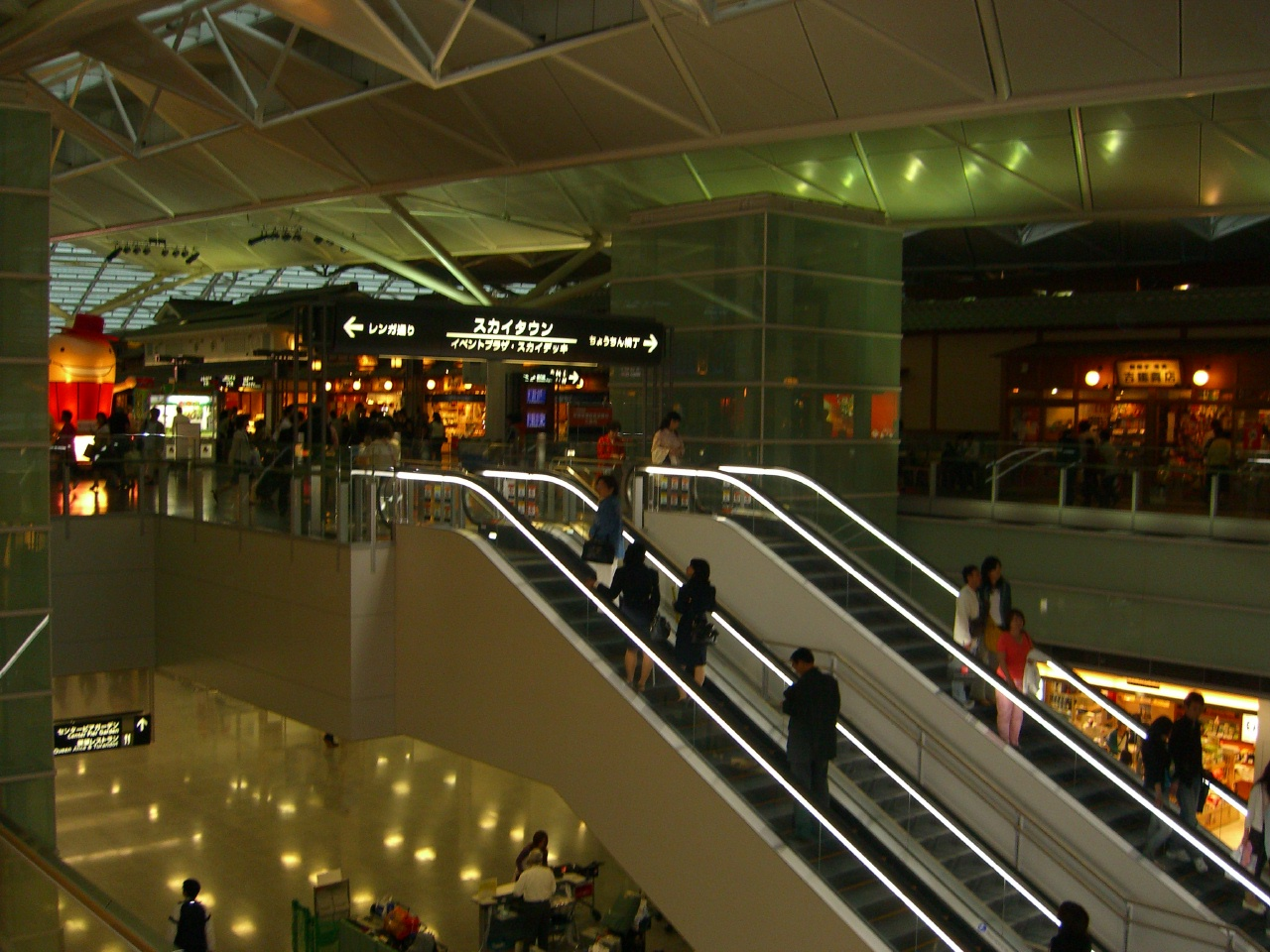
Entrance to Centrair's 4th Floor Sky Town

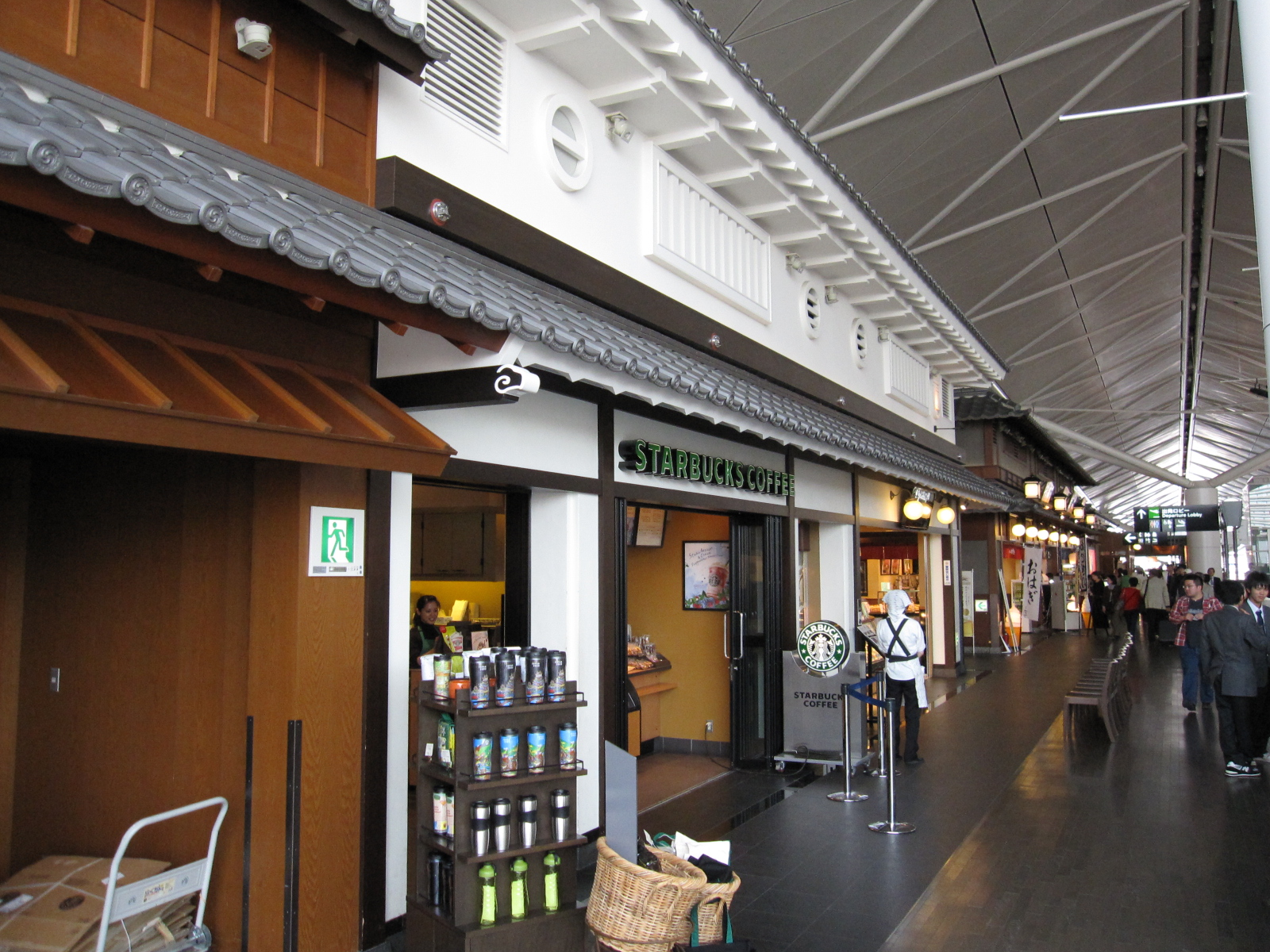
Shops in traditional Japanese style

Terminal 1 is the main terminal of the airport. The northern side of the terminal holds domestic flights, while the southern side holds international flights, each with dedicated ticket counters, security checkpoints and baggage carousels, and for international flights, immigration and customs facilities. Arrivals are processed on the second floor, and departures on the third. The lower level is used for maintenance, catering, and other ground operations, as well as for passenger buses to hardstands in the middle of the airport ramp. There are thirteen gates for domestic flights (including three bus gates), and fourteen for international flights (including three bus gates).

Sky Town Shopping Center is on the fourth floor, accessible to the general public, with 61 shops and restaurants, organized into two "streets", Renga-dori and Chochin-yokocho. The Chochin-yokocho shops are individually themed to have an authentic Japanese look.

=== Terminal 2 ===
Terminal 2 caters to both domestic and international flights for budget airlines, with 11 gates for international flights and nine gates for domestic flights. There is a shuttle bus connecting Terminals 1 and 2.

The terminal opened on 20 September 2019.

=== Flight of Dreams ===
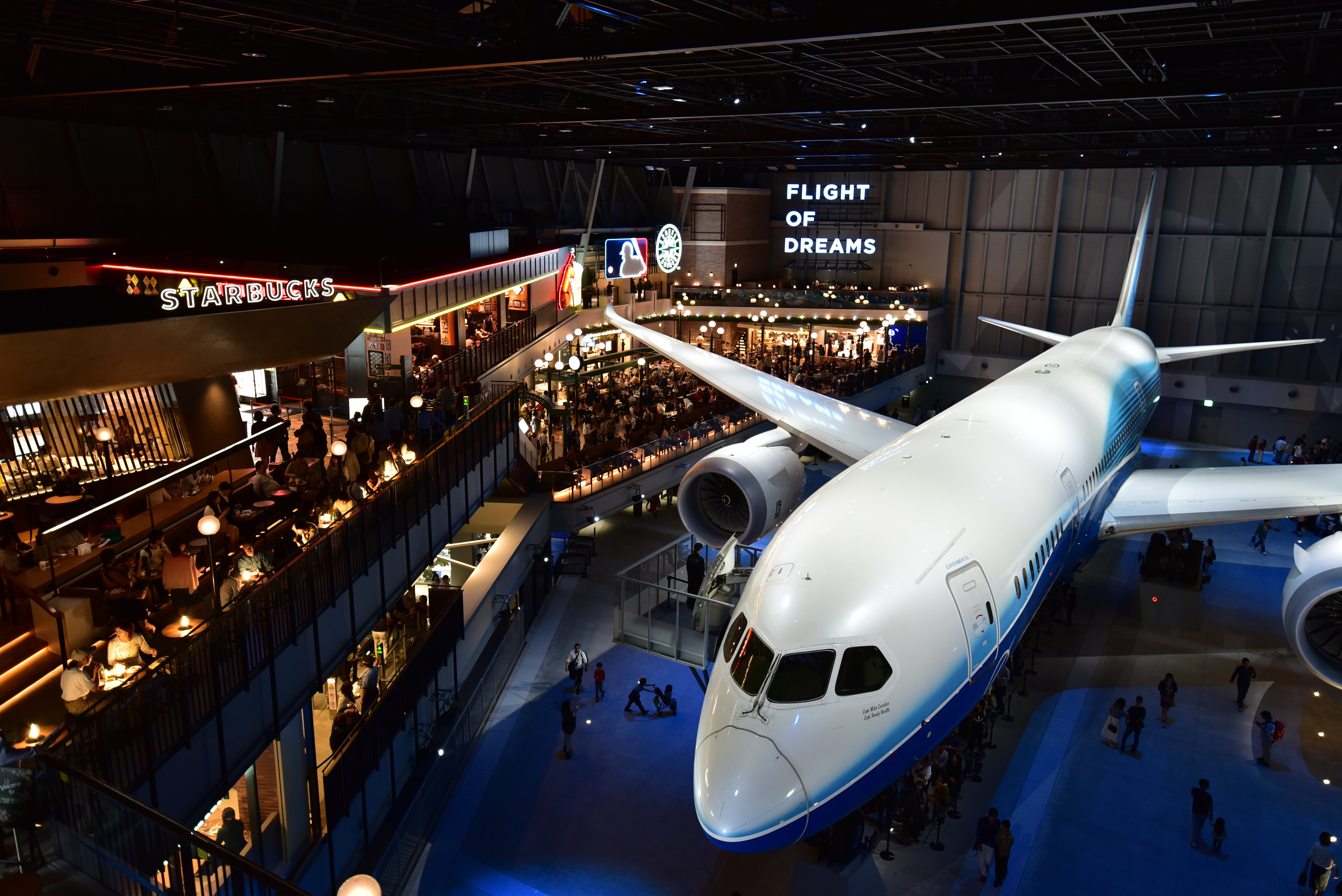
A Boeing 787 Dreamliner at the Flight of Dreams section of the airport

A Seattle-themed retail complex called "Flight of Dreams" opened in 2018, with the first-ever prototype Boeing 787 Dreamliner as a display centerpiece. Boeing started in Seattle and many of its planes are still built in the area. Some components of the Boeing 787 are manufactured in Japan and are flown out of the airport to Everett, Washington, or North Charleston, South Carolina, for final assembly.

=== Boeing facilities ===
The Boeing Dreamlifter Operations Center is located on the airport's apron, to the south of the main terminal. This facility is used to store Japanese components of the Boeing 787 aircraft, including wings, while awaiting airlift to the assembly facility in the US. Dreamlifter aircraft have operated from Centrair since 2007 and make several trips a week to Boeing's 787 assembly plants at Paine Field in Washington and Charleston International Airport in South Carolina.

=== Access Plaza ===
An access plaza contains the Central Japan International Airport Station and other transportation services, such as cars, buses, and high-speed crafts. It is located in front of and connected to Terminal 1, and provides access through the P1 parking lot passage to the Flight of Dreams and Terminal 2.

== Airlines and destinations ==
Airlines	Destinations
Aero K	Cheongju
Air Do	Hakodate, Sapporo–Chitose
All Nippon Airways	Naha, Sapporo–Chitose
ANA Wings	Fukuoka, Ishigaki, Kagoshima, Miyako, Nagasaki, Naha, Sapporo–Chitose, Sendai, Tokyo–Haneda, Tokyo–Narita; Seasonal: Asahikawa, Hakodate, Memanbetsu
Asiana Airlines	Seoul–Incheon
Cathay Pacific	Hong Kong, Taipei–Taoyuan
Cebu Pacific	Cebu (resumes 1 December 2026), Manila
China Airlines	Taipei–Taoyuan
China Eastern Airlines	Shanghai–Pudong
Finnair	Seasonal: Helsinki
Fuji Dream Airlines	Izumo, Kōchi, Kumamoto
HK Express	Hong Kong
Ibex Airlines	Fukuoka, Matsuyama, Oita, Sendai
Japan Airlines	Honolulu, Kushiro, Obihiro, Sapporo–Chitose, Taipei–Taoyuan, Tianjin, Tokyo–Haneda, Tokyo–Narita
Japan Transocean Air	Naha
Jeju Air	Seoul–Incheon
Jetstar Japan	Fukuoka, Naha
Jin Air	Busan, Seoul–Incheon
Juneyao Airlines	Shanghai–Pudong
Korean Air	Busan, Seoul–Incheon
Lufthansa	Seasonal: Frankfurt (resumes 29 March 2027)
Oriental Air Bridge	Akita, Fukuoka, Miyazaki
Peach	Naha, Sapporo–Chitose, Sendai, Seoul–Gimpo, Taipei–Taoyuan
Philippine Airlines	Manila
Qingdao Airlines	Qingdao
Singapore Airlines	Singapore
Skymark Airlines	Kagoshima, Naha, Sapporo–Chitose
Solaseed Air	Kagoshima, Miyazaki, Naha
Spring Airlines	Shanghai–Pudong
StarFlyer	Fukuoka
Starlux Airlines	Taichung, Taipei–Taoyuan
Thai AirAsia X	Bangkok–Don Mueang
Thai Airways International	Bangkok–Suvarnabhumi
Thai Lion Air	Bangkok–Don Mueang, Taipei–Taoyuan
Tigerair Taiwan	Kaohsiung, Taichung, Taipei–Taoyuan
Toki Air	Niigata, Sapporo–Okadama
United Airlines	Guam
VietJet Air	Hanoi, Ho Chi Minh City
Vietnam Airlines	Hanoi, Ho Chi Minh City

== Ground transportation ==
=== Train ===
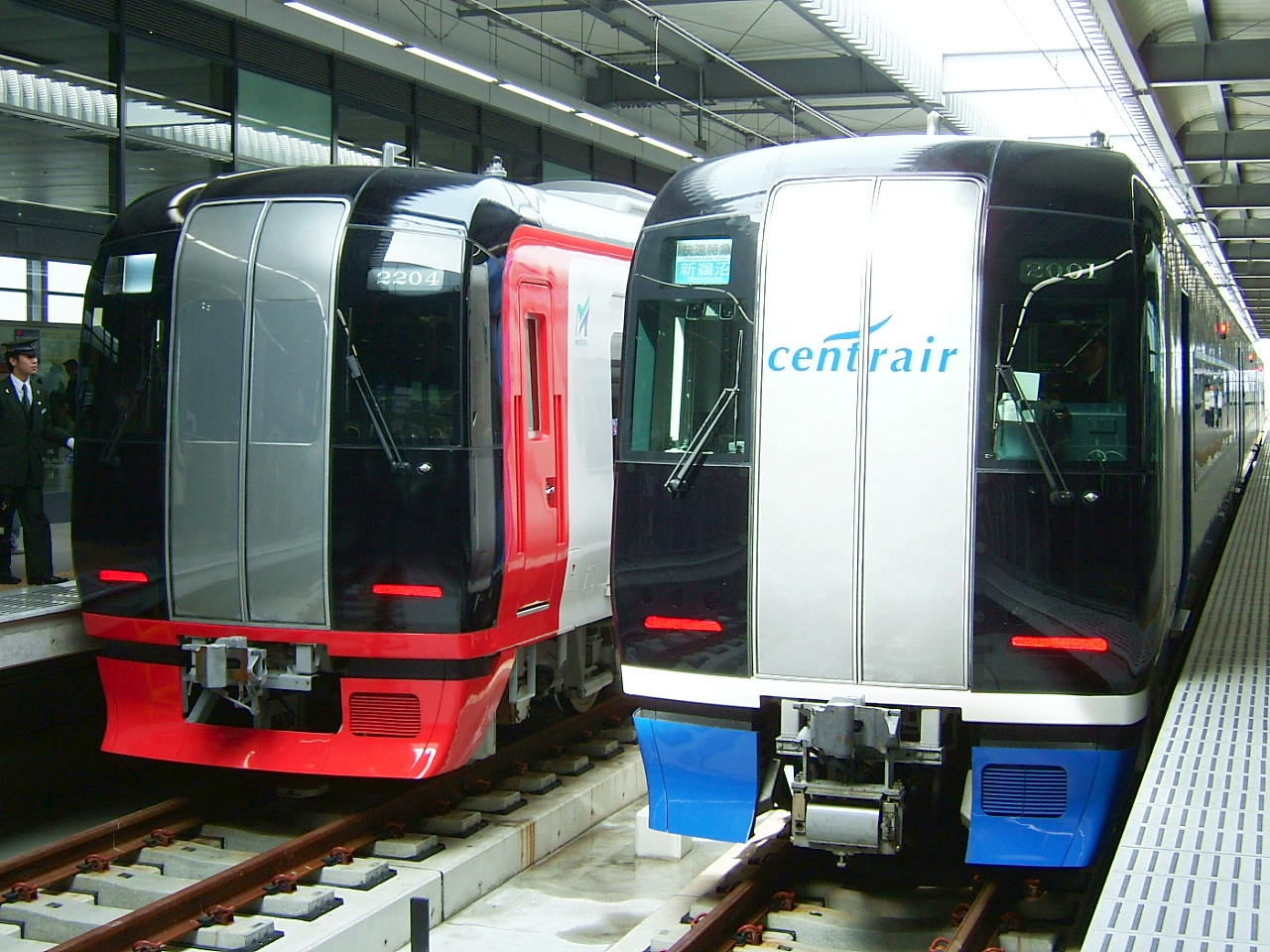
Meitetsu's μSky Limited Express (right) and Limited Express (left)

Central Japan International Airport Station, the train station for Centrair is located on the Meitetsu Airport Line operated by Nagoya Railroad (Meitetsu). The fastest "μSky Limited Express" service connects the airport to Meitetsu Nagoya Station in 28 minutes. All μSky Limited Express are operating at a max speed of 120 km/h (75 mph) by 2000 series trains, which have all seats designated and it is required to purchase an extra 360 yen "special limited express ticket". Meitetsu Nagoya Station is adjacent to JR Nagoya Station, allowing transfers to Shinkansen bullet trains bound for not only Tokyo and Osaka but also many major cities, as well as JR, Meitetsu, and Kintetsu local trains, and the Nagoya Municipal Subway.

There is also a proposal for Aonami line linking Centrair to Nagoya Station by constructing a tunnel or bridge. Nagoya municipal government acted the assessment of feasibility in 2019.

=== Bus ===
Centrair Limousine provides direct bus service to and from central Nagoya, Sakae, and major hotels. It is operated by a private bus company in Mie Prefecture. High-speed buses to the neighboring prefectures for 3,000 yen to Kyoto via Mie Prefecture have been operating.

=== Ferry ===
A ferry connects to the passenger terminal in Tsu – a 40-minute trip.

=== Car ===
A toll road, the Chitaōdan Road, links Centrair and the mainland.

=== Bicycle ===
Bicycles are not allowed on the Centrair Bridge toll road to the mainland. Cyclists departing the airport must either take a Meitetsu local train one stop to Rinkū Tokoname Station or a taxi across the bridge to the Rinkū Interchange north of Aeon Mall Tokoname.
