= Hokkaido Air System =

Regional airline of Japan

Hokkaido Air System Co., Ltd. 株式会社北海道エアシステム Kabushiki-gaisha Hokkaidō Ea Shisutemu
| IATA | ICAO | Call sign |
|---|---|---|
| JL | NTH | NORTH AIR |
- Founded: September 30, 1997; 28 years ago
- Commenced operations: March 28, 1998; 28 years ago
- Hubs: Okadama Airport
- Frequent-flyer program: JAL Mileage Bank
- Alliance: Oneworld (affiliate)
- Fleet size: 4
- Destinations: 6
- Parent company: Japan Airlines (57.3%)
- Headquarters: Higashi-ku, Sapporo, Hokkaido, Japan
- Key people: Eiji Takemura (president & CEO)
- Employees: 93 (1 March 2024)
- Website: www.info.hac-air.co.jp

Hokkaido Air System (HAC) is a Japanese regional airline that operates scheduled services in Hokkaidō and Aomori Prefecture, Japan from a main base of operations at Okadama Airport in Higashi-ku, Sapporo. As of June 30, 2023, the airline is owned by Japan Airlines (57.3%), Hokkaido Prefecture (19.5%), Sapporo City (13.5%) and 16 other shareholders (9.7%).

== History ==
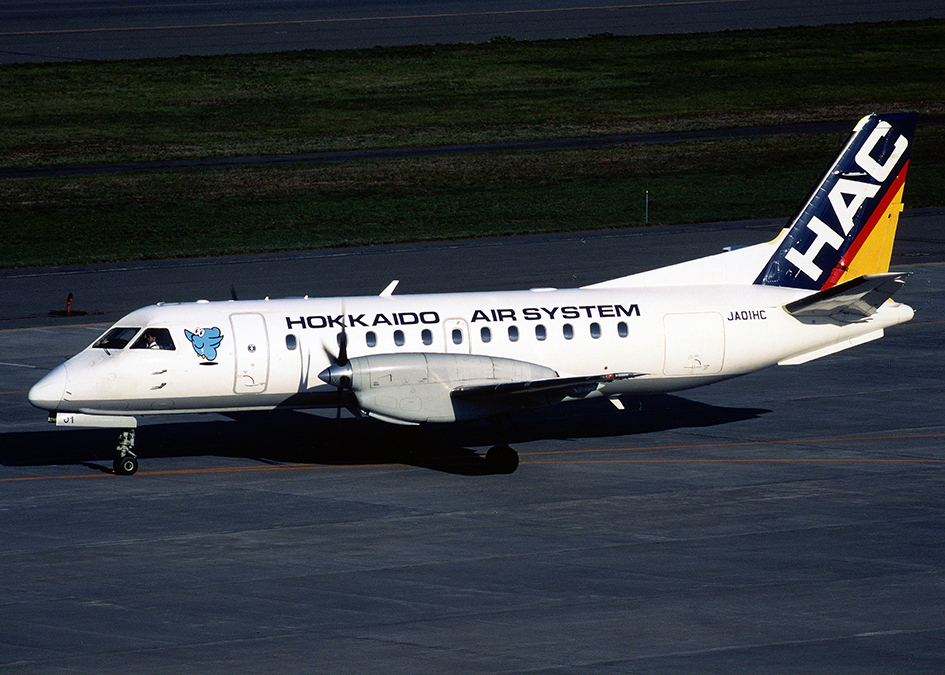
A former Hokkaido Air System Saab 340 in adapted Japan Air System livery

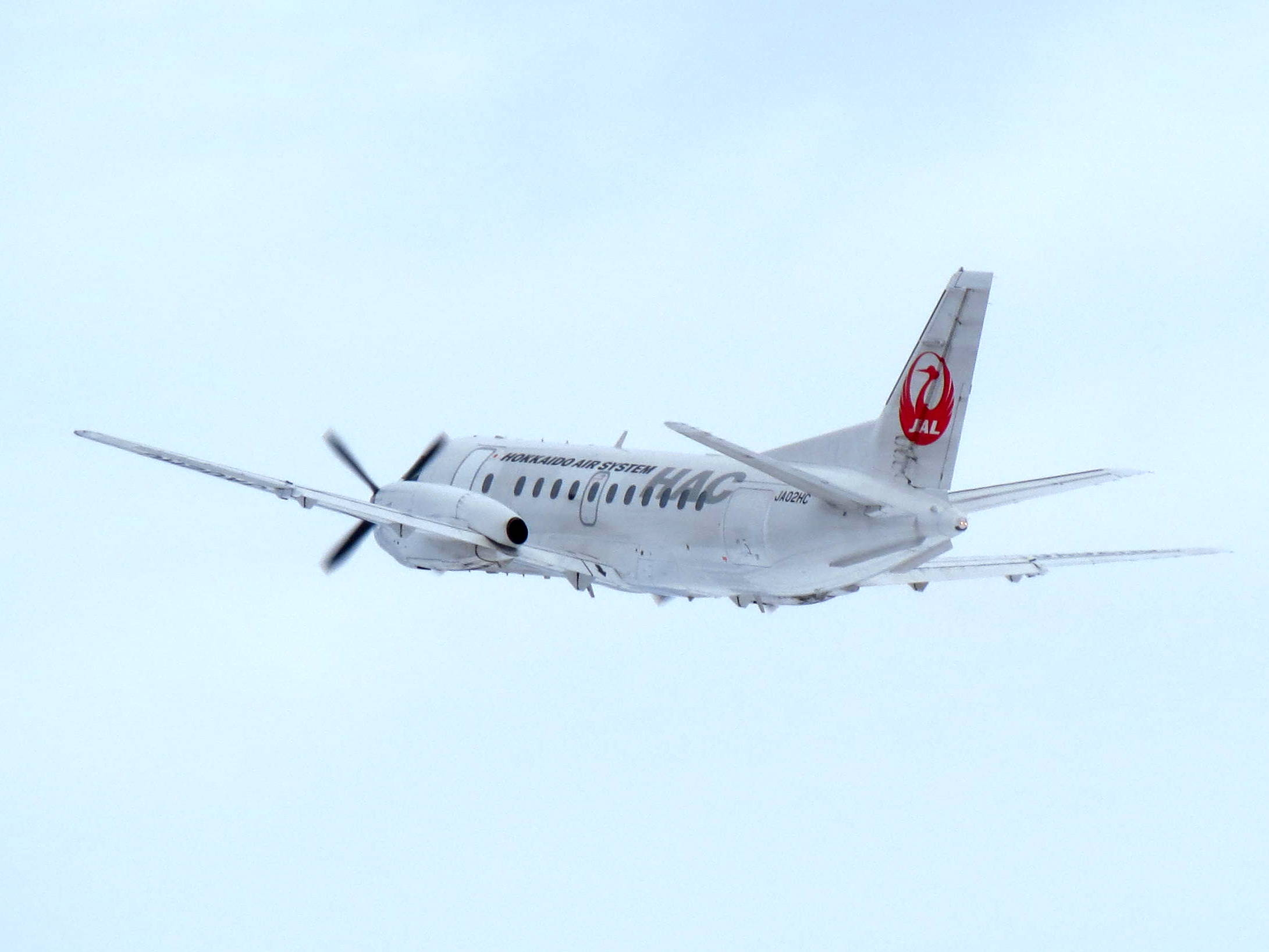
A former Hokkaido Air System Saab 340 in adapted livery of Japan Airlines

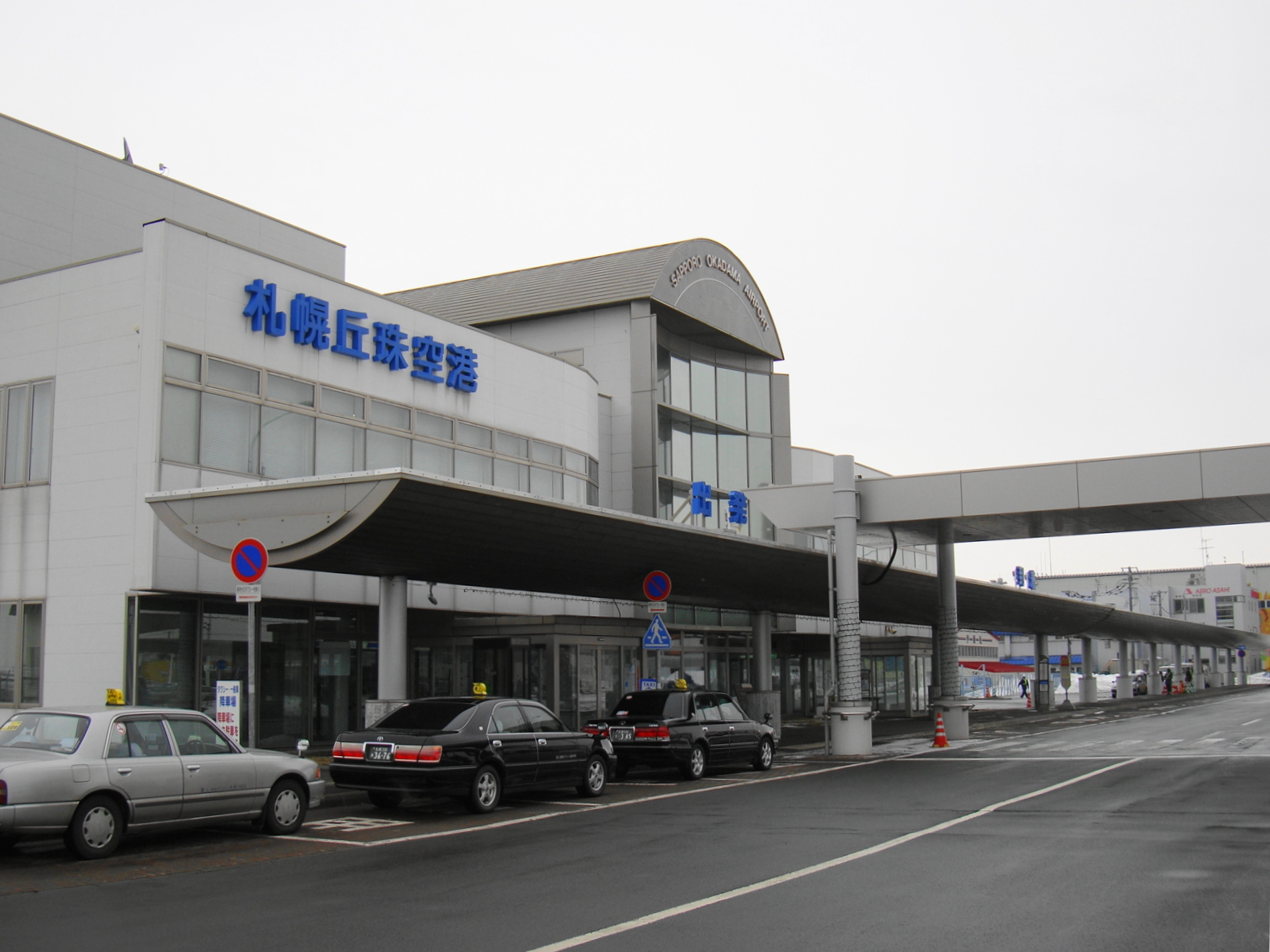
The terminal building of Okadama Airport, the location of the former HAC headquarters

The airline was established in 1997, and started operations in 1998. Founded as a joint venture with the Hokkaido government and regional municipalities and businesses, it was an affiliate of Japan Air System until that airline consolidated into Japan Airlines. Its headquarters were at one time located in the Terminal Building of New Chitose Airport in Chitose, Hokkaidō, Japan.

HAC's initial routes in 1998 were Chitose-Hakodate, Hakodate-Asahikawa, Hakodate-Kushiro and Asahikawa-Kushiro, followed by Chitose-Kushiro and Hakodate-Memanbetsu in 1999 and Hakodate-Sendai in 2001. It began Okadama service in 2003 with service to Hakodate and Kushiro, for a total of nine routes. HAC also served Monbetsu from Chitose and Okadama in 2005–06. Air Hokkaido ceased operations on 31 March 2006 and its sole route, Hakodate-Okushiri, was taken over the next day by Hokkaido Air System.

HAC left the Japan Airlines group at the end of fiscal year 2010 (March 2011) as part of the corporate restructuring of JAL, which retained a 14% stake in the airline, making it the second-largest shareholder after the Hokkaido prefectural government. Japan Airlines ceased ticket handling and reservation services for HAC flights effective September 1, 2011. The Hokkaido prefectural government and various local governments continued to subsidize HAC services to various smaller cities in the prefecture.

HAC recorded losses of 296 million yen and had negative equity of 116 million yen in the fiscal year ending March 2013, and took several measures to improve its performance, including resuming codesharing with JAL and starting service from Sapporo to Misawa in July 2013. It was revealed in August 2013 that Liberal Democratic Party lawmakers in the Hokkaido government had been pushing JAL to once again take over HAC. As of December, JAL and the Hokkaido government were reportedly in negotiations to make HAC a subsidiary of JAL, as part of which JAL and Hokkaido government would each pay off half of HAC's excess debt, with the Hokkaido government possibly doing so by cancelling part of its 360 million yen loan claim against the airline. The transaction was announced in October 2014. In October 2016, HAC consolidated its flight numbers and reservations system with the JAL group.

== Destinations ==
Hokkaido Air System operates services to the following destinations:

| City | Airport | Notes | Refs |
|---|---|---|---|
| Sapporo | Okadama Airport | Hub | |
| Rishirifuji | Rishiri Airport | | |
| Memanbetsu | Memanbetsu Airport | | |
| Kushiro | Kushiro Airport | | |
| Hakodate | Hakodate Airport | | |
| Okushiri | Okushiri Airport | | |
| Misawa | Misawa Airport | | |
| Nemuro-Nakashibetsu | Nemuro Nakashibetsu Airport | | |

== Fleet ==
=== Current fleet ===
As of July 2026, Hokkaido Air System operates the following aircraft:

Hokkaido Air System fleet
| Aircraft | In fleet | Orders | Passengers | Notes |
|---|---|---|---|---|
| ATR 42-600 | 4 | — | 48 | |
| Total | 4 | — | | |

=== Former fleet ===
As of August 2025, Hokkaido Air System operated 4 ATR 42-600.
