= Meitetsu 2000 series =

Japanese train type

Meitetsu 2000 series “μSky”

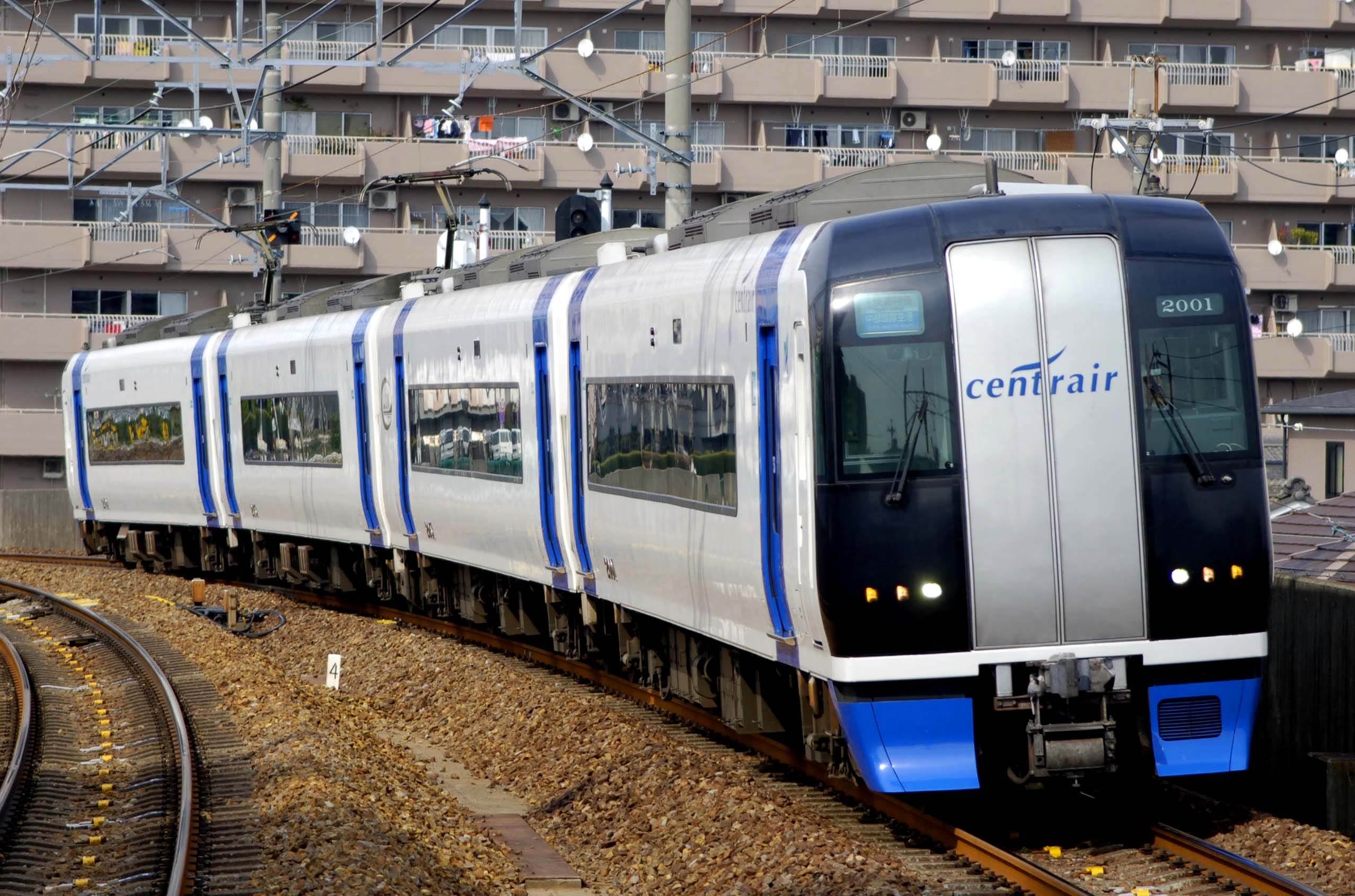
- Meitetsu 2000 series
- In service: January 2005 – present
- Manufacturer: Nippon Sharyo
- Entered service: 2005
- Number built: 48 vehicles (12 sets)
- Number in service: 48 vehicles (12 sets)
- Formation: 4 cars per trainset
- Capacity: 181
- Operator: Nagoya Railroad

Specifications
- Car body construction: Steel
- Doors: 2 per side
- Maximum speed: 120 km/h (75 mph)
- Acceleration: 2.3 km/(h⋅s) (1.4 mph/s)
- Deceleration: 3.5 km/(h⋅s) (2.2 mph/s)(service); 4.2 km/(h⋅s) (2.6 mph/s) (emergency)
- Electric system: 1,500 V DC
- Current collection: Overhead catenary
- Safety system: ATS
- Track gauge: 1,067 mm (3 ft 6 in)

The Meitetsu 2000 series (名鉄2000系) is a tilting electric multiple unit (EMU) train type operated by Nagoya Railroad (Meitetsu) on limited express services in Japan since January 2005.

== Operations ==
The 2000 series operates as an access train serving Central Japan International Airport (Centrair), and entered service in January 2005, shortly before the airport opened. The trains made up of 2000 series cars are known as μSky (ミュースカイ, myū sukai), a combination of "μTicket" which is Meitetsu's ticket for first class seats, plus "sky" in reference to the airport. μSky trains can reach Central Japan International Airport Station from Meitetsu-Nagoya Station in 28 minutes with a maximum speed of 120km/h.

While intended for rapid airport service, this train also serves other routes as a regular limited express train.

== Formations ==
The fleet of 12 four-car sets are formed as shown below, with one trailer (T) car and three motored (M) cars. The Mo 2150 cars were added to the original 3-car sets in 2006.

Car No.	1	2	3	4
Designation	Tc	M	M1	Mc
Numbering	2000	2050	2150	2100

Cars 3 and 4 are each equipped with one single-arm pantograph. Car 2 has a toilet.

Each four-car set can carry up to 181 passengers.

The maximum acceleration velocity is 2.3km/h/s and the common deceleration velocity is 3.5km/h/s with an emergency potential of 4.2km/h/s.

== Seats and facilities ==
Seating is arranged 2+2 abreast throughout with a seat pitch of 1,000 mm (39 in). Each car has four luggage spaces (Except a number of sets). Each seat has continuous large windows with UV-cut glass and roll-up curtains that can be operated individually by customers.

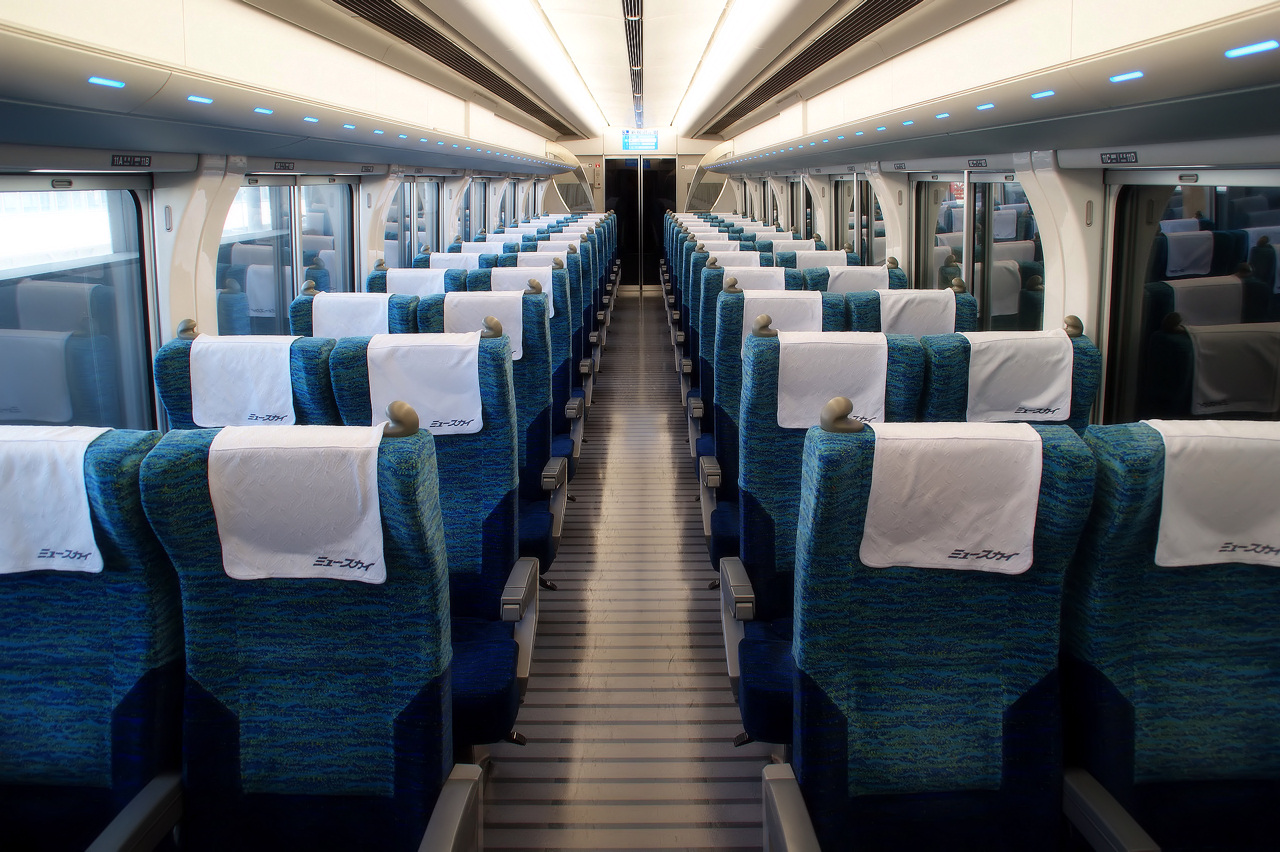
Interior view

== History ==
The trains entered service on 29 January 2005, initially formed as a fleet of 10 three-car sets. From 29 April 2006, additional cars were added to the fleet to form 12 4-car sets to cope with demand.

== Awards ==
In October 2005, the 2000 series was awarded the "Good Design" award.

In June 2006, the train was one of the four recipients of the 46th Laurel Prize presented annually by the Japan Railfan Club. A presentation ceremony was held at Central Japan International Airport Station on 4 November 2006.

== Special liveries ==
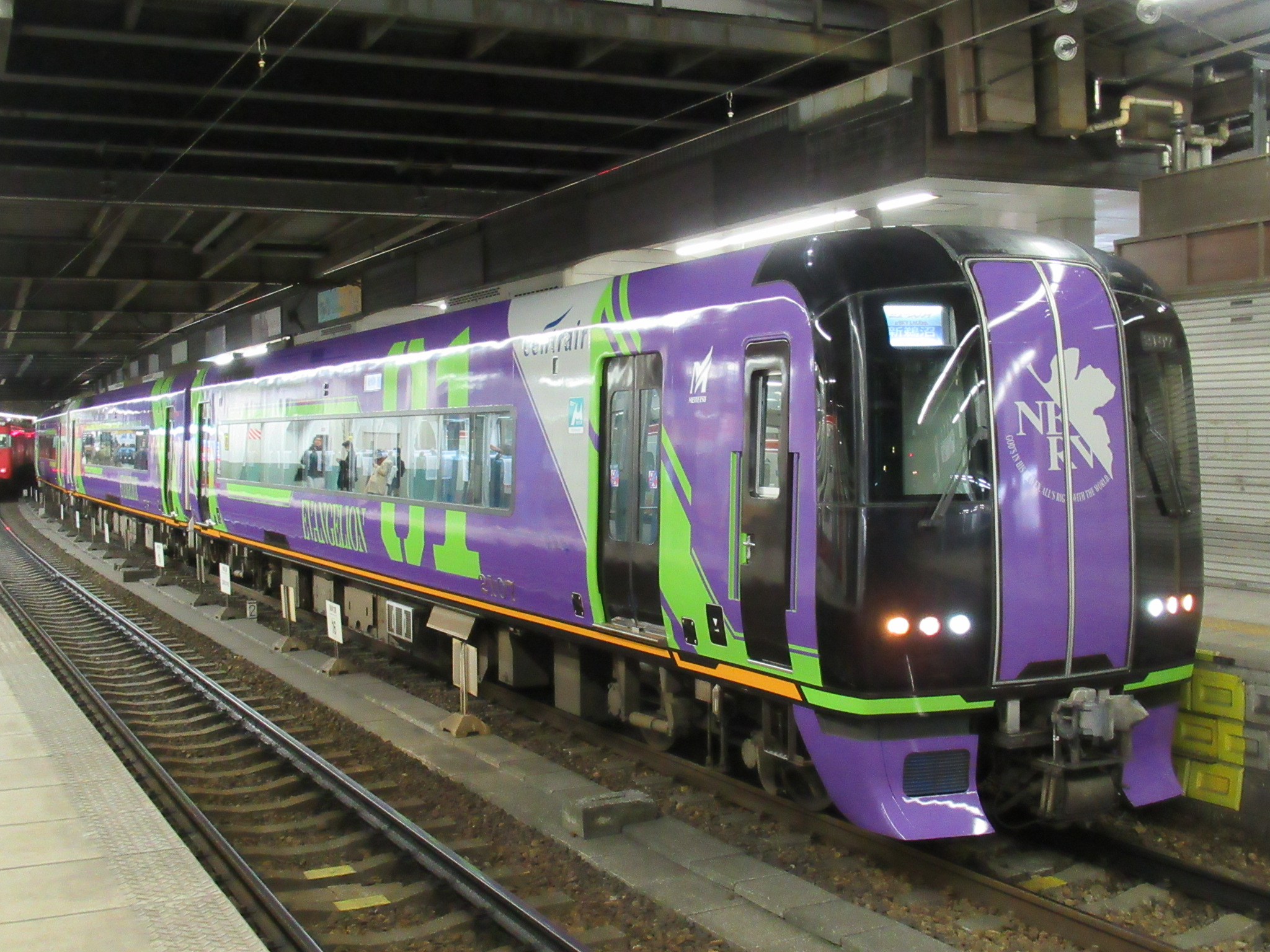
The wrapped trainset in February 2020

From 14 January 2020, 2000 series set 2007 was wrapped in a Neon Genesis Evangelion-inspired livery.

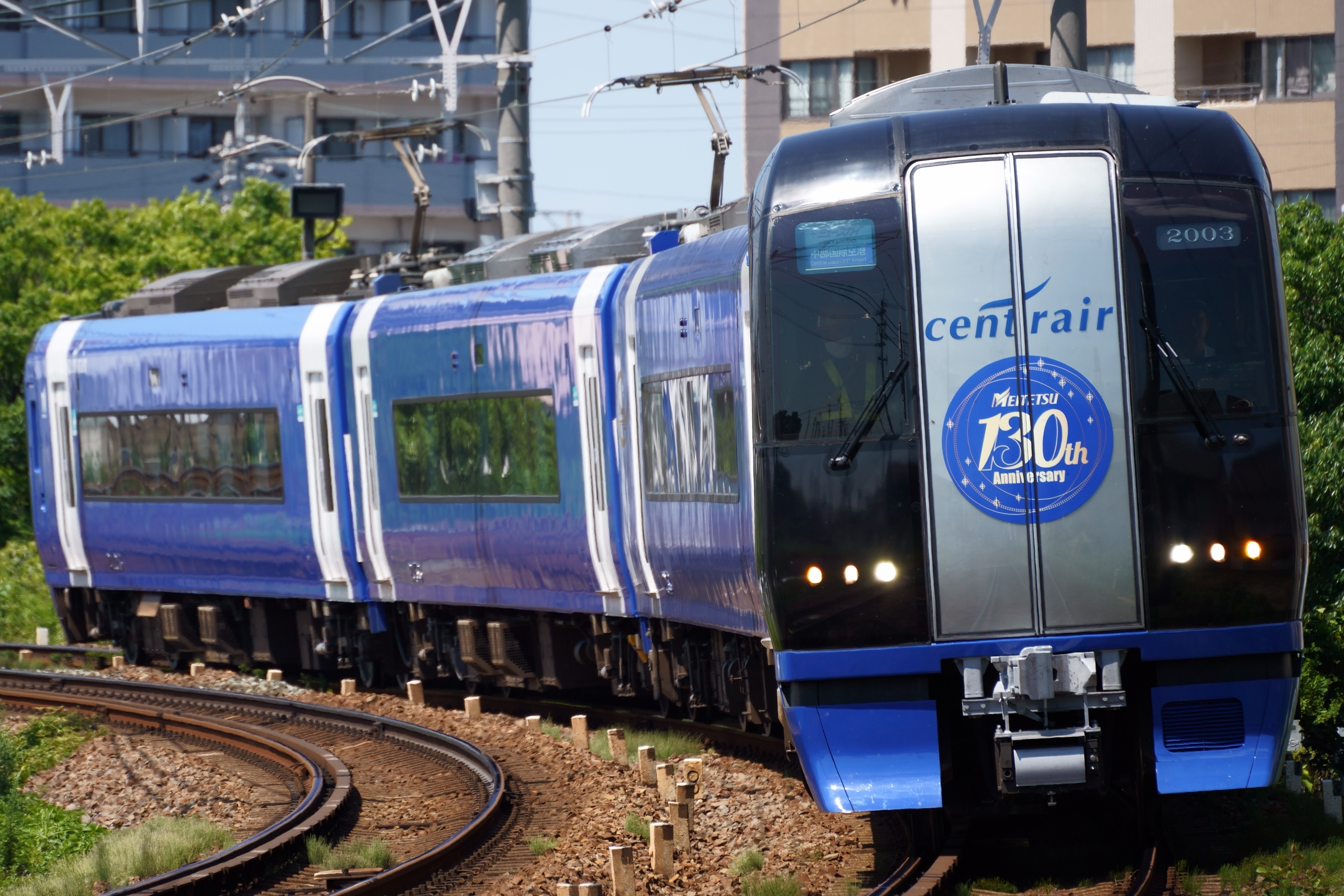
"Blue μ Sky" in June 2024

From 29 June 2024, celebrating 130th year of the Meitetsu, 2000 series set 2003 has been reverse-painted and operated as "Blue μ Sky".
