= New Chitose Airport =

Largest commercial airport serving Sapporo, Hokkaido, Japan

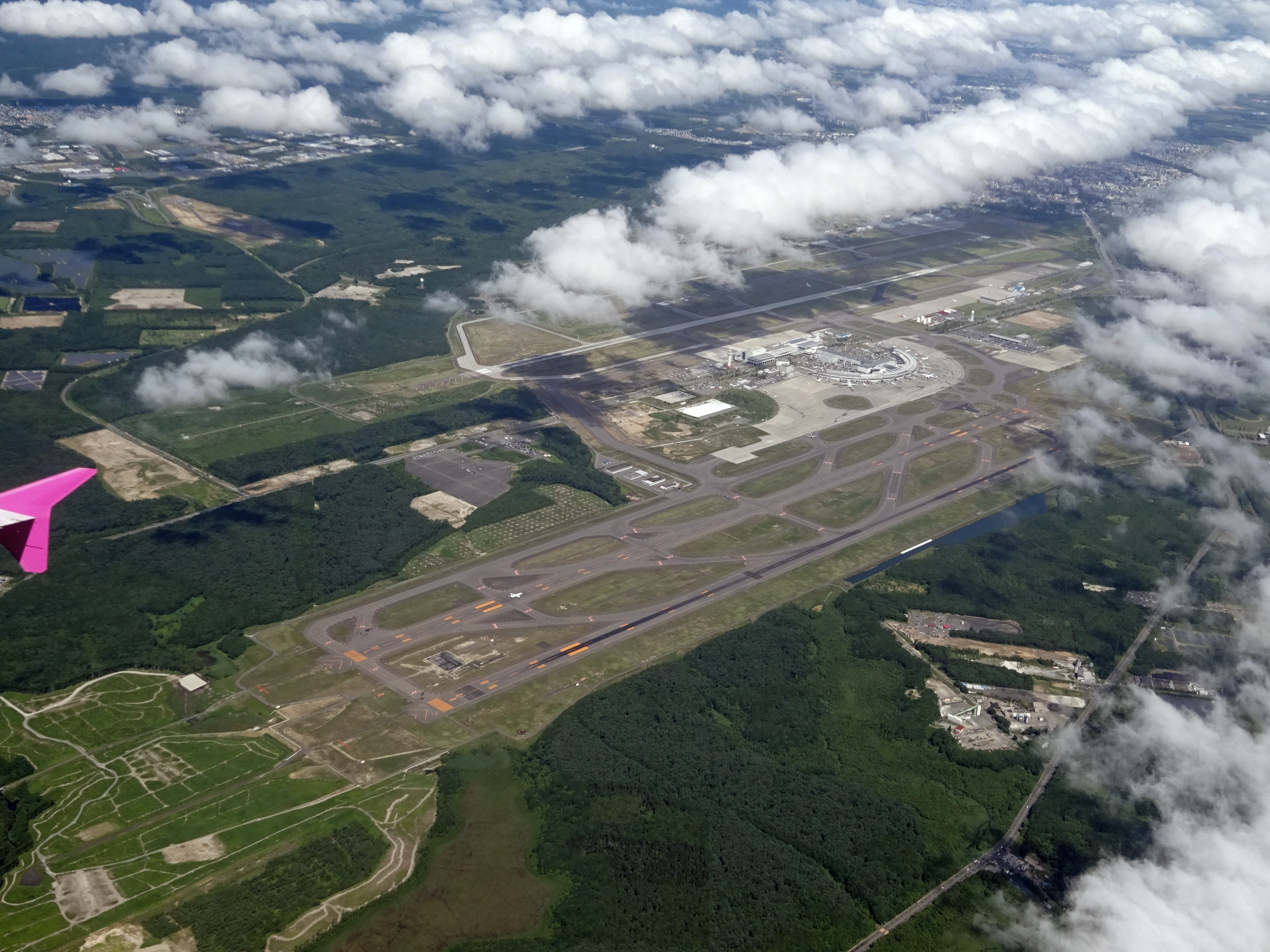
- New Chitose Airport
- IATA: CTS; ICAO: RJCC

Summary
- Airport type: Public
- Owner: Ministry of Land, Infrastructure, Transport and Tourism
- Operator: Hokkaido Airports Ltd.
- Serves: Sapporo metropolitan area
- Location: Chitose, Hokkaido, Japan
- Opened: July 20, 1988; 38 years ago
- Focus city for: All Nippon Airways; Japan Airlines
- Operating base for: Air Do; Skymark Airlines
- Elevation AMSL: 70 ft (21 m)
- Coordinates: 42°46′31″N 141°41′33″E
- Website: www.hokkaido-airports.com/en/new-chitose/

Map
- Location in Hokkaido Location in Japan

Runways
Direction	Length		Surface
Direction	m	ft	Surface
01R/19L	3,000	9,843	Asphalt/concrete
01L/19R	3,000	9,843	Asphalt/concrete
18R/36L	2,700	8,858	Asphalt
18L/36R	4,000	13,123	Concrete

Statistics (2024)
- Passengers: 23,968,186
- Cargo (metric tonnes): 144,408
- Source: Japanese Ministry of Land, Infrastructure, Transport and Tourism

New Chitose Airport (新千歳空港, Shin-Chitose Kūkō) (IATA: CTS, ICAO: RJCC) is an international airport located 2.7 nautical miles (5.0 km; 3.1 mi) south-southeast of Chitose and Tomakomai, Hokkaidō, Japan, serving the Sapporo metropolitan area. By both traffic and land area, it is the largest airport in Hokkaidō.

It is adjacent to Chitose Air Base, a Japan Air Self-Defense Force base which houses F-15 Eagle fighter jets, the Japanese Air Force One government aircraft and a number of smaller emergency response aircraft and helicopters. Chitose and New Chitose have separate runways but are interconnected by taxiways, and aircraft at either facility can enter the other by ground if permitted; the runways at Chitose are occasionally used to relieve runway closures at New Chitose due to winter weather.

New Chitose Airport is one of six 24-hour airports in Japan, but it is the only inland airport; also, this airport has daily opening hours limit unlike other 24-hour operational airport terminals.

As of 2018, it was the fifth-busiest airport in Japan, serving 23.7 million passengers, and ranked 64th in the world in terms of passengers carried. The 819 km (509 mi) Sapporo–Tokyo Haneda route is the second busiest air route in the world, with 12.1 million passengers carried in 2025.

The airport continues to upgrade its facilities to accommodate the growing number of passengers, and Skytrax has it ranked 49th in the top 100 airports in the world in 2024, a jump up from 102nd the previous year. As a result, the airport was awarded Skytrax's World's Most Improved Airport for 2024.

== History ==
New Chitose opened on July 20, 1988, to replace the adjacent Chitose Airport, a joint-use facility which had served passenger flights since 1963. The airport's IATA airport code was originally SPK. This code was later adopted as a city code to refer to both New Chitose and the smaller Okadama Airport in central Sapporo, which handles commuter flights within Hokkaido.

New Chitose became Japan's first 24-hour airport in 1994. Services between 10 PM and 7 AM are currently limited to six flights per day due to noise alleviation concerns. Four of these slots are currently used by passenger flights to Tokyo while the other two are used by cargo flights.

New Chitose previously had long-haul service to Amsterdam (KLM, 1997–2002), Cairns (Qantas, 1992–1998 and 2004–2007) and Honolulu (JALWays, 1992–2003, Hawaiian Airlines since 2012). Service to Europe had resumed when Finnair launched a new weekly flight to Helsinki from 15 December 2019, but this service was terminated during the COVID-19 pandemic. International services are mainly for transporting tourists from the rest of Asia and for sightseeing and skiing. The area surrounding gates 0 through 2, on the north end of the main terminal, was a sterile area for international flights until the international terminal opened for service on March 26, 2010.

The airport was upgraded with a new VIP lounge and other dedicated facilities for the 34th G8 summit, held in Hokkaido in 2008.

Due to the airport's sharing of air traffic control with Chitose Air Base, daytime civil operations are limited to 32 takeoffs and landings per hour, and operations by certain foreign aircraft (including Chinese and Russian aircraft) are prohibited on Mondays and Thursdays. These restrictions were scheduled to be eased in March 2017. A second terminal was built roughly doubling the existing terminal and capacity, completed by August 2019. The second terminal is used to handle international flights.

== Operations ==
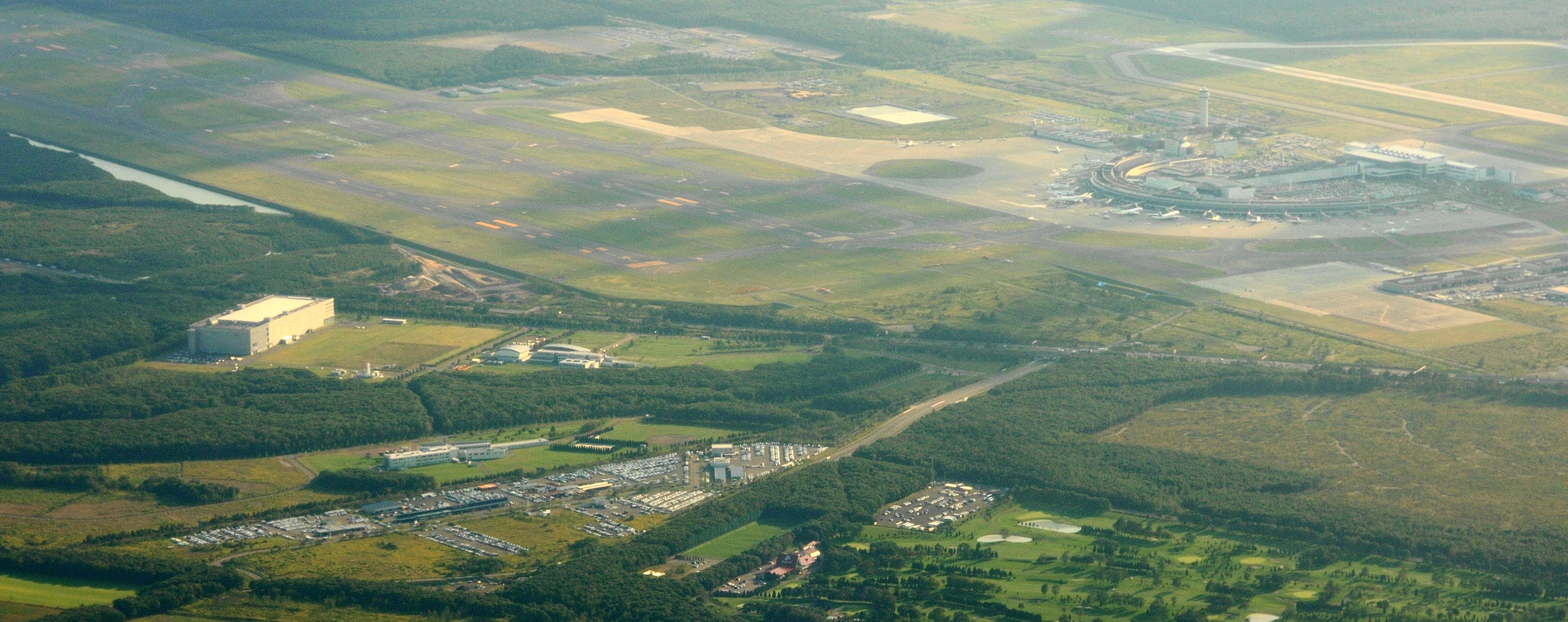
Aerial view of New Chitose Airport

The airport has a semicircular domestic terminal (reminiscent of the semicircular terminals at Dallas Fort Worth International Airport) with eighteen gates, and a smaller international terminal with eight gates on the west side.

Operating hours for international flights at CTS are restricted by the Japanese government in order to avoid interference with JASDF operations at the adjacent air base. As of April 2012, international flights are permitted on Tuesdays and Wednesdays from 12:00 to 16:00, and from 17:00 on Friday through 23:59 on Sunday.

== Airlines and destinations ==
=== Passenger ===
Airlines	Destinations
Aero K	Cheongju
Air Busan	Busan, Seoul–Incheon
Air Canada	Seasonal: Vancouver (begins 18 December 2026)
Air Do	Fukuoka, Kobe, Nagoya–Centrair, Sendai, Tokyo–Haneda
Air Premia	Seoul–Incheon (begins 2 December 2026)
Air Seoul	Seoul–Incheon
AirAsia X	Seasonal: Kuala Lumpur–International
All Nippon Airways	Fukuoka, Kobe, Komatsu, Osaka–Itami, Tokyo–Haneda, Tokyo–Narita
ANA Wings	Akita, Aomori, Fukuoka, Fukushima, Hakodate, Hiroshima, Kushiro, Memanbetsu, Nagoya–Centrair, Nakashibetsu, Niigata, Osaka–Itami, Sendai, Shizuoka (ends 30 September 2026), Toyama, Wakkanai; Seasonal: Okayama, Rishiri
Asiana Airlines	Seoul–Incheon
Cathay Pacific	Hong Kong
Cebu Pacific	Manila (resumes 27 October 2026)
China Airlines	Taipei–Taoyuan
China Eastern Airlines	Shanghai–Pudong
Eastar Jet	Busan, Seoul–Incheon
EVA Air	Taipei–Taoyuan
Fuji Dream Airlines	Fukuoka, Matsumoto, Niigata, Shizuoka, Yamagata
Greater Bay Airlines	Hong Kong
Hong Kong Airlines	Hong Kong
Ibex Airlines	Sendai
J-Air	Aomori, Hanamaki, Hiroshima, Memanbetsu, Osaka–Itami, Sendai
Japan Airlines	Fukuoka, Nagoya–Centrair, Osaka–Itami, Osaka–Kansai, Tokyo–Haneda, Shanghai-Pudong
Jeju Air	Busan, Seoul–Incheon
Jetstar Japan	Nagoya–Centrair, Osaka–Kansai, Tokyo–Narita
Jin Air	Busan, Seoul–Incheon
Juneyao Air	Shanghai–Pudong
Korean Air	Seoul–Incheon
Parata Air	Seoul–Incheon
Peach Aviation	Fukuoka, Nagoya–Centrair, Naha, Osaka–Kansai, Sendai, Tokyo–Narita
Philippine Airlines	Seasonal: Manila
Qantas	Seasonal: Sydney
Scoot	Singapore, Taipei–Taoyuan
Singapore Airlines	Seasonal: Singapore
Skymark Airlines	Fukuoka, Ibaraki, Kobe, Nagoya–Centrair, Tokyo–Haneda
Spring Airlines	Shanghai–Pudong
Spring Japan	Tokyo–Narita
Starlux Airlines	Taipei–Taoyuan
Thai AirAsia	Chiang Mai, Taipei–Taoyuan
Thai AirAsia X	Bangkok–Don Mueang
Thai Airways International	Bangkok–Suvarnabhumi
Thai Lion Air	Bangkok–Don Mueang, Kaohsiung
Thai VietJet Air	Bangkok–Suvarnabhumi, Taipei–Taoyuan
Tigerair Taiwan	Kaohsiung, Taipei–Taoyuan
Trinity Airways	Busan, Daegu, Seoul–Incheon
United Airlines	Seasonal: San Francisco (begins 11 December 2026)

=== Cargo ===
Airlines	Destinations
AirZeta	Seoul–Incheon

== Other facilities ==
The domestic terminal contains a hot spa, a cinema complex, museums, and a 188-room hotel, the Air Terminal Hotel.

The international terminal is also equipped with a luxury hotel, the Hotel Portom International.

China Airlines operates its Sapporo office on the third floor of the airport building.

The airline Hokkaido Air System was at one time headquartered in the New Chitose airport terminal. Now its head office is on the property of Okadama Airport in Higashi-ku, Sapporo.

== Ground transportation ==
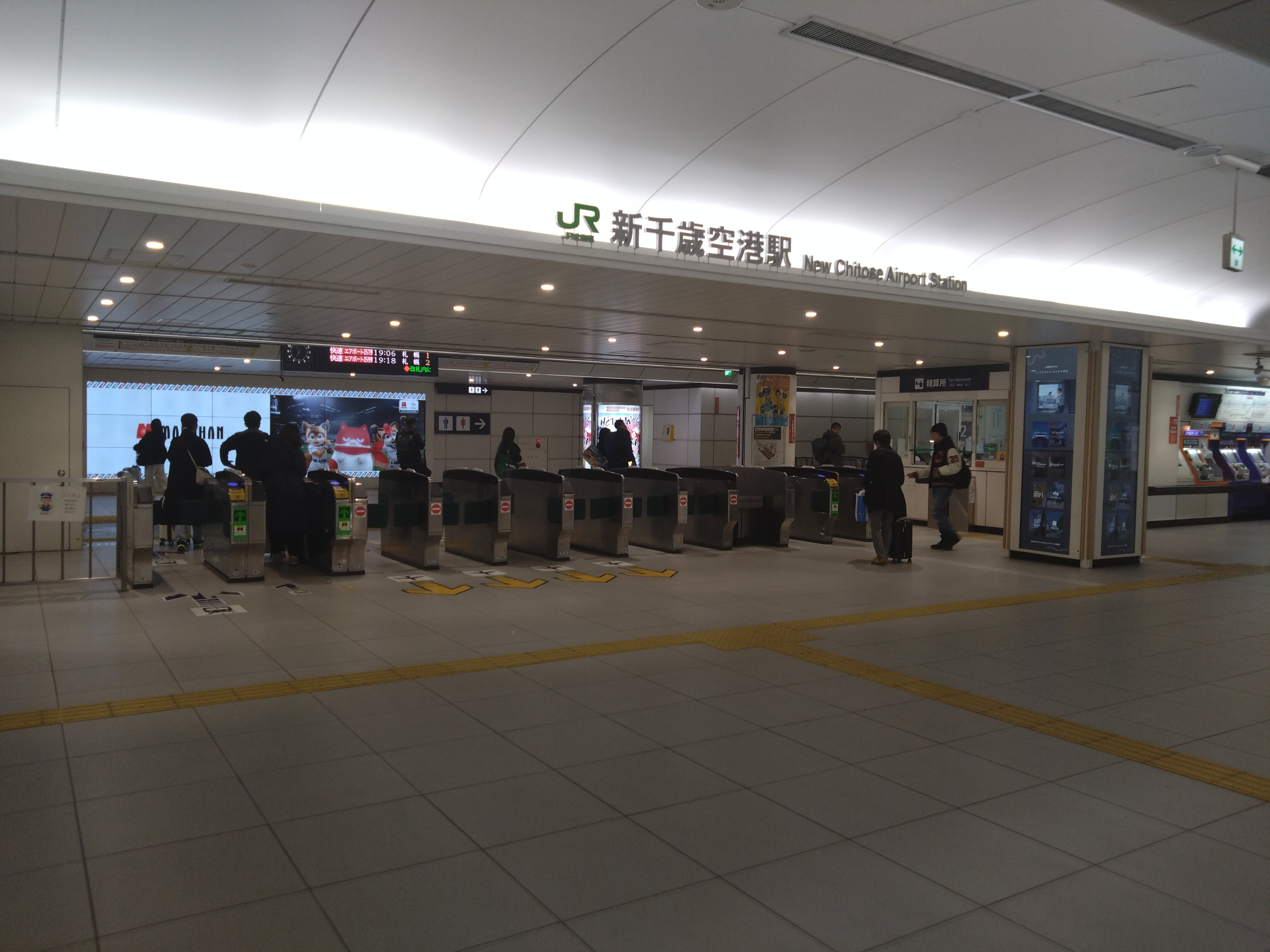
New Chitose Airport Station

=== Railways ===
New Chitose Airport Station is located on a spur off the Chitose Line of Hokkaido Railway Company (JR Hokkaido). The fastest time to Sapporo Station is 33 minutes on the Rapid Airport Service Trains, and the fastest time to Otaru Station is 73 minutes. Due to the ever-increasing number of passengers, trains to Sapporo Station are becoming seriously crowded.

=== Bus ===
- Hokkaidō Chūō Bus/Hokuto Kotsu joint service (Sapporo 4 trips/h, Oyachi 4 trips/h)
- Hokkaidō Chūō Bus (Asabu 1–2 trips/h, Miyanosawa 1–2 trips/h)
- Hokuto Kotsu (Apa Hotel & Resort 2 trips/h, Maruyama Park hourly)
- Donan Bus (Tomakomai 1–2 trips/h, Noboribetsu 3 trips/day, Muroran 12 trips/day, Hobetsu 2 trips/day, Urakawa 2 trips/day)
- Atsuma Bus (Atsuma 3 trips/day)
