= Kushiro Airport =

Airport in Japan

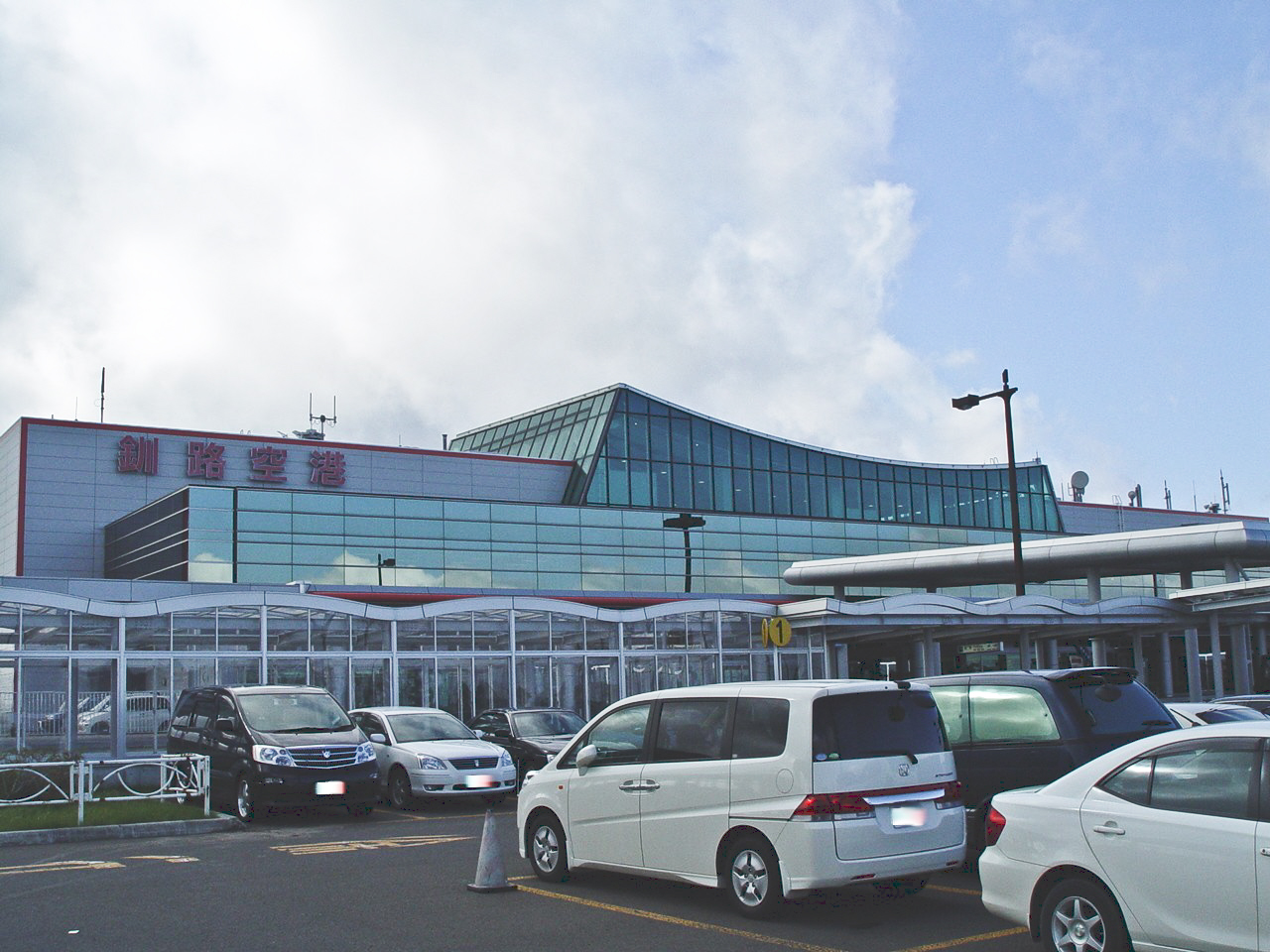
- IATA: KUH; ICAO: RJCK

Summary
- Airport type: Public
- Owner: Ministry of Land, Infrastructure, Transport and Tourism
- Operator: Hokkaido Airports
- Location: Kushiro, Hokkaido, Japan
- Opened: July 1961; 65 years ago
- Elevation AMSL: 311 ft / 95 m
- Coordinates: 43°02′27″N 144°11′35″E

Map
- Location in Hokkaidō Location in Japan

Runways
Direction	Length		Surface
Direction	m	ft	Surface
17/35	2,500	8,202	Asphalt concrete

Statistics (2015)
- Passengers: 685,379
- Cargo (metric tonnes): 2,452
- Aircraft movement: 10,043
- Source: Japanese Ministry of Land, Infrastructure, Transport and Tourism

Kushiro Airport (釧路空港, Kushiro Kūkō) (IATA: KUH, ICAO: RJCK) is an airport, located 17 km (11 mi) west-northwest of the center of Kushiro, Hokkaidō, Japan.

== Airlines and destinations ==
Airlines	Destinations
Air Do	Tokyo–Haneda
ANA Wings	Sapporo–Chitose
Hokkaido Air System	Sapporo–Okadama
Japan Airlines	Tokyo–Haneda
Peach Aviation	Seasonal: Osaka–Kansai, Tokyo–Narita

International charter flights to Kushiro began in 2000 and have operated from South Korea, Taiwan and Hong Kong.

== History ==
The airport opened in July 1961 with a 1,200 meter runway. It has been expanded and upgraded several times; a taxiway parallel to the runway opened in 1988, a Category 3a instrument landing system (ILS) became operational in 1995, and a new passenger terminal, 2.6 times the size of the original terminal, opened in 1998.

== Terminal ==
Kushiro Airport has a single passenger terminal on three levels with three boarding gates. It is designed primarily for domestic flights, but has limited customs and immigration facilities for international charter arrivals.

== Ground transport ==
A bus service runs between the airport and the town of Kushiro, taking about 25 minutes and calling at the railway station, "MOO" shopping complex and a few other locations. The bus is approximately timed with flight arrivals / departures. There is no rail link connecting the airport.
