= Hakodate Airport =

Airport in Hakodate, Hokkaido, Japan

Hakodate Airport 函館空港

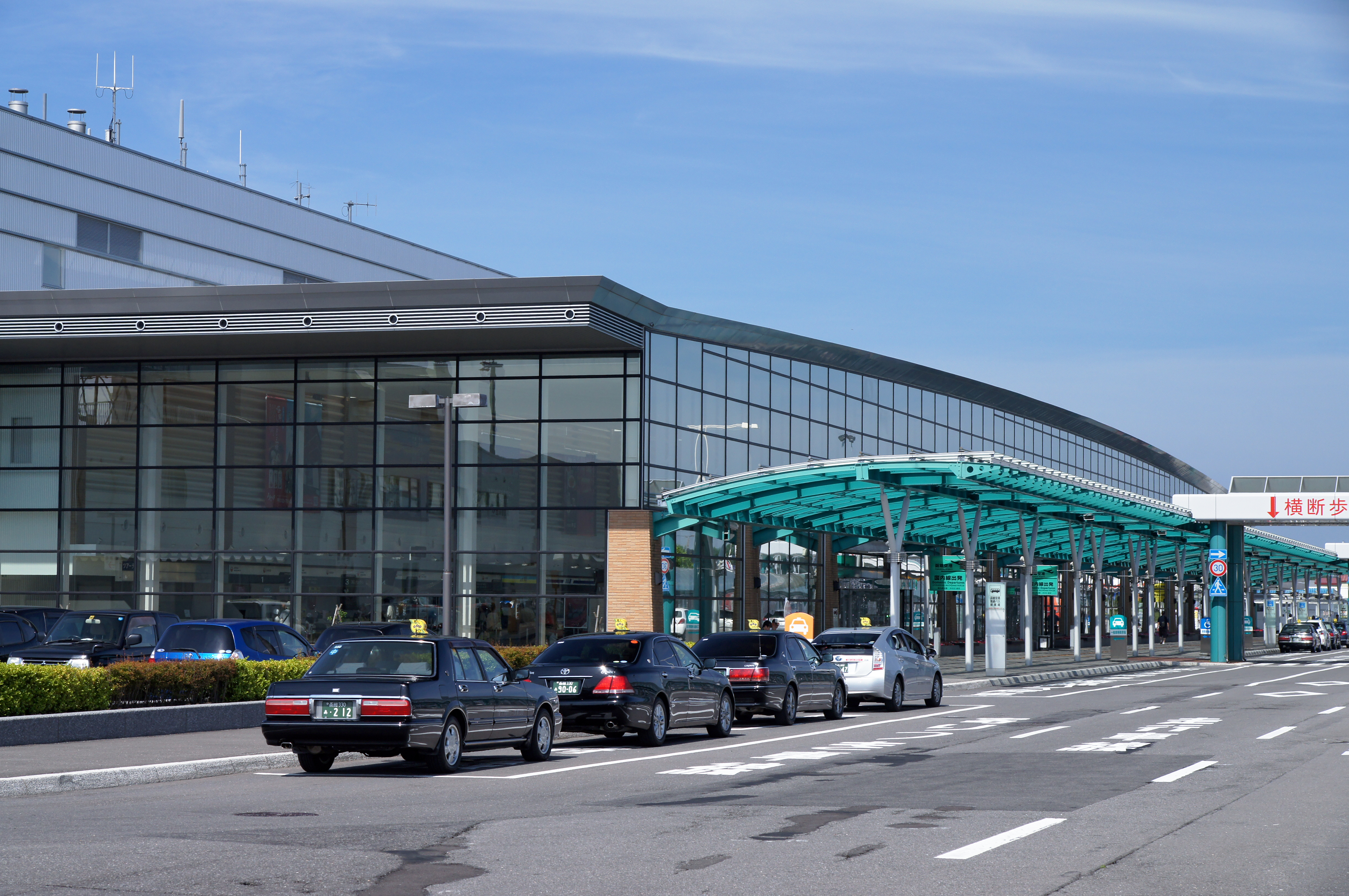
- IATA: HKD; ICAO: RJCH; WMO: 47488

Summary
- Airport type: Public
- Owner: Ministry of Land, Infrastructure, Transport and Tourism
- Operator: Hokkaido Airports
- Serves: Hakodate, Hokkaido, Japan
- Opened: 1961; 65 years ago
- Elevation AMSL: 112 ft (34 m)
- Coordinates: 41°46′12″N 140°49′19″E
- Website: English website

Map
- Location in Hokkaidō Location in Japan

Runways
Direction	Length		Surface
Direction	m	ft	Surface
12/30	3,000	9,843	Asphalt/concrete

Statistics (2015)
- Passengers: 1,772,052
- Cargo (metric tonnes): 8,433
- Aircraft movement: 18,129
- Source: Japanese Ministry of Land, Infrastructure, Transport and Tourism

Hakodate Airport (函館空港, Hakodate Kūkō) (IATA: HKD, ICAO: RJCH) is an airport located 7.6 km (4.7 mi) east of Hakodate Station in Hakodate, a city in Hokkaidō, Japan. It is owned by the Ministry of Land, Infrastructure, Transport and Tourism and operated by Hokkaido Airports.

== History ==
Hakodate Airport opened in 1961 with a single, 1,200-meter runway. A new terminal upgrade and runway extension to 2,000 m became operational in 1971. The runway was extended further to 2,500 m in 1978 and to 3,000 m in 1999. A new terminal building opened in 2005.

On September 6, 1976, Soviet pilot Viktor Belenko defected to the West by landing a MiG-25 Foxbat aircraft at Hakodate Airport.

On June 21, 1995, All Nippon Airways Flight 857, a scheduled Boeing 747 flight from Tokyo to Hakodate, was hijacked by Fumio Kutsumi, a Tokyo bank employee armed with a screwdriver. Kutsumi claimed to be acting on behalf of Aum Shinrikyo cult group leader Shoko Asahara. The aircraft landed in Hakodate and stayed on the runway overnight for 15 hours before riot police stormed the aircraft at dawn and freed the passengers.

== Airlines and destinations ==
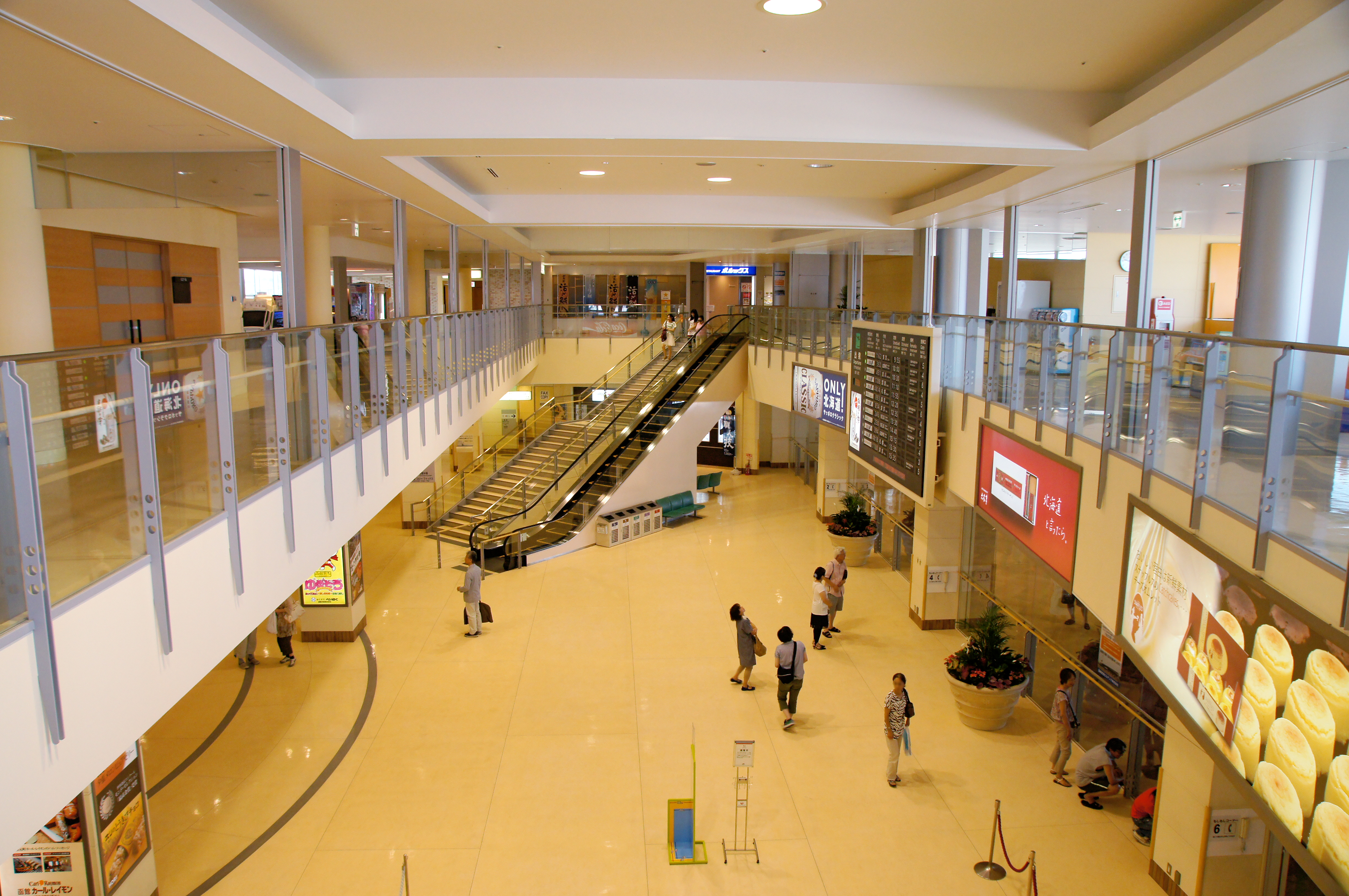
The terminal interior

Airlines	Destinations
Air Do	Nagoya–Centrair, Tokyo–Haneda
All Nippon Airways	Osaka–Itami, Tokyo–Haneda, Nagoya–Centrair
ANA Wings	Sapporo–Chitose
Hokkaido Air System	Okushiri, Sapporo–Okadama
J-Air	Osaka–Itami
Japan Airlines	Tokyo–Haneda
Starlux Airlines	Taipei–Taoyuan
Jeju Air	Seoul–Incheon
Tigerair Taiwan	Taipei–Taoyuan

== Ground transportation ==
Scheduled buses operate to Hakodate Station and the Onuma Prince Hotel.

== In popular culture ==
- The animated film Detective Conan: Magician of the Silver Sky depicts an emergency landing at the airport.
