= Okushiri Airport =

Airport in Okushiri, Hokkaido, Japan

Okushiri Airport 奥尻空港
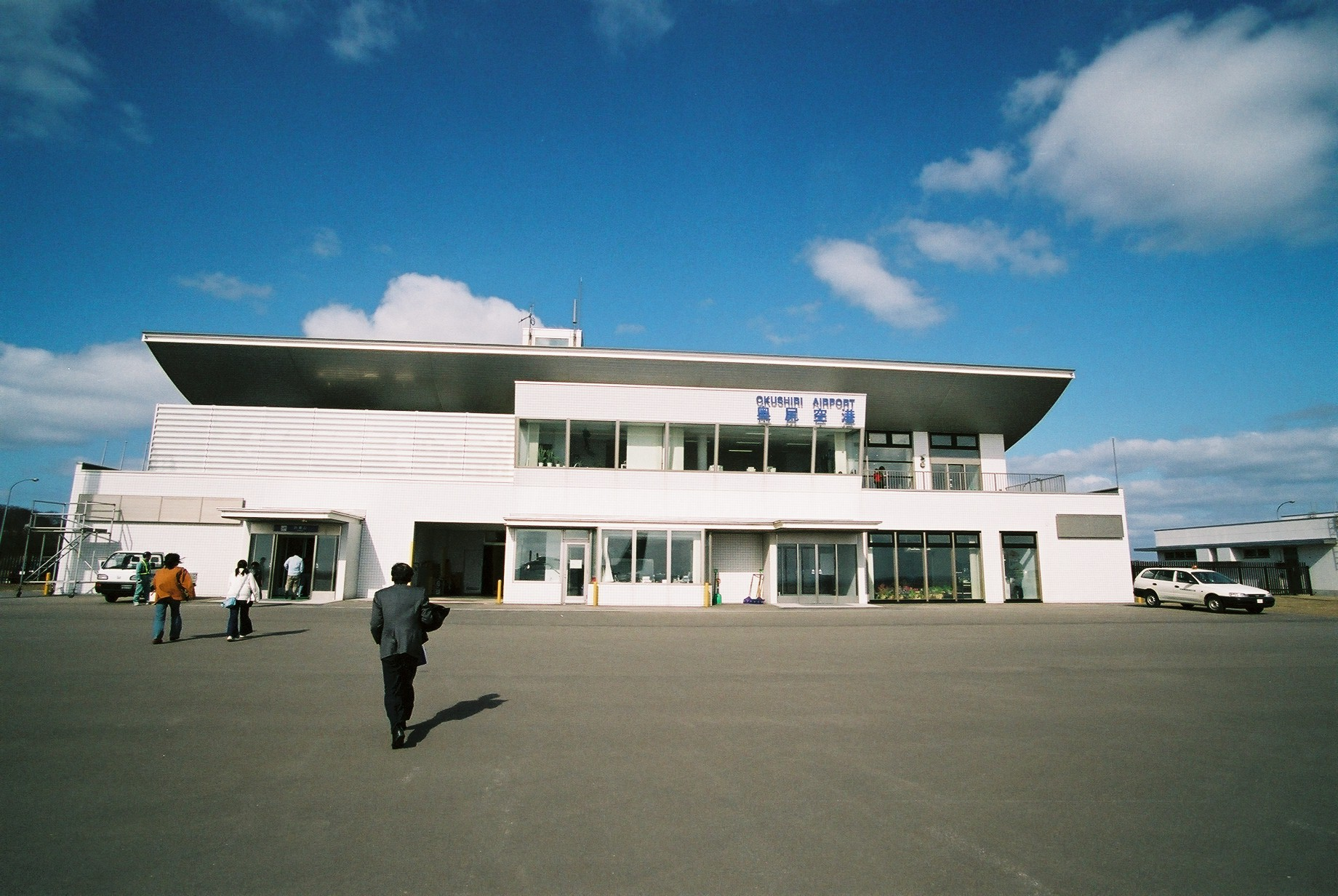
- IATA: OIR; ICAO: RJEO

Summary
- Airport type: Public
- Operator: Hokkaido Prefecture
- Location: Okushiri, Hokkaido, Japan
- Elevation AMSL: 161 ft (49 m)
- Coordinates: 42°04′18″N 139°25′58″E

Map
- Location in Japan RJEO (Japan)

Runways
Direction	Length		Surface
Direction	m	ft	Surface
13/31	1,500	4,921	Asphalt concrete

Statistics (2015)
- Passengers: 10,995
- Cargo (metric tonnes): 4
- Aircraft movement: 794
- Source: Japanese Ministry of Land, Infrastructure, Transport and Tourism

Okushiri Airport (奥尻空港, Okushiri Kūkō) (IATA: OIR, ICAO: RJEO) is an airport located in Okushiri, Okushiri Island, Hokkaido, Japan.

== History ==
Okushiri Airport was granted airport status in June 1973 and the airport was officially opened in September 1974. Services began to Hakodate and Sapporo Okadama in October 1974. Between 2004 and 2006, Okushiri Airport was redesigned and a new terminal building with a new 1,500 meter runway was constructed over the current airport. The former 800 meter runway was abolished and the former terminal building was converted into a warehouse for a local construction company.

== Airlines and destinations ==
Airlines	Destinations
Hokkaido Air System	Hakodate, Sapporo–Okadama

== Gallery ==
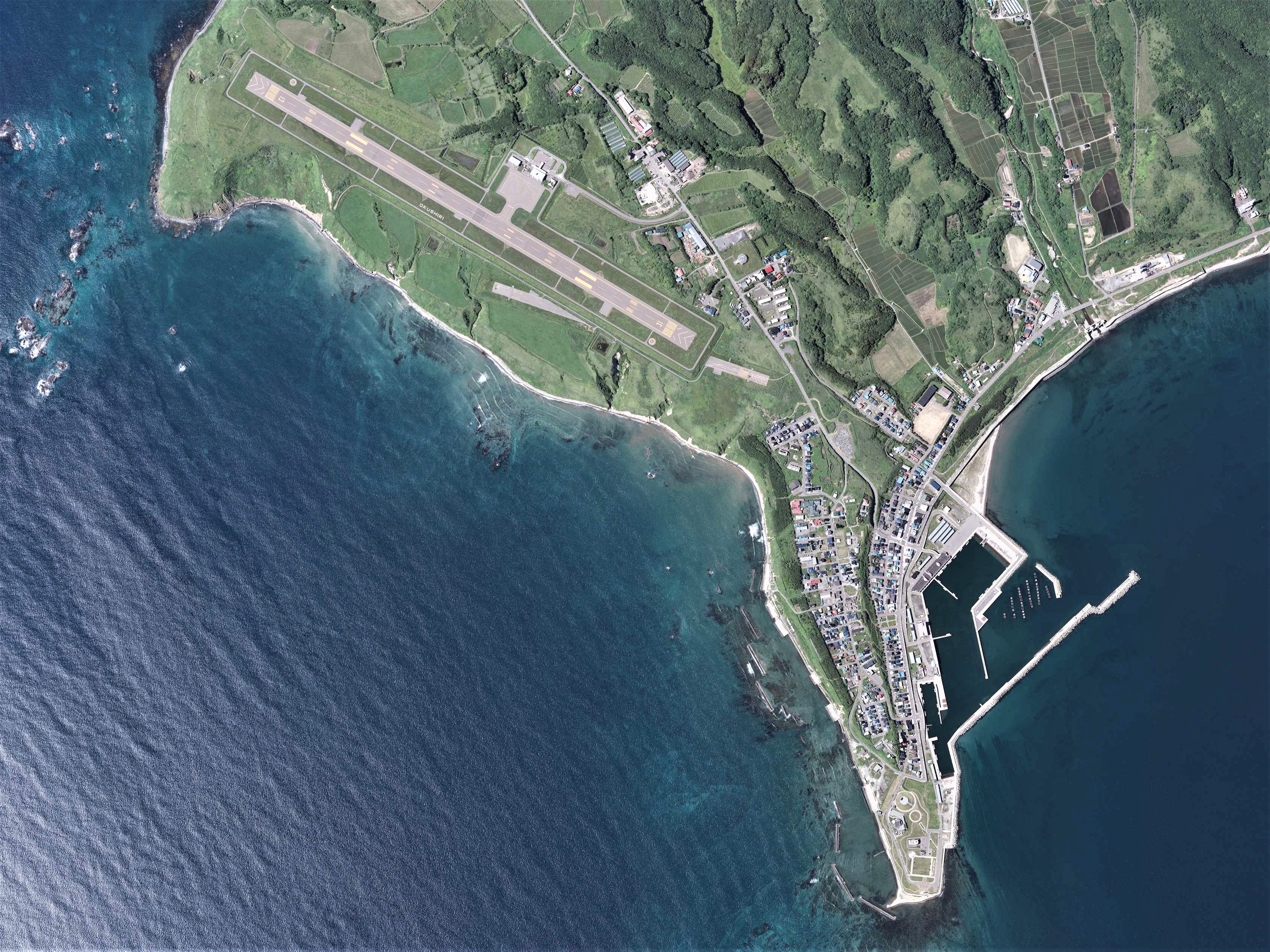
Aerial photograph of the airport taken on July 5, 2017. Note the former runway still visible on the south end of the current runway.

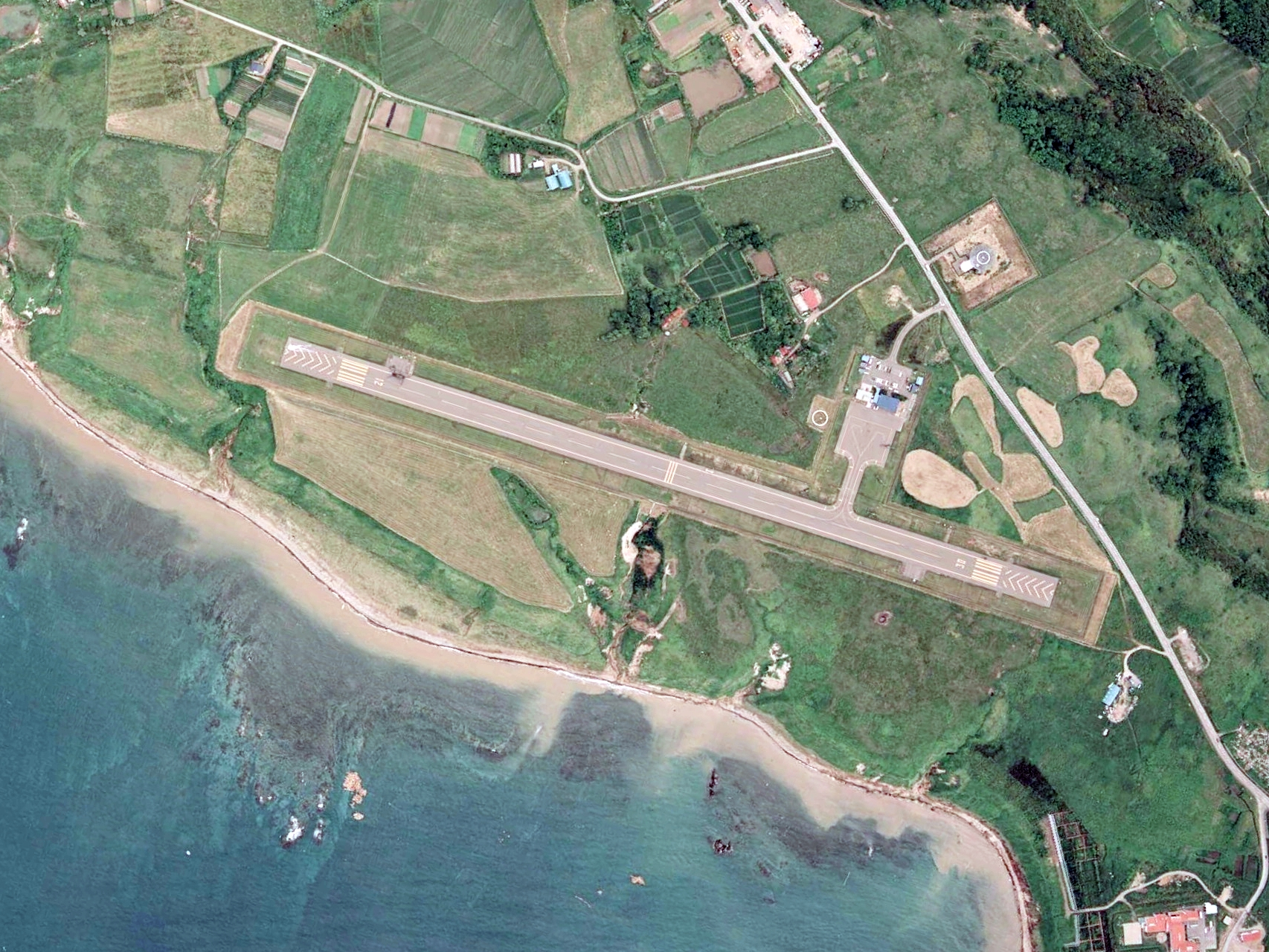
Aerial photograph of the former airport taken in 1993.

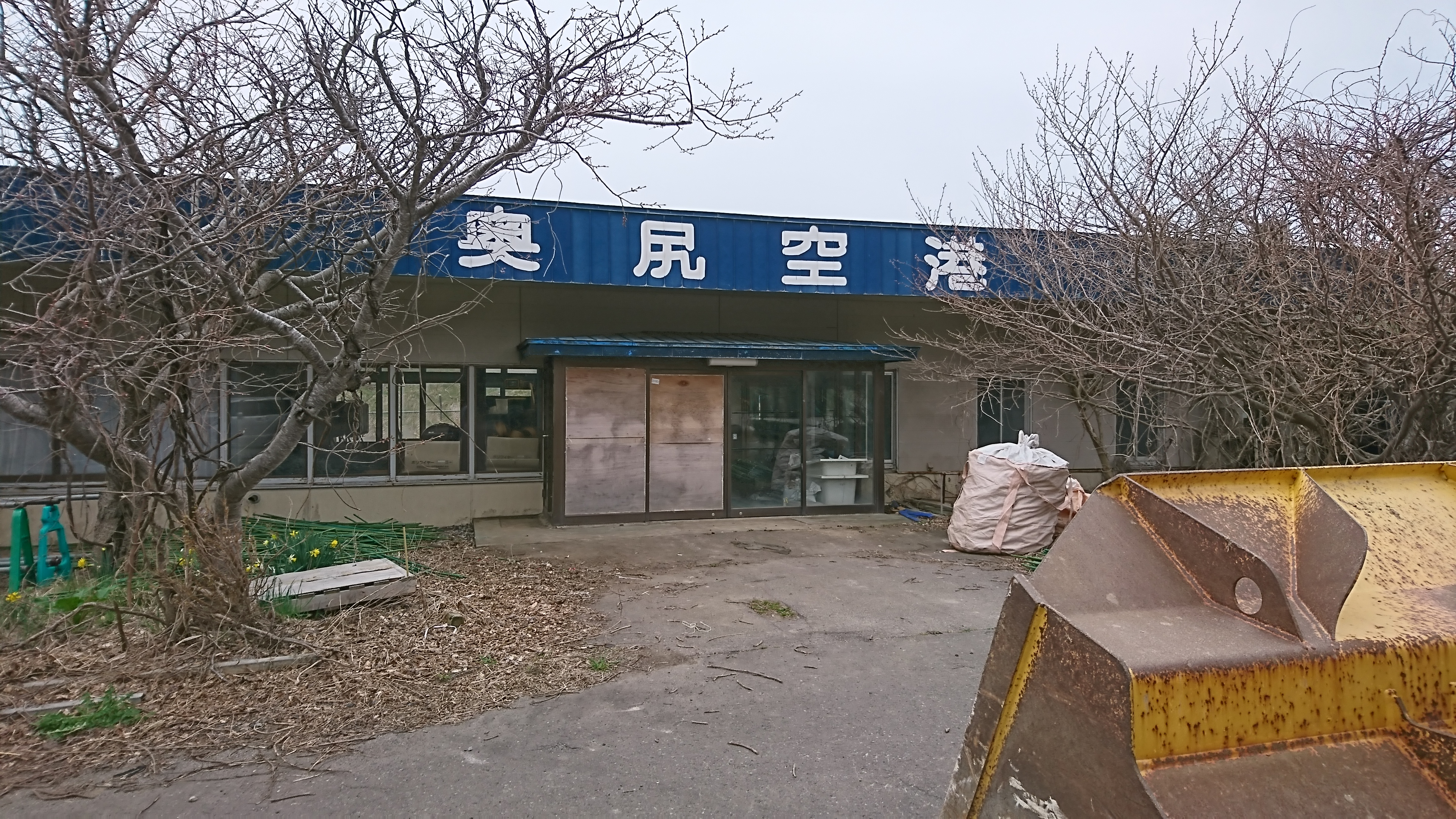
Former terminal building

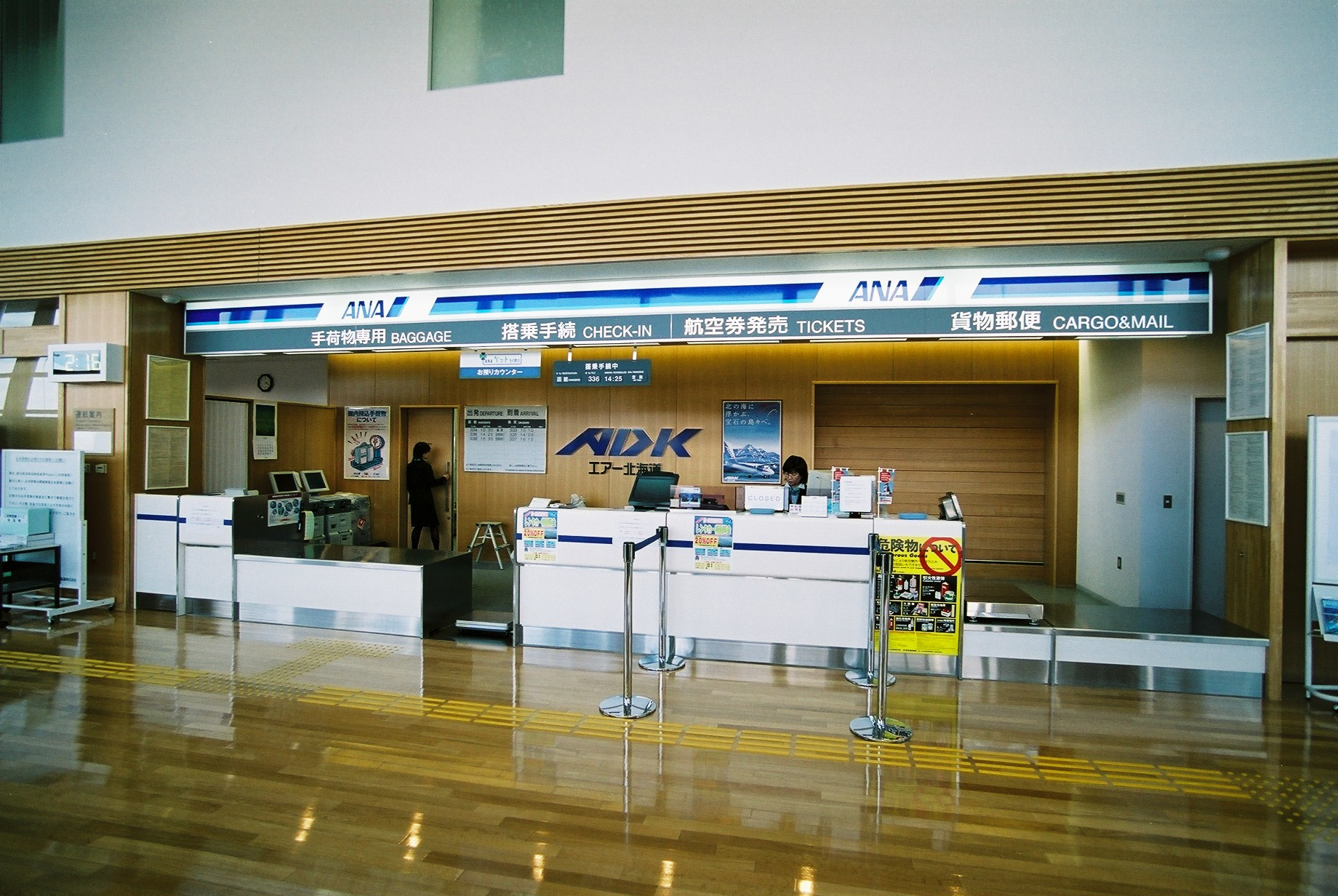
Check-in counters (2006)
