= Okadama Airport =

Regional airport in Sapporo, Hokkaido, Japan

Sapporo Airfield Okadama Airport 札幌飛行場 Sapporo Hikōjo 丘珠空港 Okadama Kūkō
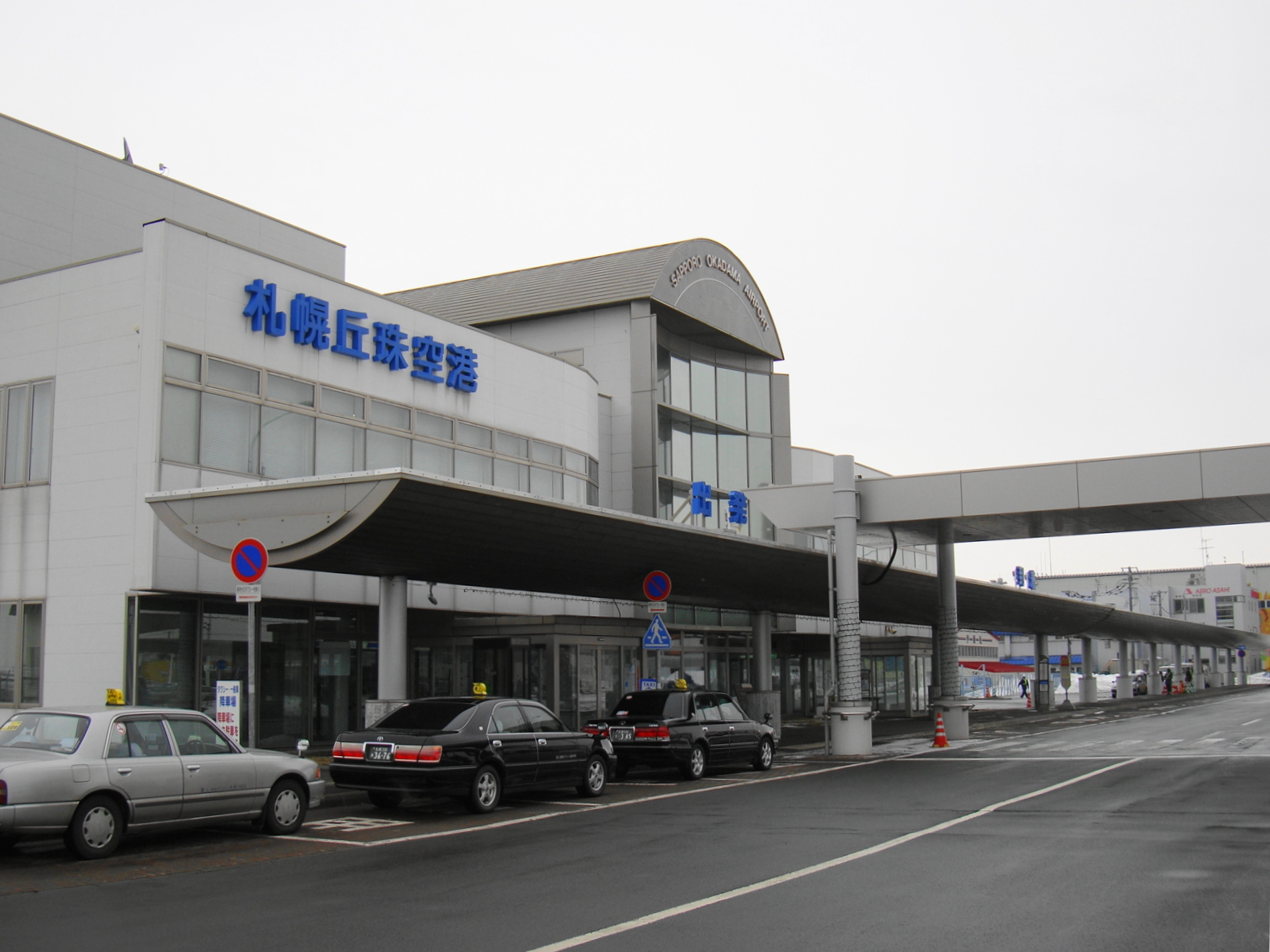
- IATA: OKD; ICAO: RJCO

Summary
- Airport type: Public / Dual-use
- Owner: Ministry of Defense
- Operator: Japan Ground Self-Defense Force
- Serves: Sapporo
- Location: Higashi-ku, Sapporo
- Opened: 1944
- Hub for: Hokkaido Air System
- Elevation AMSL: 26 ft (7.9 m)
- Coordinates: 43°07′03″N 141°22′53″E
- Website: www.okadama-airport.co.jp/eng/index.html

Map
- Location in Hokkaidō Location in Japan

Runways
| Direction | Length | | Surface |
| Direction | m | ft | Surface |
|---|---|---|---|
| 14/32 | 1,500 | 4,921 | Asphalt |

Statistics (2015)
- Passengers: 175,846
- Cargo (metric tonnes): 4
- Aircraft movement: 15,397
- Source: Japanese Ministry of Land, Infrastructure, Transport and Tourism

Sapporo Airfield (Japanese: 札幌飛行場, Hepburn: Sapporo Hikōjo) (IATA: OKD, ICAO: RJCO), commonly known as Okadama Airport (Japanese: 丘珠空港, Hepburn: Okadama Kūkō), is a dual-use airport located in Okadama-chō, Higashi-ku, Sapporo, Hokkaido, 4 NM (7.4 km; 4.6 mi) north of the city center of Sapporo. Its scheduled airline service is limited to turboprop flights to other cities in Hokkaido; larger aircraft use New Chitose Airport, 45 km (28 mi) south of the city. The airport is also used by Camp Okadama of the Japan Ground Self-Defense Force and by corporate and general aviation operators: an adjacent facility houses the air traffic control center for Hokkaido and the Tohoku region. The airport houses the headquarters of Hokkaido Air System.

== History ==
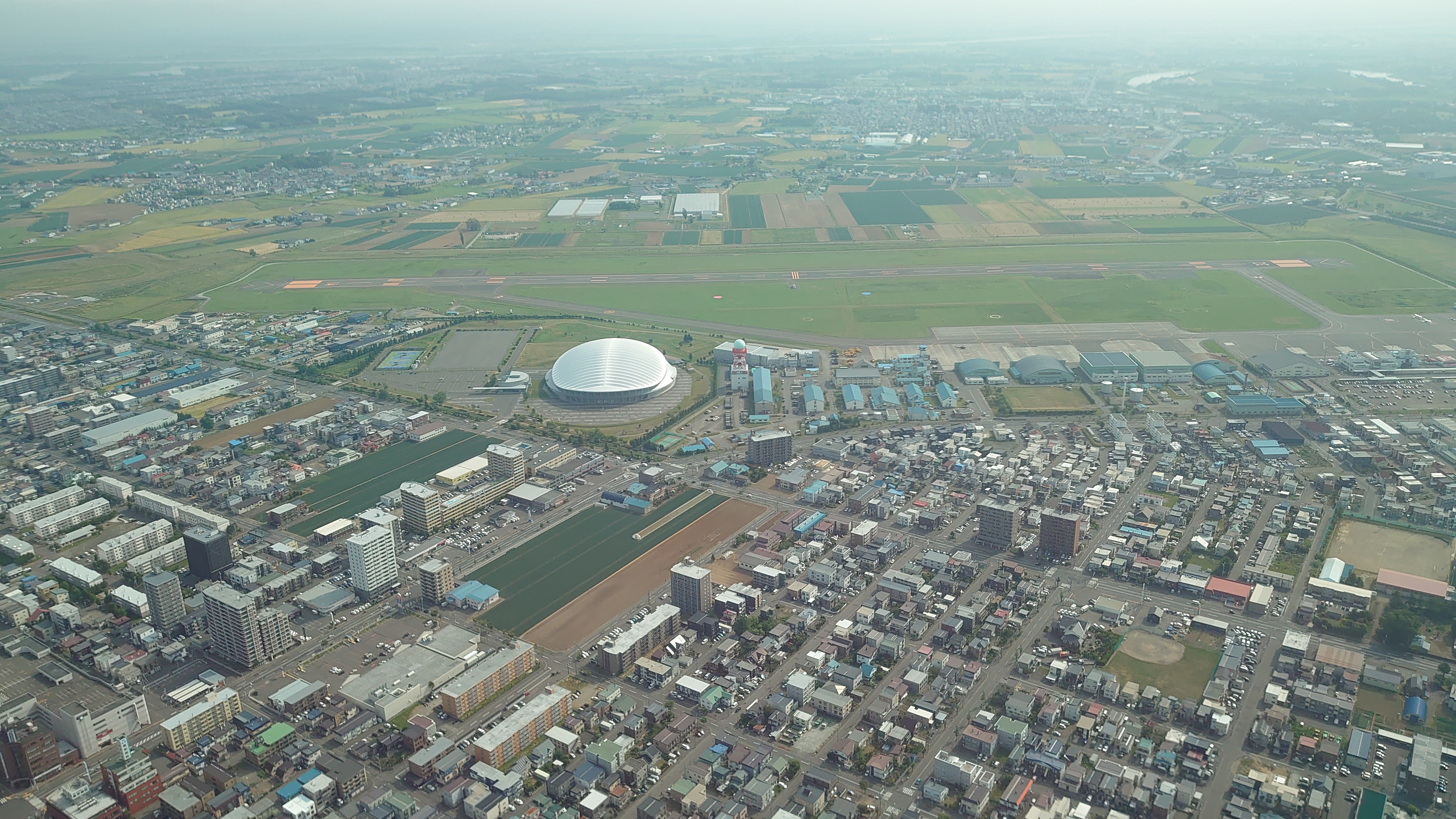
Sapporo Airfield in 2021

Okadama was constructed between 1942 and 1944 as an airfield for the Imperial Japanese Army. Following Japan's surrender to the United States in 1945, ending World War II, the United States Army Air Forces took over the airfield, using it as a training base until the end of the US occupation in 1952. Following the occupation, the field reverted to the Japan Self-Defense Forces.

Scheduled civilian passenger operations began in June 1956 when North Japan Airlines (later Japan Domestic Airlines, Toa Domestic Airlines and Japan Air System) began service to Memanbetsu. All Nippon Airways began service to Okadama in 1966. These airlines operated propeller service at the airport through the mid-1970s, chiefly using NAMC YS-11 turboprops. Although the airport's main runway was extended from 1,000 to 1,500 m in 1967, most scheduled traffic migrated to New Chitose Airport which was better equipped to handle larger jet aircraft. In 1974, Toa ceased operations at Okadama and ANA established a new subsidiary, Air Nippon, to handle YS-11 flights at the airport. ANA later replaced its YS-11s with quieter Bombardier Dash 8 turboprops.

In 1995, the city of Sapporo proposed extending the runway to 2,000 m in order to allow jet service at Okadama. This plan met protests from neighboring residents, and was abandoned in 1996. In 1998, local residents agreed to an extension of the runway to 1,500 m in exchange for a cap of 44 daily takeoffs and landings.

ANA, which accounted for 80% of passenger traffic at Okadama, ceased Okadama operations in 2010 and relocated its operations to the nearby and larger New Chitose Airport. This leaves JAL affiliate Hokkaido Air System as the airport's only scheduled carrier. The airport terminal (operated by a company 26% owned by the Sapporo government) operated at a slight profit until fiscal year 2009, but the departure of ANA group traffic drove its finances into a net loss. HAC continues to serve the airport using Saab 340 turboprops which have since been replaced by the ATR 42.

In November 2013, Fuji Dream Airlines operated a regional jet charter to Okadama from Komaki Airport in Nagoya, the first passenger jet service in the airport's history.

In July 2023, Sapporo City officially announced that it would extend the runway to 1,800 meters, with the understanding of local residents.

== Airlines and destinations ==
| Airlines | Destinations |
|---|---|
| Fuji Dream Airlines | Nagoya–Komaki |
| Hokkaido Air System | Akita, Hakodate, Kushiro, Memanbetsu, Misawa, Nakashibetsu, Okushiri, Rishiri |
| Toki Air | Nagoya–Centrair, Niigata |

== JGSDF units ==
- Northern Air Corps Headquarters (Beechcraft King Air 350)
- Northern Helicopter Corps (H-6, UH-1)
- No. 7 Division Airborne
- No. 11 Division Airborne

== Ground transportation ==
=== Buses ===
| Name | Via | Destination | Company | Note |
|---|---|---|---|---|
| Airport Bus | Sakaemachi Station (Hokkaido) | Sapporo Station | Hokuto Kotsu Bus | There isn't any service between Sapporo Station and Sakaemachi Station (Hokkaido) during winter due to increasing delay by snow． |
| 麻26 | Sakaemachi Station (Hokkaido) | Asabu Bus Terminal (Asabu Station・Shin-Kotoni Station) | Hokkaido Chuo Bus | |
| 麻26 | | Toyohatake | Hokkaido Chuo Bus | |
| 麻26 | Toyohatake | Moerenuma Park | Hokkaido Chuo Bus | Runs only during summer |

北37条東21丁目（旧・丘珠空港入口）- Kita 37-Jō Higashi 21-chome bus stop

It takes about 5 minutes on foot from Airport Terminal to this bus stop and the distance is about 200m.

| Name | Via | Destination | Company | Note |
|---|---|---|---|---|
| 栄21 | | Sakaemachi Station (Hokkaido) | Hokkaido Chuo Bus | |
| 栄21 | Shinoro Station | Shinoro 10-jō 4-chome | Hokkaido Chuo Bus | |

北36条東27丁目 – Kita 36-Jō Higashi 27-chome bus stop

It takes about 10 minutes on foot from Airport Terminal to this bus stop and distance is about 700m.

| Name | Via | Destination | Company | Note |
|---|---|---|---|---|
| ビ61 | Kanjō-Dōri-Higashi Station・Higashi-Kuyakusho-Mae Station | Sapporo Beer Museum (Naebo Station) | Hokkaido Chuo Bus | |
| 東61 | | Kanjō-Dōri-Higashi Station | Hokkaido Chuo Bus | |
| 東79 | | Kanjō-Dōri-Higashi Station | Hokkaido Chuo Bus | |
| 東76 | Shindō-Higashi Station | Kita-Sanjūyo-Jō Station | Hokkaido Chuo Bus | |
| 東61・ビ61・東76・東79 | Toyohatake | Moerenuma Park | Hokkaido Chuo Bus | Partly services are operated to Nakanuma Elementary School |

=== Trains ===
It takes 15 minutes on foot from the Airport Terminal to Sakaemachi Station on the Sapporo Municipal Subway Tōhō Line.
