= Air Do =

Japanese regional airline

AIRDO Co., Ltd. 株式会社エアドゥ Kabushiki-gaisha Ea Du

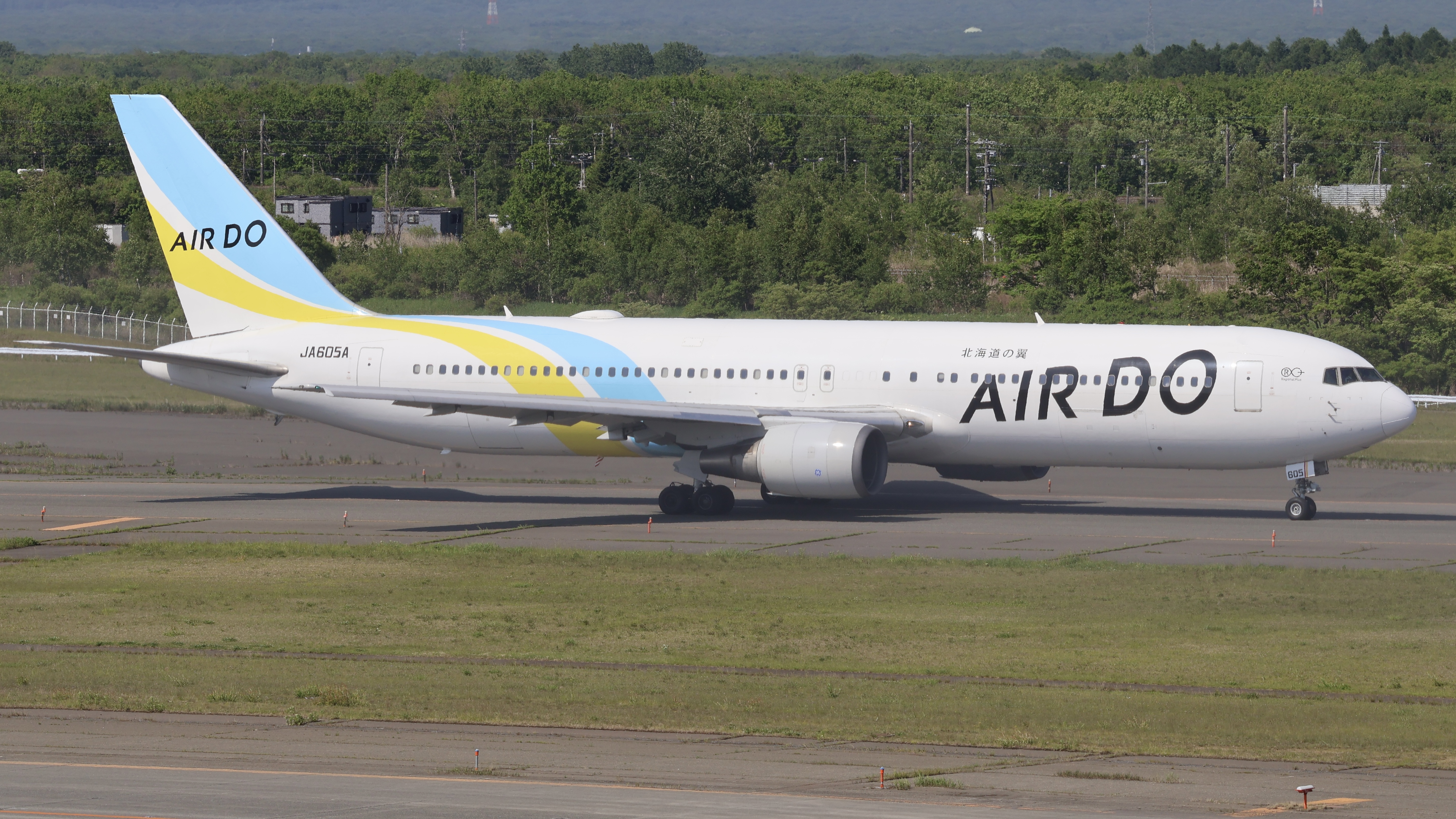
- An Air Do Boeing 767-300ER at New Chitose Airport
IATA	ICAO	Call sign
HD	ADO	AIR DO
- Founded: November 14, 1996; 29 years ago (as Hokkaido International Airlines); October 1, 2012; 13 years ago (as Air Do)
- Commenced operations: December 20, 1998; 27 years ago (as Hokkaido International Airlines)
- Operating bases: Sapporo–Chitose; Tokyo–Haneda
- Frequent-flyer program: My AIRDO
- Fleet size: 12
- Destinations: 10
- Parent company: RegionalPlus Wings Corp.
- Headquarters: Sapporo, Hokkaido, Japan
- Key people: Takahiro Suzuki (President & Representative Director)
- Revenue: ▼¥49 billion (FY 2014)
- Employees: 1,025 (April 1, 2020)
- Website: www.airdo.jp

Air Do is a Japanese regional airline headquartered in Sapporo, Japan. It operates scheduled service between the islands of Honshu and Hokkaido in cooperation with All Nippon Airways, from its hubs at New Chitose Airport in Sapporo and Haneda Airport in Tokyo.

== History ==
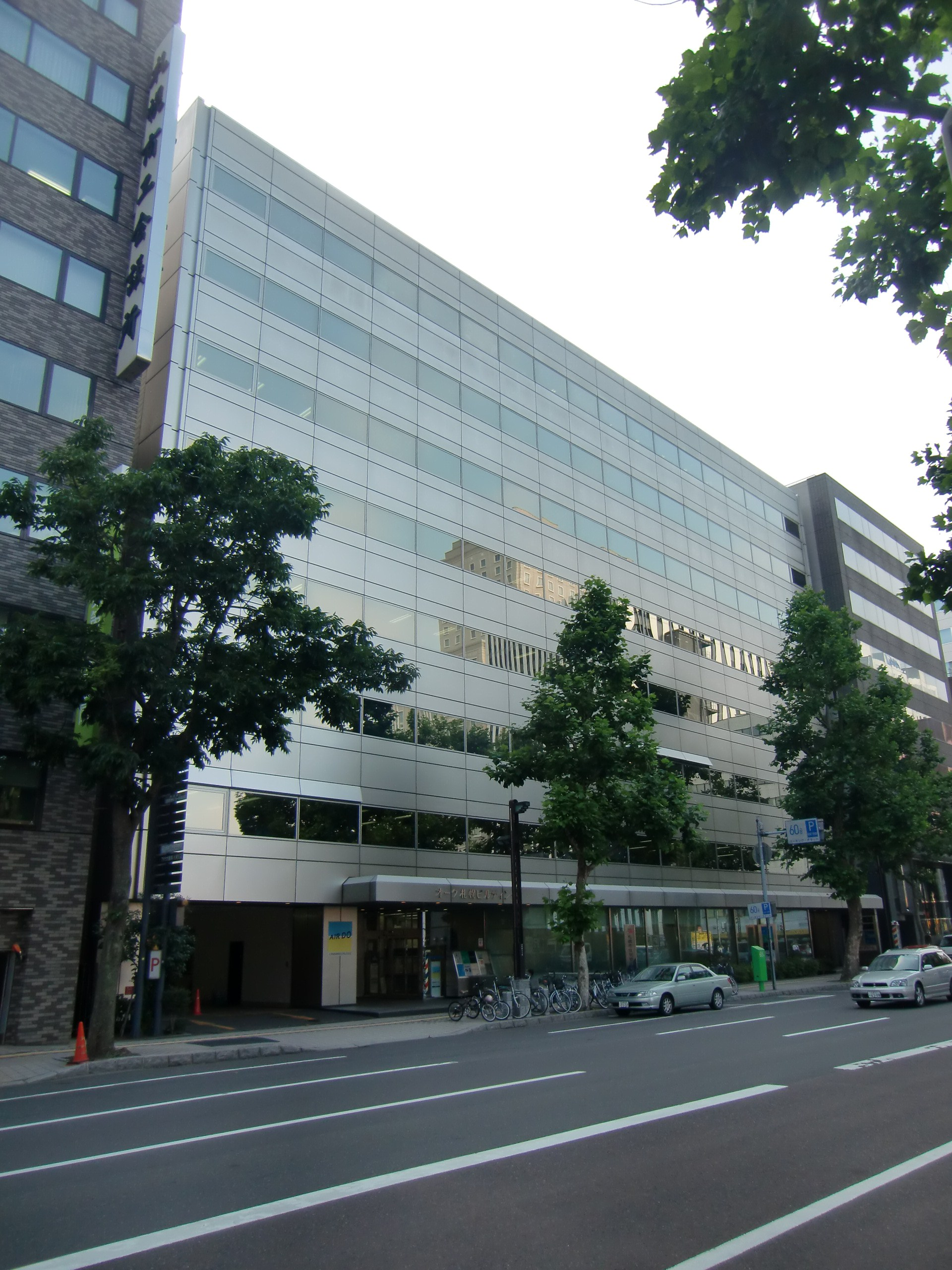
The Oak Sapporo Building in Sapporo, the site of the airline's headquarters

The airline was founded as Hokkaido International Airlines (北海道国際航空株式会社, Hokkaidō Kokusai Kōkū Kabushiki-gaisha) in 1996 by Teruo Hamada (浜田輝男, Hamada Teruo), an entrepreneur in Hokkaido, shortly after the Japanese government approved a domestic airline deregulation policy that would allow carriers to freely set fares on domestic routes. Hamada gathered investments from 29 other individuals who were interested in establishing a low-cost airline to compete with Japan's major domestic carriers (All Nippon Airways, Japan Airlines, and Japan Air System) on flights between Hokkaido cities and Tokyo. Additional capital was raised from Kyocera, Tokio Marine & Fire Insurance, Hokkaido Electric Power Company and other institutional investors, as well as from Hokkaido local governments seeking less expensive air service to Tokyo.

The company started flight operations on the Tokyo-Sapporo route, using the Air Do brand, in December 1998. Its first CEO was the former Japan-based manager of Virgin Atlantic. Maintenance and ground handling services were outsourced to Japan Airlines. Air Do enjoyed very high load factors during its first few months of operation, as its fares were 60% to 70% of the walk-up fares offered by established airlines.

However, other airlines quickly adopted their own discounted advance purchase fares in the wake of Air Do's initial success, driving load factors down to around 50%. In 2000, the Hokkaido prefectural government injected more capital and installed one of its senior officials as head of the company. After being significantly impacted financially in the aftermath of the September 11, 2001 attacks, and being denied additional financing from the Hokkaido prefectural government, Air Do entered Japanese corporate restructuring procedures in June 2002.

Air Do received new equity capital from a tokumei kumiai investment fund arranged by the Development Bank of Japan (DBJ), in which All Nippon Airways was a key investor. This began a number of business relationships between Air Do and ANA, including ANA codesharing on Air Do operated flights and Air Do leasing additional 767 and 737 aircraft from ANA. The fund was dissolved in September 2008 and DBJ, ANA and other investors became direct shareholders in Air Do.

On October 1, 2012, the company's legal name was changed from Hokkaido International Airlines Co., Ltd. to AIRDO Co., Ltd.

Air Do was sanctioned by the Japanese government in December 2014 for promoting a first officer to captain despite poor performance in training. Following the business improvement order, Air Do in January 2015 moved to eliminate its lowest-yielding routes to Niigata, Toyama, Fukushima and Komatsu.

In May 2021, Air Do and Solaseed Air announced their intentions to merge as a result of operating difficulties during the COVID-19 pandemic. In July 2021, Air Do shareholders approved a proposal to issue US$63.2 million of preferred shares to improve finances prior to the business integration. The new holding company for both airlines, RegionalPlus Wings, was officially established on October 3, 2022.

== Corporate affairs ==
The airline's headquarters are located in the Oak Sapporo Building (オーク札幌ビル, Ōku Sapporo Biru) in Chūō-ku, Sapporo.

The company's president is Susumu Kusano, who was appointed to the position on June 27, 2019.

== Destinations ==
Over its history, Air Do has operated scheduled services to the following destinations in Japan as of May 2021:

Region	City	Airport	Notes	Ref
Hokkaido	Asahikawa	Asahikawa Airport		
Hokkaido	Hakodate	Hakodate Airport		
Hokkaido	Kushiro	Kushiro Airport		
Hokkaido	Sapporo	New Chitose Airport	Hub	
Hokkaido	Obihiro	Tokachi–Obihiro Airport		
Hokkaido	Ōzora	Memanbetsu Airport		
Honshu	Fukushima	Fukushima Airport	Terminated	
Honshu	Hiroshima	Hiroshima Airport	Terminated	
Honshu	Kobe	Kobe Airport		
Honshu	Nagoya	Chubu Centrair International Airport		
Honshu	Okayama	Okayama Airport	Terminated	
Honshu	Sendai	Sendai Airport		
Honshu	Tokyo	Haneda Airport	Base	
Honshu	Toyama	Toyama Airport	Terminated	
Honshu	Komatsu	Komatsu Airport	Terminated	
Honshu	Niigata	Niigata Airport	Terminated	
Kyushu	Fukuoka	Fukuoka Airport		

In February 2020, Air Do operated an international charter flight to Taipei from Obihiro. This marks the first regional airline to serve international flights but it was ended.

=== Codeshare agreements ===
Air Do has a codeshare agreement with All Nippon Airways.

== Fleet ==
=== Current fleet ===
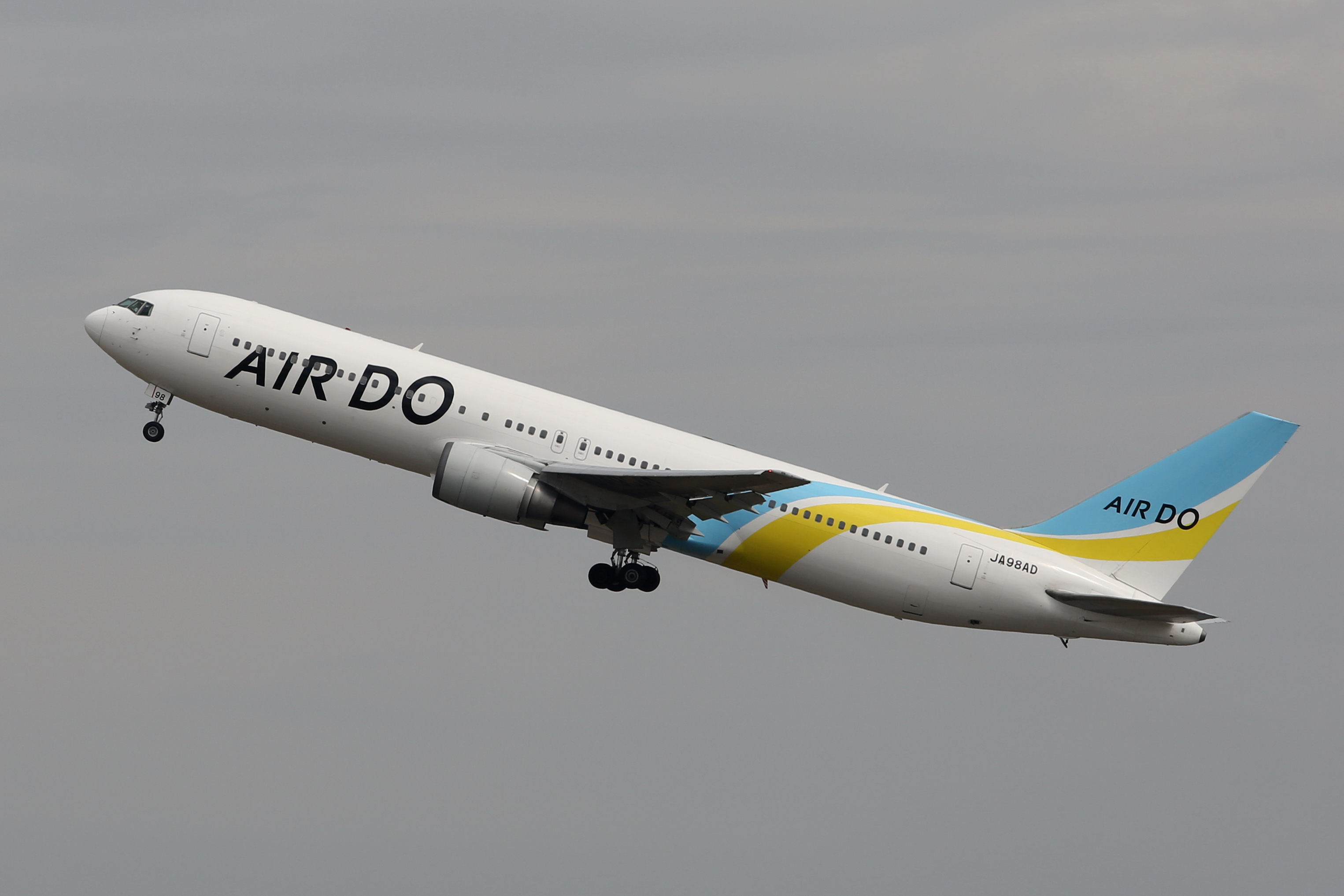
Air Do Boeing 767-300ER

As of July 2026, Air Do operates the following aircraft:

Air Do fleet
Aircraft	In service	Orders	Passengers	Notes
Boeing 737-700	8	—	144	
Boeing 767-300ER	4	—	288	
Total	12	—		

=== Former fleet ===
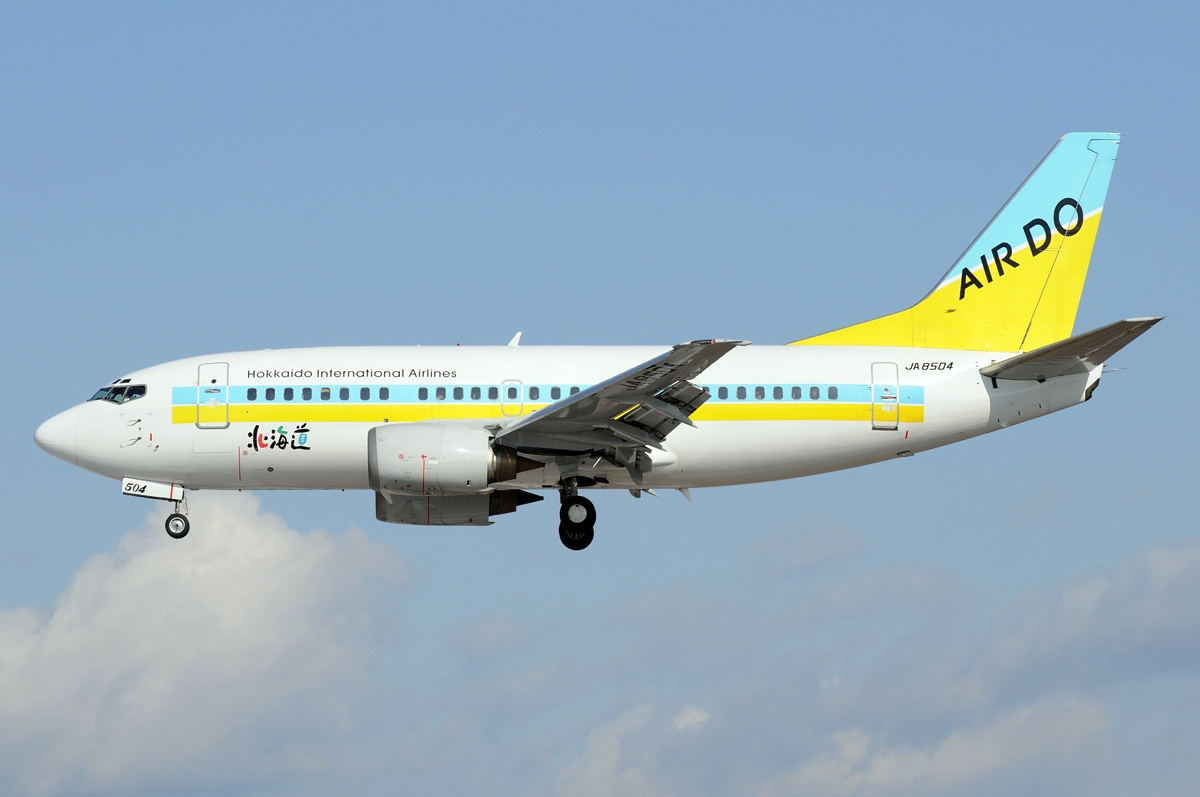
Former Air Do Boeing 737-500, in previous Hokkaido International Airlines livery (2010).

As of August 2025, Air Do operated 8 Boeing 737-700 and 4 Boeing 767-300ER.

Air Do and its predecessor Hokkaido International Airlines has previously operated the following aircraft types:

Air Do retired fleet
Aircraft	Total	Introduced	Retired	Notes
Boeing 737-400	2	2005	2009	
Boeing 737-500	7	2008	2016	
Boeing 767-200	1	2003	2005	
Boeing 767-300	4	2005	2022	

== Frequent-flyer program ==
Air Do operates a frequent-flyer program called My AIRDO. Points under the program are accrued based on the fare amount when purchasing tickets for travel with the airline, with registration to join the program available for Japanese residents.
