= Miyazaki Airport =

Airport in Miyazaki, Miyazaki Prefecture, Japan

Miyazaki Airport 宮崎空港
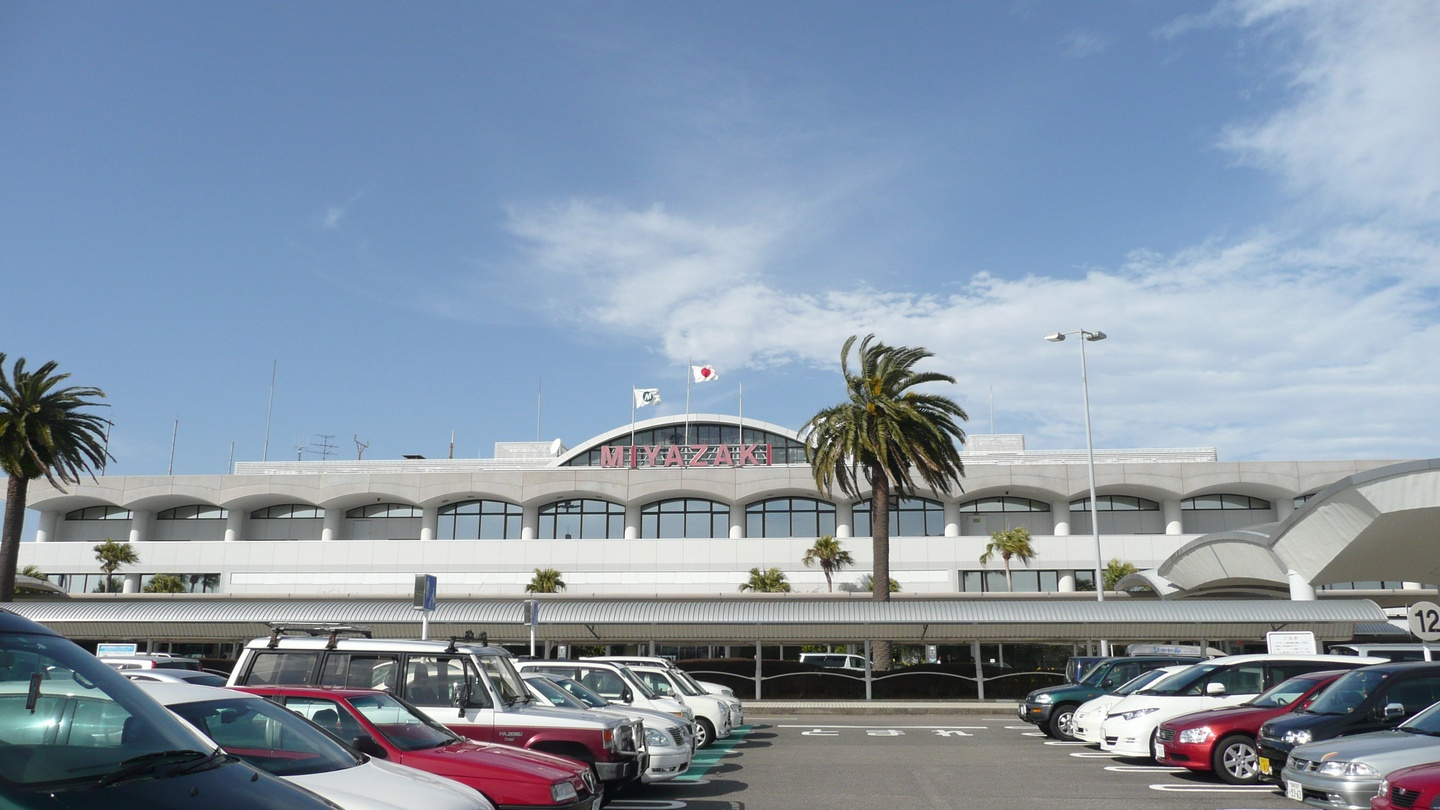

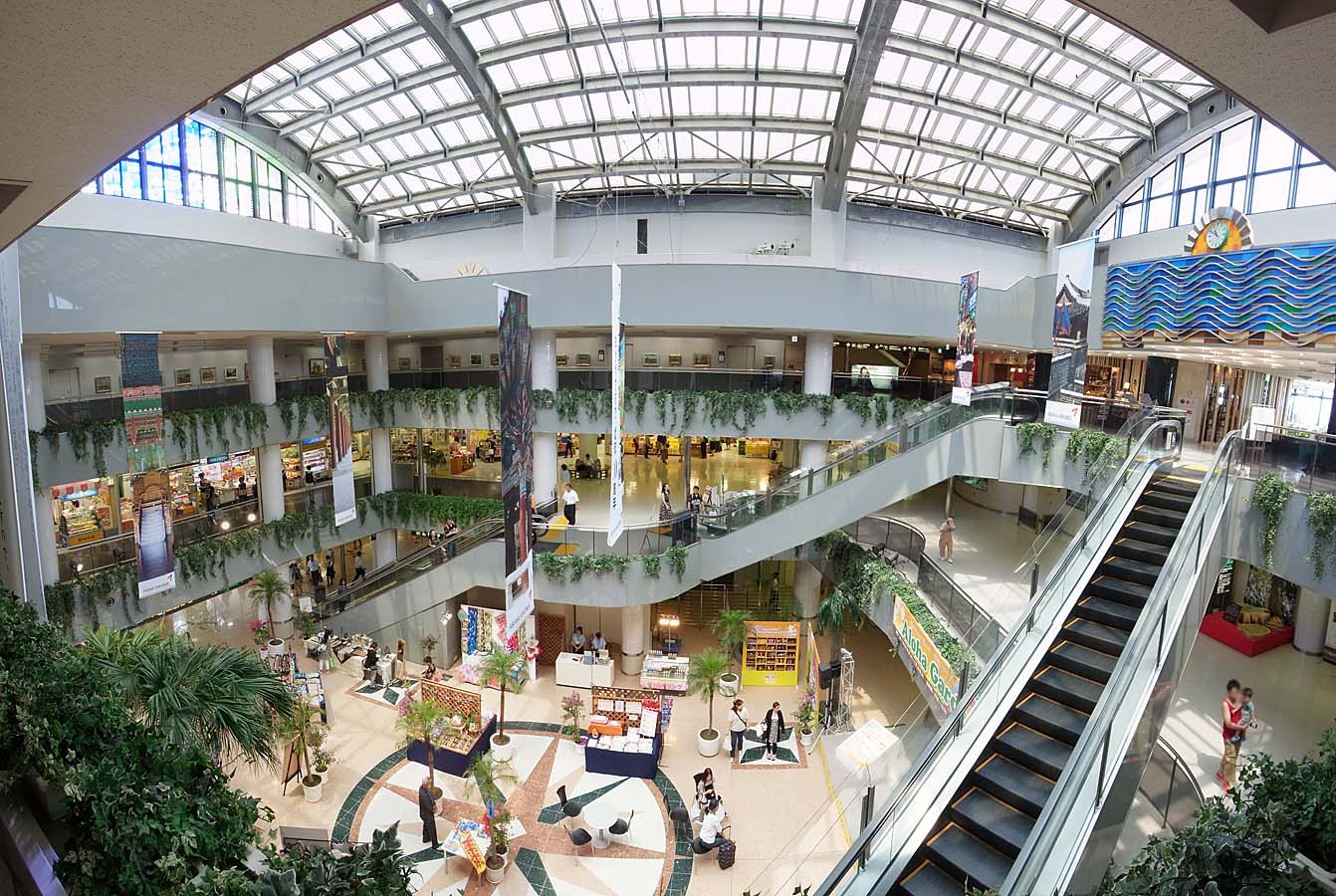
- IATA: KMI; ICAO: RJFM

Summary
- Airport type: Public
- Operator: Ministry of Land, Infrastructure, Transport and Tourism
- Serves: Miyazaki Prefecture, Japan
- Hub for: Solaseed Air
- Elevation AMSL: 19 ft (5.8 m)
- Coordinates: 31°52′38″N 131°26′55″E

Map
- Location in Miyazaki Prefecture Location in Japan

Runways
Direction	Length		Surface
Direction	m	ft	Surface
09/27	2,500	8,202	Asphalt concrete

Statistics (2024)
- Passengers: 3,116,019
- Cargo (metric tonnes): 5,814
- Aircraft movement: 18,422
- Source: Miyazaki Prefecture

Miyazaki Airport (宮崎空港, Miyazaki Kūkō) (IATA: KMI, ICAO: RJFM), affectionately known as Miyazaki Bougainvillea Airport, is an international airport located 3.2 km (2.0 mi) south-southeast of Miyazaki city, in Miyazaki Prefecture, Japan. The second floor has the head office of Solaseed Air.

== History ==
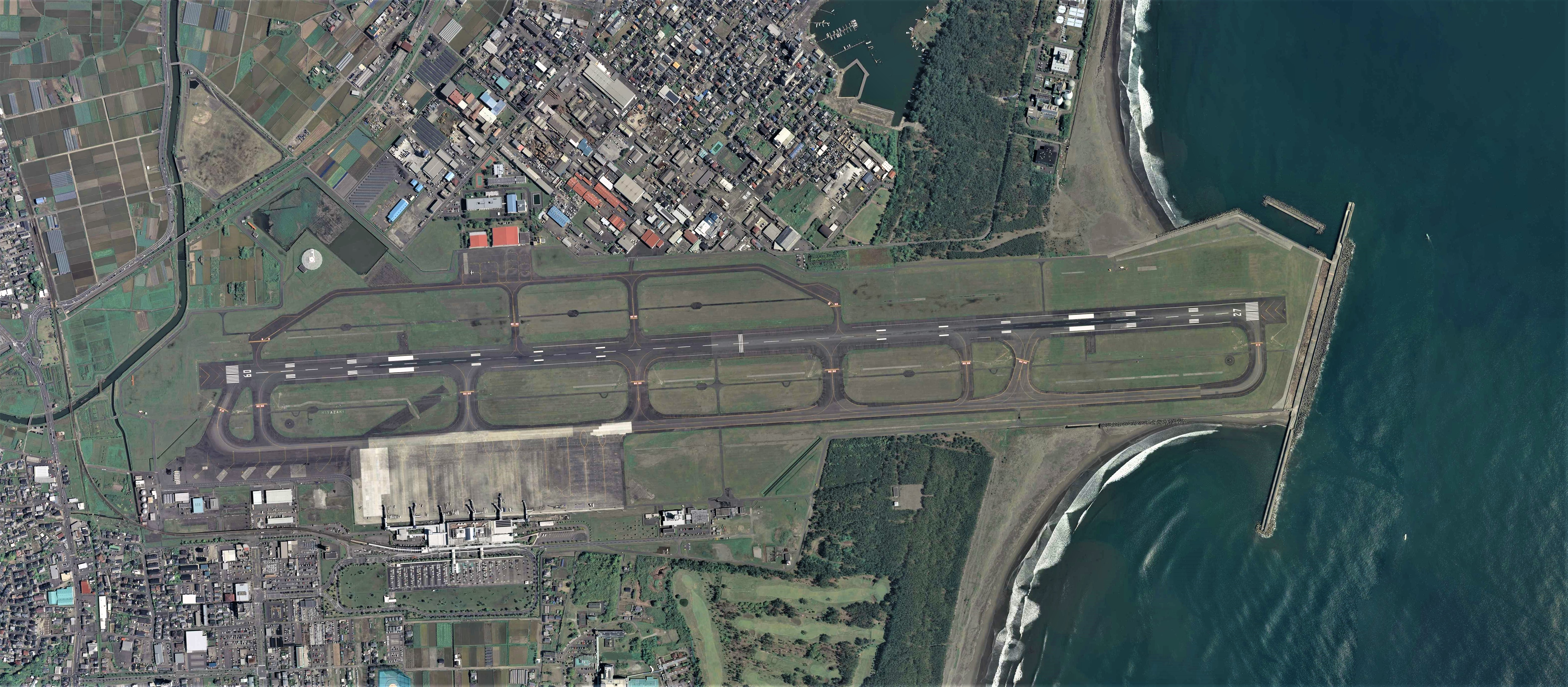
Aerial view of Miyazaki Airport in 2017.

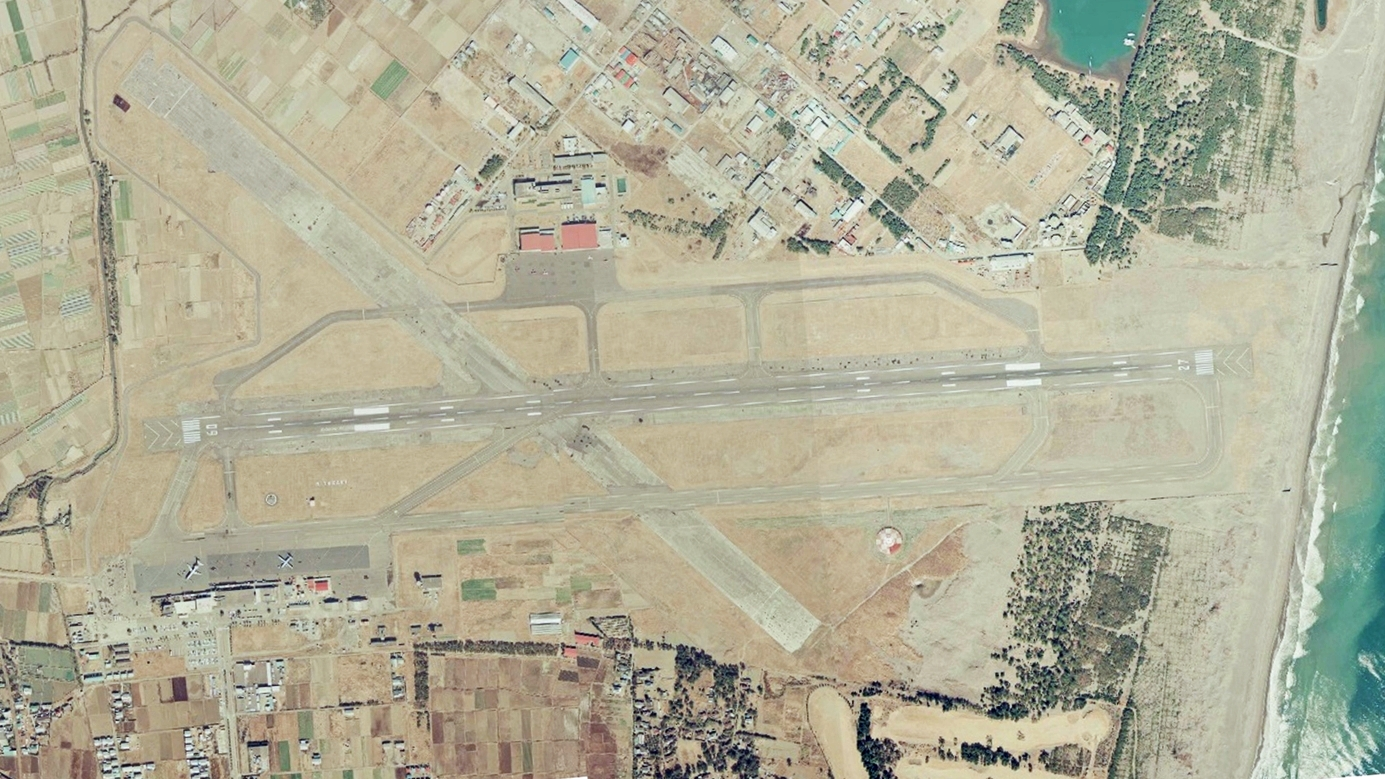
Aerial view of Miyazaki Airport in 1975.

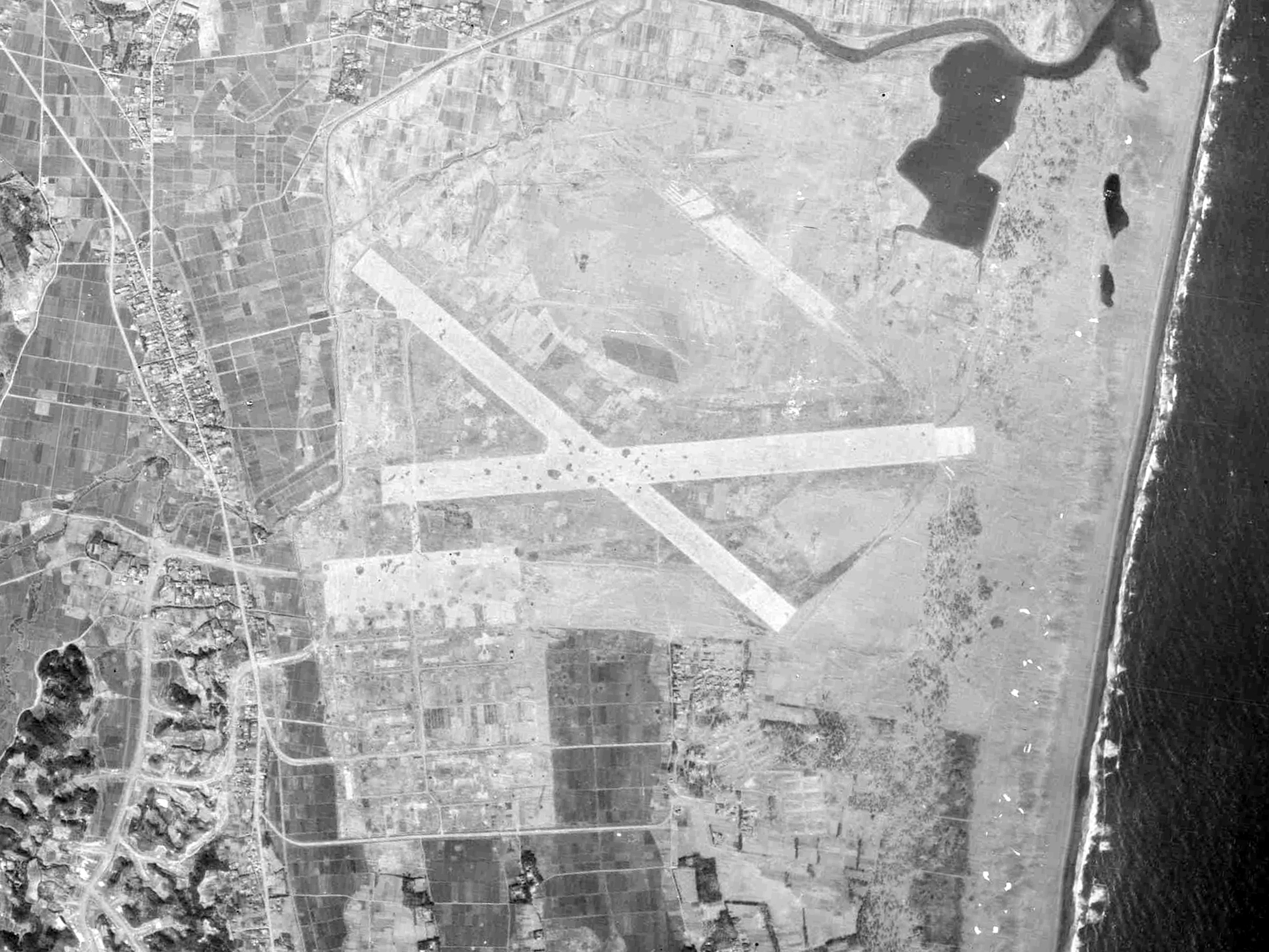
Aerial view of Miyazaki Airport in 1947 when it was an air base.

The airport opened in 1943 as an Imperial Japanese Navy base during World War II, and was a major base for kamikaze units beginning in February 1945, sending a total of 47 aircraft on suicide missions during operations such as the Battle of Okinawa.

== Airlines and destinations ==
Airlines	Destinations
All Nippon Airways	Osaka–Itami, Tokyo–Haneda
ANA Wings	Nagoya–Centrair, Osaka–Itami
Asiana Airlines	Seoul–Incheon
J-Air	Fukuoka, Osaka–Itami
Japan Airlines	Tokyo–Haneda
Jetstar Japan	Tokyo–Narita
Oriental Air Bridge	Fukuoka
Peach Aviation	Osaka–Kansai, Tokyo–Narita
Solaseed Air	Nagoya–Centrair, Naha, Tokyo–Haneda
Tigerair Taiwan	Taipei–Taoyuan

== Access ==
The airport is connected to various locations by bus and taxi. There is also a railway line, the Miyazaki Kūkō Line, which connects the airport with the city center of Miyazaki and northern cities of the prefecture.

== Accidents and incidents ==
- On 10 October 1969, All Nippon Airways Flight 104 overran the runway. All four crew and 49 passengers survived.
- On 2 October 2024, a bomb that was dropped by US Forces during World War II exploded under a taxiway, damaging the surface and causing the cancellation of more than 80 flights.
