= Tokachi–Obihiro Airport =

Civilian airport in Obihiro, Hokkaido, Japan

Obihiro Airport 帯広空港
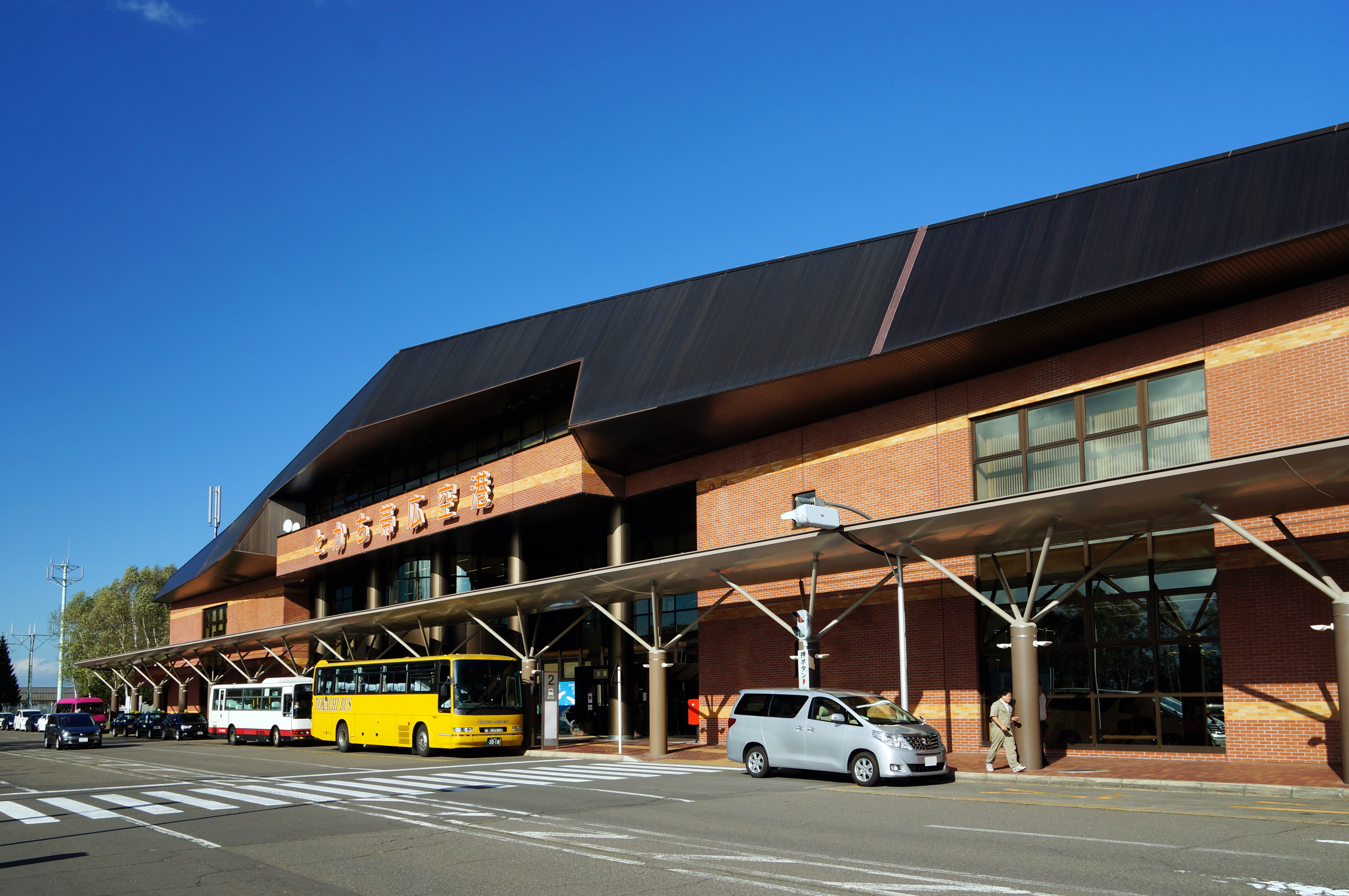
- IATA: OBO; ICAO: RJCB

Summary
- Airport type: Public
- Owner: Ministry of Land, Infrastructure, Transport and Tourism
- Operator: Hokkaido Airports
- Location: Obihiro, Hokkaido, Japan
- Opened: March 1981; 45 years ago
- Elevation AMSL: 490 ft (150 m)
- Coordinates: 42°44′00″N 143°13′02″E
- Website: www.hokkaido-airports.com/en/obihiro

Map
- Location in Japan 42°44′00″N 143°13′02″E OBO/RJCB (Japan)

Runways
Direction	Length		Surface
Direction	m	ft	Surface
17/35	2,500	8,202	Asphalt

Statistics (2015)
- Passengers: 605,703
- Cargo (metric tonnes): 2,344
- Aircraft movement: 13,273
- Source: Japanese Ministry of Land, Infrastructure, Transport and Tourism

Obihiro Airport (帯広空港, Obihiro Kūkō) (IATA: OBO, ICAO: RJCB), nicknamed Tokachi-Obihiro Airport (とかち帯広空港, Tokachi-Obihiro Kūkō), is an airport located 13.5 NM (25.0 km; 15.5 mi) south of Obihiro Station in Obihiro, Hokkaido, Japan.

== History ==
The airport opened in March 1981, initially with a 2,000 m (6,562 ft) runway, taking over the role of the former Obihiro Airport, now Tokachi Airfield. The runway was extended to 2,500 m (8,202 ft) in November 1985.

== Airlines and destinations ==
Airlines	Destinations
Aero K	Seasonal: Cheongju
Air Do	Tokyo–Haneda
Japan Airlines	Tokyo–Haneda
