= Asahikawa Airport =

Airport in Higashikagura, Hokkaido, Japan

Asahikawa Airport 旭川空港

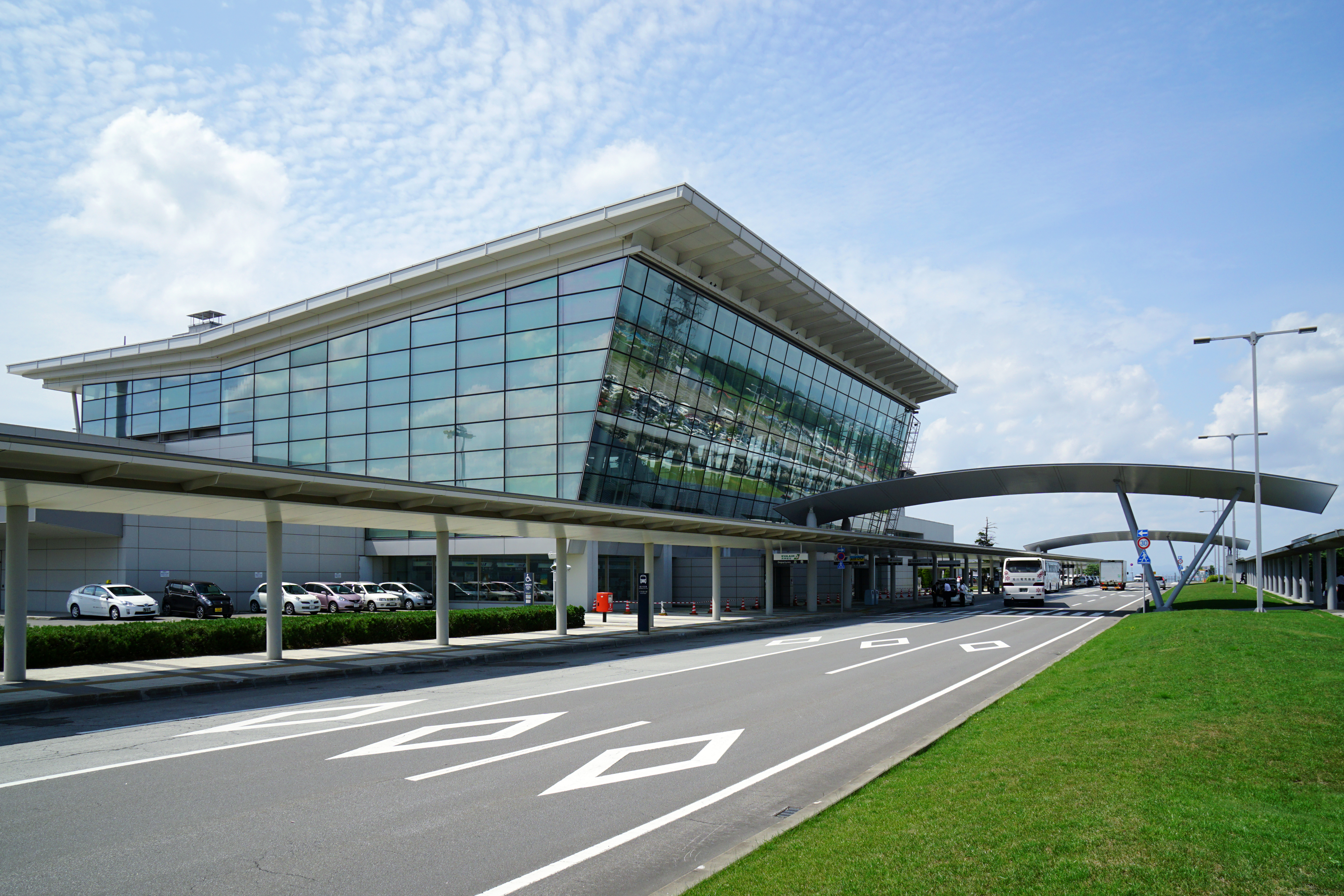
- IATA: AKJ; ICAO: RJEC

Summary
- Airport type: Public
- Owner: Ministry of Land, Infrastructure, Transport and Tourism
- Operator: Hokkaido Airports
- Serves: Asahikawa
- Location: Higashikagura, Hokkaidō, Japan
- Opened: July 1, 1966; 60 years ago
- Elevation AMSL: 690 ft (210 m)
- Coordinates: 43°40′15″N 142°26′51″E

Map
- Location in Hokkaidō Location in Japan

Runways
Direction	Length		Surface
Direction	m	ft	Surface
16/34	2,500	8,202	Asphalt

Statistics (2015)
- Passengers: 1,148,825
- Cargo (metric tonnes): 5,346
- Aircraft movement: 8,045
- Source: Japanese Ministry of Land, Infrastructure, Transport and Tourism

Asahikawa Airport (旭川空港, Asahikawa Kūkō) (IATA: AKJ, ICAO: RJEC), is a single-runway regional airport in Hokkaidō, Japan, straddling the cities of Asahikawa and Higashikagura.

== History ==
Planning of the airport began in the late 1950s. The site was chosen in November 1960 and received government approval in 1963. Japan Domestic Airlines began the first scheduled flight to Asahikawa on July 1, 1966, a NAMC YS-11 service to Haneda Airport via Okadama Airport. Scheduled service was seasonal (May through October) until 1970, when year-round flights to Tokyo began.

The airport was closed for expansion work from May 1981 until February 1982, during which time the main runway was extended and widened, from 1,200 x 30 m to 1,640 m x 45 m. A further extension to 2,000 m was completed in November 1982. Following these expansions, jet service began at the airport, beginning with DC-9 and the MD-80 narrow-body aircraft followed by wide-body Airbus A300s beginning in December 1983.

ANA operated the first international charter flight from Asahikawa in 1987. Another runway extension, to 2,500 m, was completed in 1997, and the parallel taxiway opened in 1998.

Hokkaido Air System operated intra-island flights from Asahikawa to Hakodate (1998 to 2013) and Kushiro (1998 to 2008).

Scheduled international service to Seoul began in 2006, using new international facilities in the airport terminal. Asiana Airlines operated this route intermittently until 2011, when international service at Asahikawa was suspended in the wake of the Tohoku earthquake and tsunami. Thereafter, TransAsia Airways served Taipei from 2012 to 2016, and EVA Air served the same route from 2013 to 2015. China Eastern Airlines began service to Beijing and Shanghai in 2014, but ended the Beijing route in 2016 and the Shanghai route in 2017. Tigerair Taiwan served the Taipei route from 2018 to 2020, and Korean Air served Seoul in the summer of 2019 with five flights per week.

In 2016, plans were finalized to build a new 5,700 m^{2} international terminal to the south of the existing terminal, with a target of 500,000 international passengers per year by 2030. The new terminal opened in November 2018. An international lounge opened in January 2019.

The operating rights to Asahikawa Airport, along with six other airports in Hokkaido, were acquired by Hokkaido Airports Co., Ltd. in January 2020. Later that year, the COVID-19 pandemic ended all international service at the airport and cut domestic traffic by 82%. Japan removed cross-boarder travel restrictions in April 2023, with international destinations resuming shortly after.

== Airlines and destinations ==
Airlines	Destinations
Air Do	Tokyo–Haneda
Japan Airlines	Tokyo–Haneda
Jetstar Japan	Tokyo–Narita
Tigerair Taiwan	Taipei–Taoyuan

== Access ==
Asahikawa Airport is accessible by bus from Asahikawa Station, Asahiyama Zoo, and Furano Station. From Asahikawa Station it is about 15 km (35 minutes by bus) while from Furano Station it is about 40 km (1 hour by bus).
