= Haneda Airport =

Major international airport serving Tokyo, Japan

Haneda Airport 羽田空港

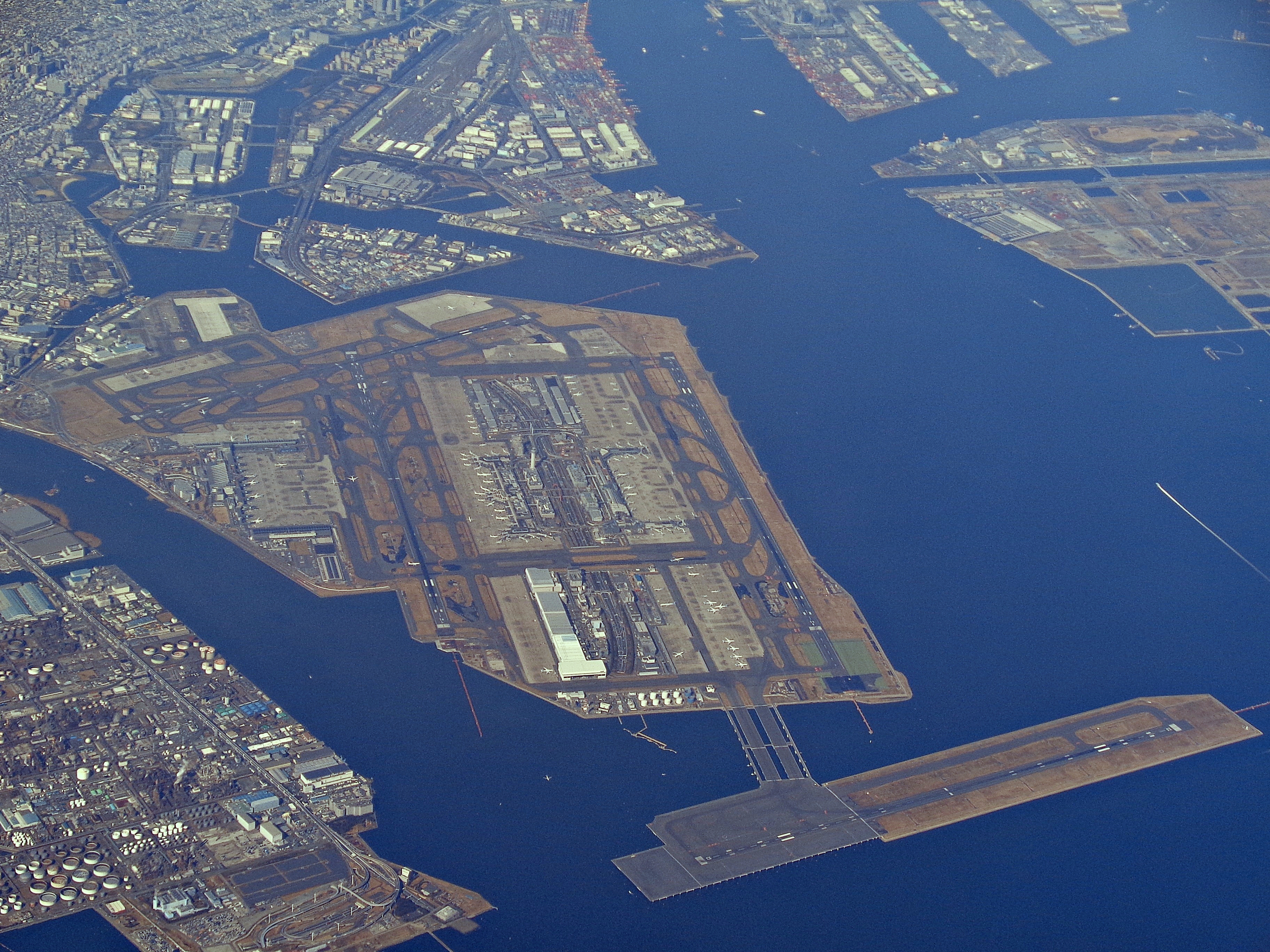
- IATA: HND; ICAO: RJTT; WMO: 47671

Summary
- Airport type: Public
- Owner/Operator: Ministry of Land, Infrastructure, Transport and Tourism
- Location: Ōta, Tokyo, Japan
- Opened: August 15, 1931; 95 years ago
- Hub for: All Nippon Airways; Japan Airlines
- Operating base for: Air Do; Skymark Airlines; Solaseed Air; StarFlyer
- Elevation AMSL: 6 m (20 ft)
- Coordinates: 35°33′12″N 139°46′52″E
- Public transit access: Keikyu Airport Line: Haneda Airport Terminal 1·2 Station Haneda Airport Terminal 3 Station: Tokyo Monorail: Haneda Airport Terminal 1 Station Haneda Airport Terminal 2 Station Haneda Airport Terminal 3 Station
- Website: tokyo-haneda.com

Maps
- Location in Japan HND/RJTT (Tokyo) HND/RJTT (Japan) HND/RJTT (Asia)
- Interactive map of Haneda Airport

Runways
Direction	Length		Surface
Direction	m	ft	Surface
16R/34L	3,000	9,843	Asphalt
16L/34R	3,360	11,024	Asphalt
04/22	2,500	8,202	Asphalt
05/23	2,500	8,202	Asphalt

Statistics (2024)
- Number of passengers: 85,906,170 ▲9.1%
- Rank (world): 3rd
- Aircraft movements: 426,500
- Cargo tonnage: 705,064 metric tonnes ▲25.1%

Haneda Airport (羽田空港, Haneda Kūkō; IATA: HND, ICAO: RJTT), officially Tokyo International Airport (東京国際空港, Tōkyō kokusai Kūkō) and sometimes abbreviated to Tokyo-Haneda, is a Japanese international airport, the busier of the two serving the Greater Tokyo Area, the other being Narita International Airport (NRT). It serves as the primary domestic base of Japan's two largest airlines, Japan Airlines (Terminal 1) and All Nippon Airways (Terminal 2), as well as RegionalPlus Wings Corp. (Air Do and Solaseed Air), Skymark Airlines, and StarFlyer. It is located in Ōta, Tokyo, 15 kilometers (9.3 mi) south of Tokyo Station. The facility covers 1,522 hectares (3,761 acres) of land.

Haneda previously carried the IATA airport code TYO, which is now used by airline reservation systems and travel agencies within the Greater Tokyo Area, and was the primary international airport serving Tokyo until 1978; from 1978 to 2010, Haneda handled almost all domestic flights to and from Tokyo as well as "scheduled charter" flights to a small number of major cities in East and Southeast Asia, while Narita handled the vast majority of international flights from further locations. In 2010, a dedicated international terminal, currently Terminal 3, was opened at Haneda in conjunction with the completion of a fourth runway, allowing long-haul flights to operate during nighttime. Haneda opened up to long-haul service during the daytime in March 2014, with carriers offering nonstop service to 25 cities in 17 countries. Since the resuming of international flights, airlines in Japan strategize Haneda as "Hub of Japan": providing connections between intercontinental flights with Japanese domestic flights, while envisioning Narita as the "Hub of Asia" between intercontinental destinations with Asian destinations.

The Japanese government encourages the use of Haneda for premium business routes and Narita for leisure routes and by low-cost carriers. However, the major full-service carriers may have a choice to fly to both airports. Haneda handled 87,098,683 passengers in 2018; by passenger throughput, it was the third-busiest airport in Asia and the fourth-busiest in the world. It returned to the second-busiest airport in Asia after Dubai International Airport in 2023 in the Airports Council International rankings. It can handle 90 million passengers per year following its expansion in 2018. With Haneda and Narita combined, Tokyo has the third-busiest city airport system in the world, after London and New York.

In 2020, Haneda was named the second-best airport after Singapore's Changi Airport and the World's Best Domestic Airport. It maintained its second place in Skytrax’s world's top 100 airports for 2021 and 2022, in-between Qatar's Hamad International Airport and Singapore's Changi Airport, and maintaining its best Domestic Airport title from the previous year.

== History ==
Before the construction of Haneda, the area was a prosperous resort centered around Anamori Inari Shrine, and Tokyo's primary airport was Tachikawa Airfield. It was the main operating base of Japan Air Transport, then the country's flag carrier. But as it was a military base and 35 kilometres (22 mi) away from central Tokyo, aviators in Tokyo used various beaches of Tokyo Bay as airstrips, including beaches near the current site of Haneda (Haneda was a town located on Tokyo Bay, which merged into the Tokyo ward of Kamata in 1932). In 1930, the Japanese postal ministry purchased a 53-hectare (130-acre) portion of reclaimed land from a private individual to construct an airport.

=== Empire era (1931–1945) ===
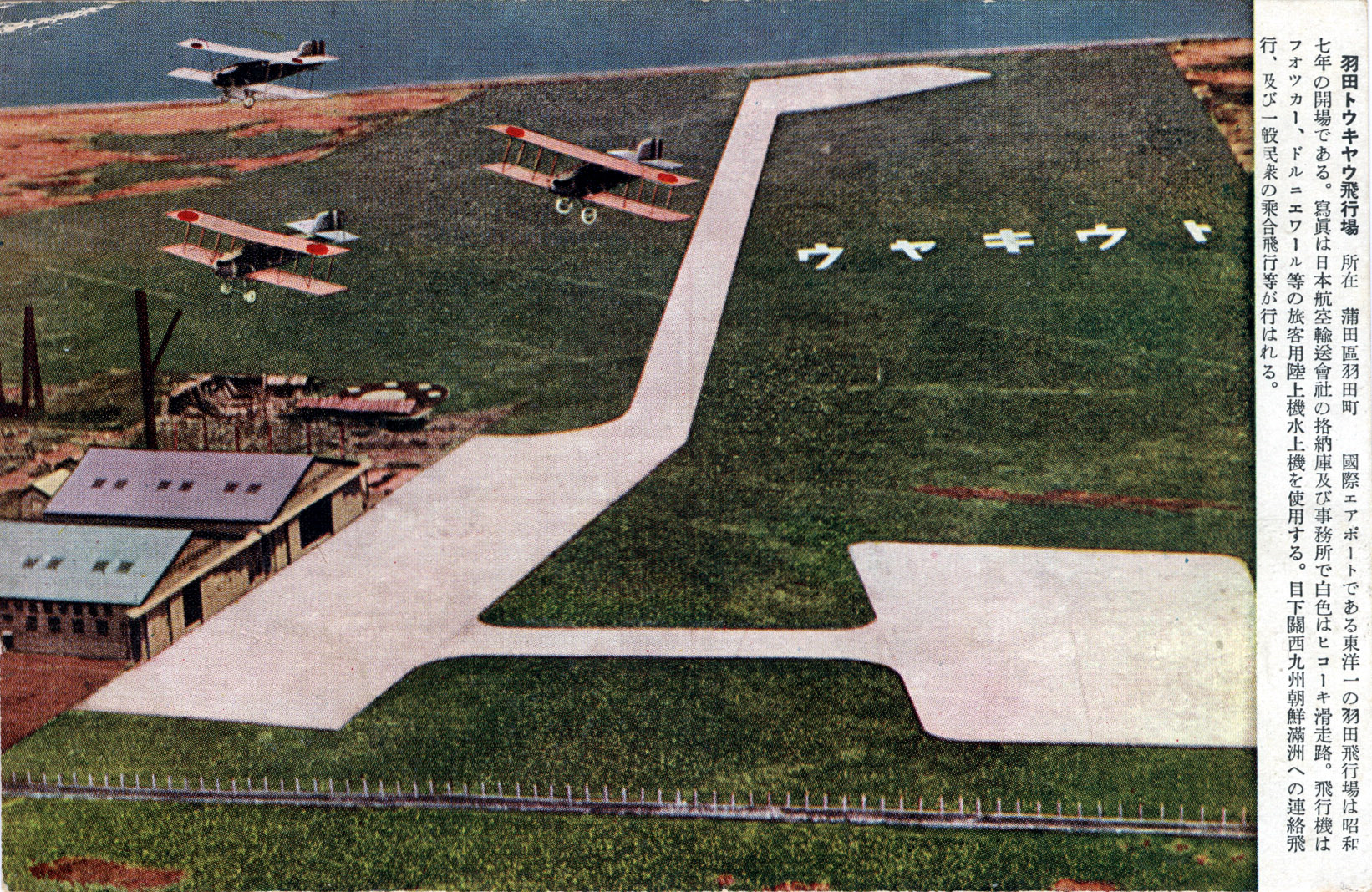
Apron and runway at Haneda Airfield c. 1930

Haneda Airfield (羽田飛行場, Haneda Hikōjō) first opened in 1931 on a small piece of reclaimed land at the west end of today's airport complex. A 300-metre (980 ft) concrete runway, a small airport terminal, and 2 hangars were constructed. The first flight from the airport on 25 August 1931, carried a load of insects to Dairen in the Kwantung Leased Territory (now part of China).

During the 1930s, Haneda handled flights to destinations in Japan mainland, Taiwan, Korea (both under Japanese rule) and Manchuria (ruled as the Japanese puppet state of Manchukuo). The major Japanese newspapers also built their first flight departments at Haneda during this time, and Manchukuo National Airways began service between Haneda and Hsingking, the capital of Manchukuo. JAT was renamed Imperial Japanese Airways following its nationalization in 1938. Passenger and freight traffic grew dramatically in these early years. In 1939, Haneda's first runway was extended to 800 metres (2,600 ft) in length, and a second 800-metre (2,600 ft) runway was completed. The airport's size grew to 72.8 hectares (180 acres) using land purchased by the postal ministry from a nearby exercise ground.

During World War II, both the IJA and Haneda Airport shifted to almost exclusively military transport services. Haneda Airport was also used by the Imperial Japanese Navy Air Service for flight training during the war.

In the late 1930s, the Tokyo government planned a new Tokyo Municipal Airport on an artificial island in Koto Ward. At 251 hectares (620 acres), the airport would have been five times the size of Haneda at the time, and significantly larger than Tempelhof Airport in Berlin, which was said to be the largest airport in the world at the time. The airport plan was finalized in 1938, and work on the island began in 1939, with completion scheduled for 1941. However, the project fell behind schedule due to resource constraints during World War II. This plan was officially abandoned following the war, as the Allied occupation authorities favored expanding Haneda rather than building a new airport; the island was later expanded by dumping garbage into the bay, and is now known as Yumenoshima.

=== Occupation era (1945–1952) ===
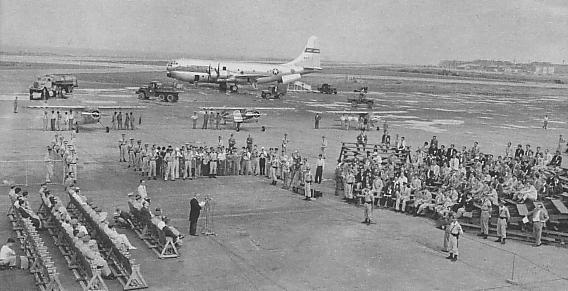
U.S. Air Force C-97 Stratofreighter at Haneda Army Air Base in 1952

On 12 September 1945, General Douglas MacArthur, Supreme Commander for the Allied Powers and head of the Occupation of Japan following World War II, ordered that Haneda be handed over to the occupation forces. On the following day, he took delivery of the airport, which was renamed Haneda Army Air Base, and ordered the eviction of many nearby residents to make room for various construction projects, including extending one runway to 1,650 metres (5,413 ft) and the other to 2,100 metres (6,890 ft). On the 21st, Anamori Inari Shrine and over 3,000 residents received orders to leave their homes within 48 hours. Many were resettled on the other side of a river in the Haneda district of Ota, surrounding Anamoriinari Station, and some still live in the area today. The expansion work commenced in October 1945 and was completed in June 1946, at which point the airport covered 257.4 hectares (636 acres). Haneda AAF was designated as a port of entry to Japan.

Haneda was mainly a military and civilian transportation base used by the U.S. Army and Air Force as a stopover for C-54 transport planes departing San Francisco, en route to the Far East and returning flights. Several C-54s, based at Haneda AFB, participated in the Berlin Blockade airlift. These planes were specially outfitted for hauling coal to German civilians. Many of these planes were decommissioned after their participation due to coal dust contamination. Several US Army or Air Force generals regularly parked their personal planes at Haneda while visiting Tokyo, including General Ennis Whitehead. During the Korean War, Haneda was the main regional base for United States Navy flight nurses, who evacuated patients from Korea to Haneda for treatment at military hospitals in Tokyo and Yokosuka. US military personnel based at Haneda were generally housed at the Washington Heights residential complex in central Tokyo (now Yoyogi Park).

Haneda Air Force Base received its first international passenger flights in 1947 when Northwest Orient Airlines began DC-4 flights across the North Pacific to the United States, and within Asia to China, South Korea, and the Philippines. Pan American World Airways made Haneda a stop on its "round the world" route later in 1947, with westbound DC-4 service to Shanghai, Hong Kong, Kolkata, Karachi, Damascus, Istanbul, London and New York, and eastbound Constellation service to Wake Island, Honolulu and San Francisco.

The U.S. military gave part of the base back to Japan in 1952; this portion became known as Tokyo International Airport. The US military maintained a base at Haneda until 1958, when the remainder of the property was returned to the Japanese government.

=== First international era (1952–1978) ===
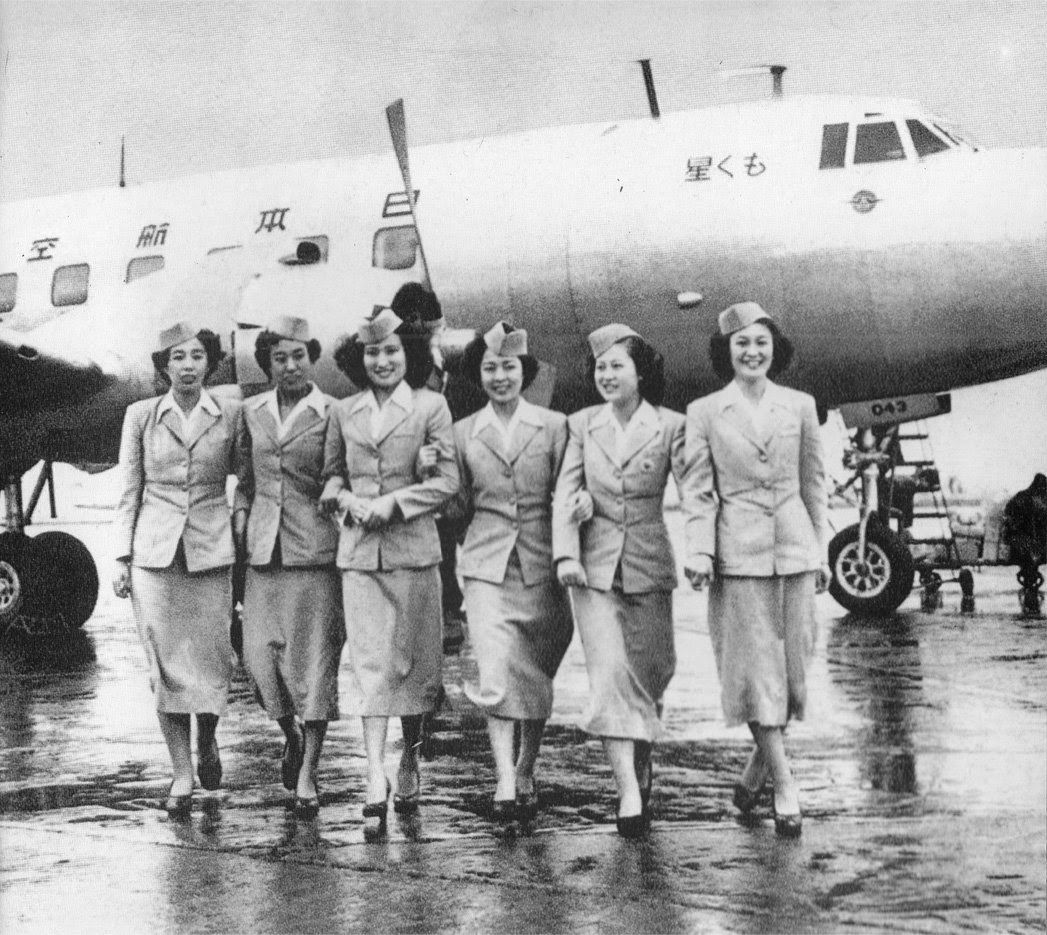
Japan Airlines flight attendants in 1951

Japan's flag carrier Japan Airlines began its first domestic operations from Haneda in 1951. For a few postwar years, Tokyo International Airport did not have a passenger terminal building. The Japan Airport Terminal Co., Ltd. TYO: 9706 was founded in 1953 to develop the first passenger terminal, which opened in 1955. An extension for international flights opened in 1963. European carriers began service to Haneda in the 1950s. Air France arrived at Haneda for the first time in November 1952. BOAC de Havilland Comet flights to London via the southern route began in 1953, and SAS DC-7 flights to Copenhagen via Anchorage began in 1957. JAL and Aeroflot began cooperative service from Haneda to Moscow in 1967. Pan Am and Northwest Orient used Haneda as a hub. The August 1957 Official Airline Guide shows 86 domestic and 8 international departures each week on Japan Air Lines. Other international departures per week: seven Civil Air Transport, three Thai DC4s, 2 Hong Kong Airways Viscounts (and maybe three DC-6Bs), two Air India, and one QANTAS. Northwest had 16 departures a week, Pan Am had 12, and Canadian Pacific had four; Air France had three, KLM had three, SAS had five, Swissair had two, and BOAC had three. As of 1966, the airport had three runways: 15L/33R (10,335 by 200 feet (3,150 m × 61 m)), 15R/33L (9,850 by 180 feet (3,002 m × 55 m)) and 4/22 (5,150 by 150 feet (1,570 m × 46 m)).

The Tokyo Monorail opened between Haneda and central Tokyo in 1964, in time for the Tokyo Olympics. In 1964, Japan lifted travel restrictions on its citizens, causing passenger traffic at the airport to swell. The introduction of jet aircraft in the 1960s, followed by the Boeing 747 in 1970 also required various facility improvements at Haneda, including extending Runway 4/22 over the water and repurposing part of Runway 15R/33L as an airport apron. A new international arrivals facility opened in June 1970.

Around 1961, the government began considering further expansion of Haneda with a third runway and additional apron space, but forecast that the expansion would only meet capacity requirements for about ten years following completion. In 1966, the government decided to build a new airport for international flights. In 1978, Narita Airport opened, taking over almost all international service in the Greater Tokyo Area, and Haneda became a domestic airport.

=== Domestic era (1978–2010) ===
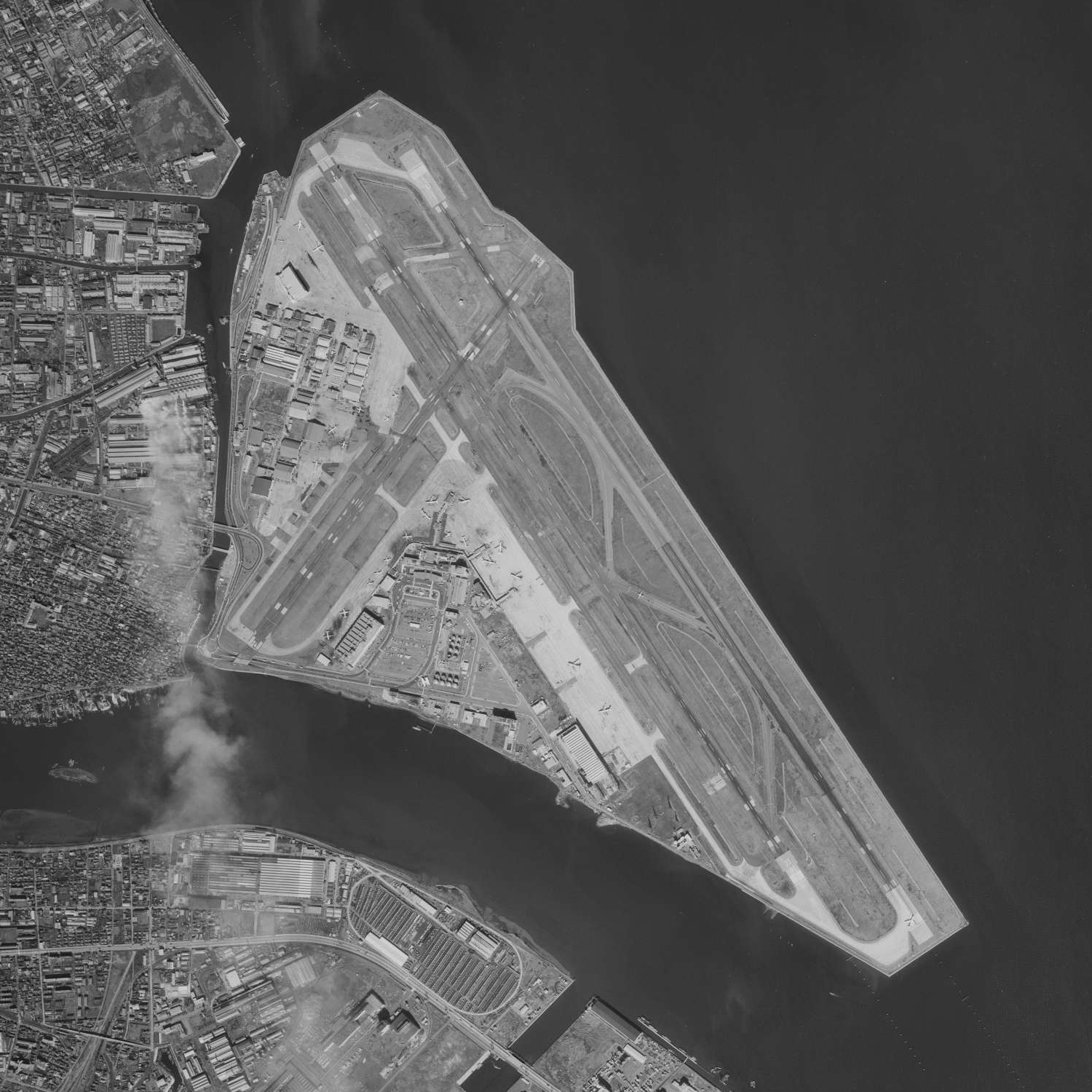
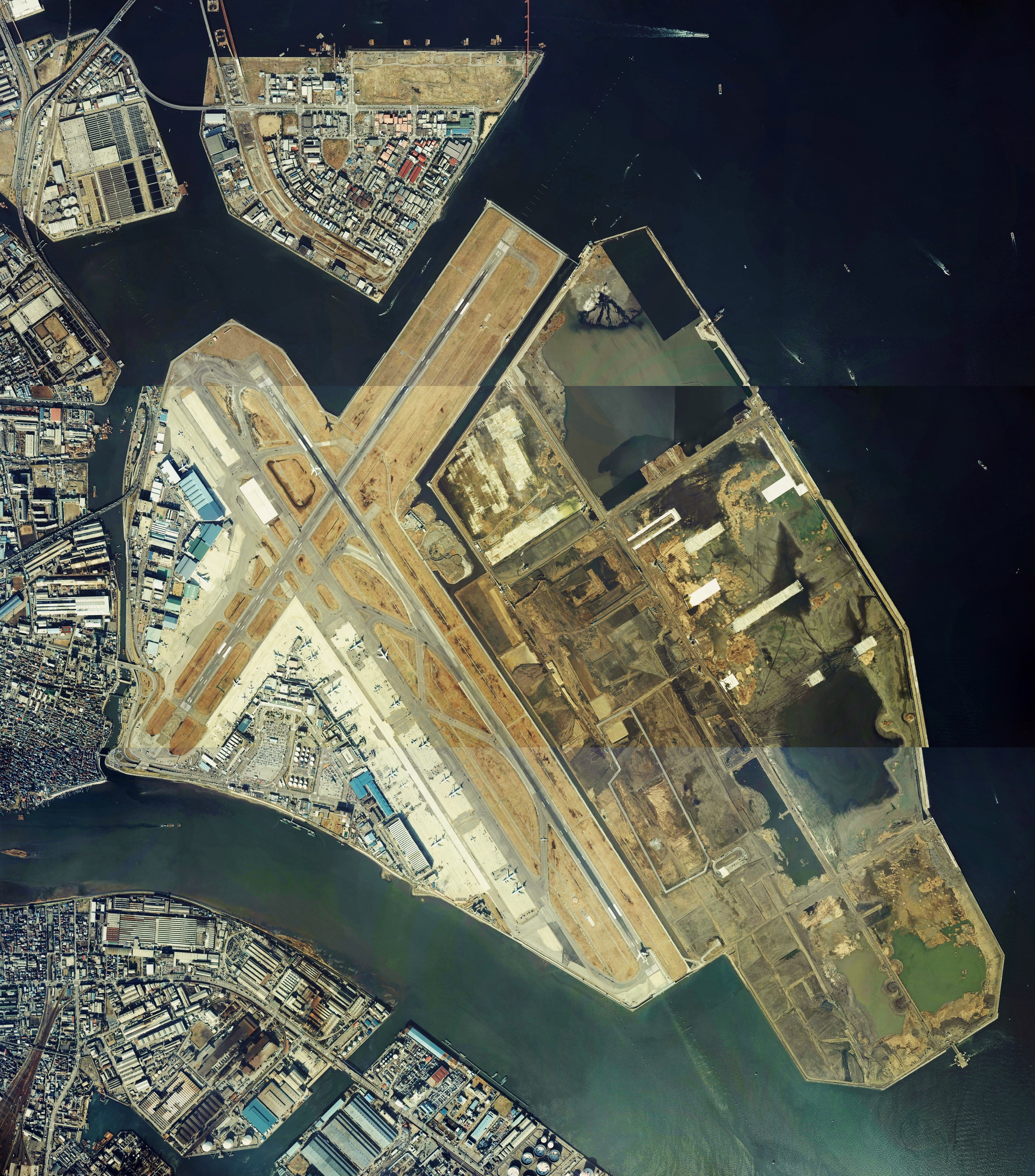
An aerial view of Haneda Airport in 1965 (left) and 1984 (right), showing reclamation work for runways 16R/34L and 16L/34R and Terminals 1 and 2

While most international flights moved from Haneda to Narita in 1978, airlines of the Republic of China (Taiwan) remained at Haneda Airport for many years due to the ongoing political conflict between Taiwan and the People's Republic of China (mainland China) and the danger of potential conflict when carriers of both nations cross paths at any Japanese airport. Taipei and Honolulu flights from Haneda were served by China Airlines and were the airport's only international routes until the early 2000s.

The Transport Ministry released an expansion plan for Haneda in 1983 under which it would be expanded onto a new landfill in Tokyo Bay to increase capacity, reduce noise, and make use of the large amount of garbage generated by Tokyo. In July 1988, a new 3,000-metre (9,800 ft) runway opened on the landfill. In September 1993, the old airport terminal was replaced by a new West Passenger Terminal, nicknamed "Big Bird", which was built farther out on the landfill. New runways 16L/34R (parallel) and 4/22 (cross) were completed in March 1997 and March 2000, respectively.

A new international terminal opened next to the domestic terminal in March 1998. Taiwan's second major airline, EVA Air, joined CAL at Haneda in 1999. All Taiwan flights were moved to Narita in 2002, and Haneda-Honolulu services ceased. In 2003, JAL, ANA, Korean Air and Asiana began service to Gimpo Airport in Seoul, providing a "scheduled charter" city-to-city service.

In 2004, Terminal 2 opened at Haneda for ANA and Air Do; the 1993 terminal, now known as Terminal 1, became the base for JAL, Skymark, and Skynet Asia Airways, and JAL expanded its footprint into the northern wing of the terminal.

In October 2006, Japanese Prime Minister Shinzo Abe and Chinese Premier Wen Jiabao reached an informal agreement to launch bilateral talks regarding an additional city-to-city service between Haneda and Shanghai Hongqiao International Airport. On 25 June 2007, the two governments concluded an agreement allowing for the Haneda-Hongqiao service to commence from October 2007. Since August 2015, Haneda also began flight services to Shanghai's other airport, Shanghai Pudong International Airport, which means Haneda served both Pudong and Hongqiao.

In December 2007, Japan and the People's Republic of China reached a basic agreement on opening charter services between Haneda and Beijing Nanyuan Airport. However, because of difficulties in negotiating with the Chinese military operators of Nanyuan, the first charter flights in August 2008 (coinciding with the 2008 Summer Olympics) used Beijing Capital International Airport instead, as did subsequent scheduled charters to Beijing.

In June 2007, Haneda gained the right to host international flights that depart between 8:30 pm and 11:00 pm and arrive between 6 am and 8:30 am. The airport allows departures and arrivals between 11 pm and 6 am, as Narita Airport is closed during these hours.

Macquarie Bank and Macquarie Airports owned a 19.9% stake in Japan Airport Terminal until 2009, when they sold their stake back to the company.

=== Second international era (2010–present) ===
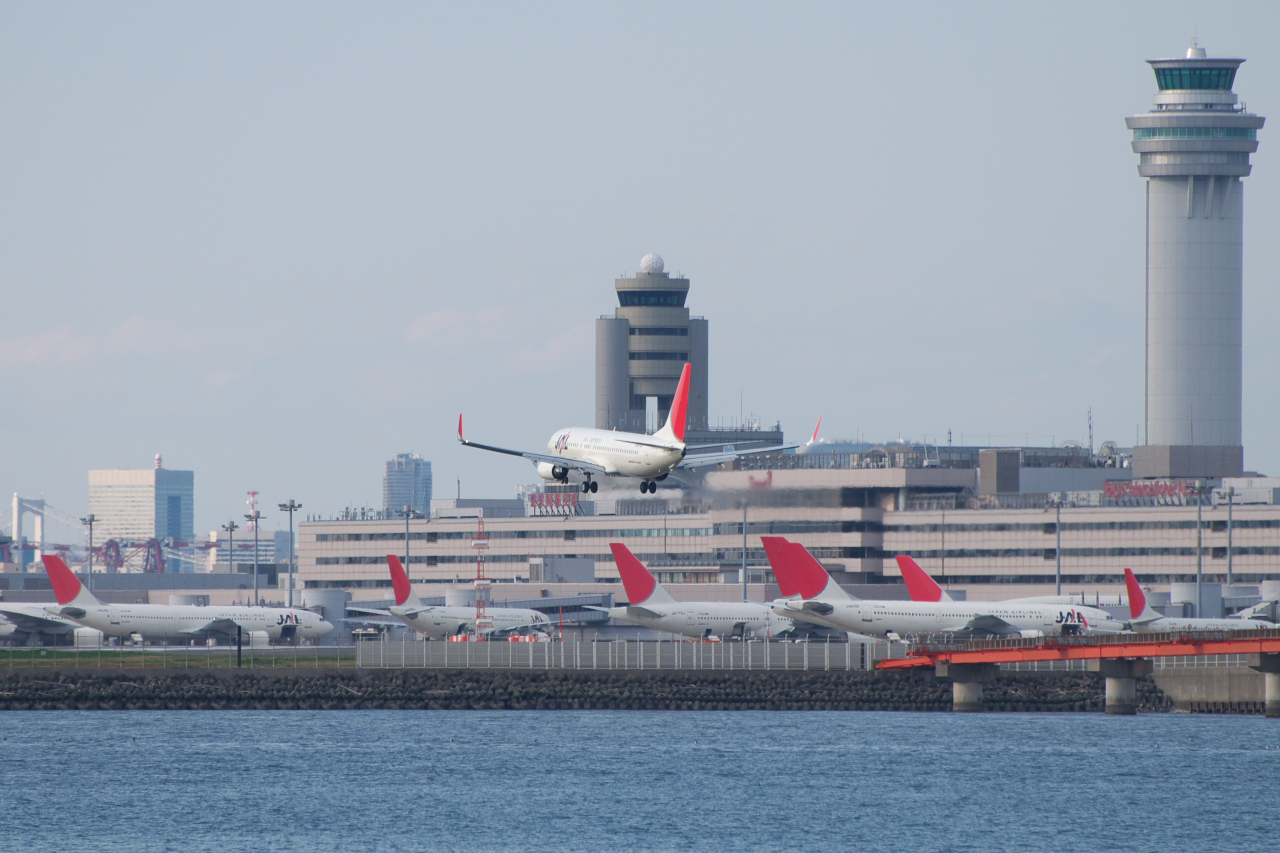
New air traffic control tower (right) and old tower (center)

A third terminal for international flights was completed in October 2010. The cost to construct the five-story terminal building and attached 2,300-car parking deck was covered by a private finance initiative process, revenues from duty-free concessions, and a facility use charge of ¥2,000 per passenger. Both the Tokyo Monorail and the Keikyū Airport Line added stops at the new terminal, and an international air cargo facility was constructed nearby. The fourth runway (05/23), which is called D Runway, was also completed in 2010, having been constructed via land reclamation to the south of the existing airfield. This runway was designed to increase Haneda's operational capacity from 285,000 movements to 407,000 movements per year, permitting increased frequencies on existing routes, as well as routes to new destinations. In particular, Haneda would offer additional slots to handle 60,000 overseas flights a year (30,000 during the day and 30,000 during late night and early morning hours).

In May 2008, the Japanese Ministry of Transport announced that international flights would be allowed between Haneda and any overseas destination, provided that such flights must operate between 11 pm and 7 am. The Ministry of Transport originally planned to allocate a number of the newly available landing slots to international flights of 1,947 kilometres (1,210 mi) or less (the distance to Ishigaki, the longest domestic flight operating from Haneda).

30,000 annual international slots became available upon the opening of the International Terminal, current Terminal 3, in October 2010, and were allocated to government authorities in several countries for further allocation to airlines. While service to Seoul, Taipei, Shanghai, and other regional destinations continued to be allowed during the day, long-haul services were initially limited to overnight hours. Many long-haul services from Haneda struggled, such as British Airways service to London (temporarily suspended and then restored on a less than daily basis before becoming a daily daytime service) and Air Canada service to Vancouver (announced but never commenced until Air Canada began a code share on ANA's Haneda-Vancouver flight). Delta Air Lines replaced its initial service to Detroit with service to Seattle before cancelling the service entirely in favor of the daytime services to Los Angeles and Minneapolis (although both the Detroit and the Seattle services have since resumed as daytime services). In October 2013, American Airlines announced the cancellation of its service between Haneda and New York JFK stating that it was "quite unprofitable" owing to the schedule constraints at Haneda; however, the airline resumed its service between Haneda and New York-JFK in 2024.

Haneda Airport's new International Terminal has received numerous complaints from passengers using it during night hours. One of the complaints is the lack of amenities available in the building, as most restaurants and shops are closed at night. Another complaint is that there is no affordable public transportation at night operating out of the terminals. The Keikyu Airport Line, Tokyo Monorail, and most bus operators stop running services out of Haneda by midnight, and so passengers landing at night are forced to go by car or taxi to their destination. A Haneda spokesperson said that they would work with transportation operators and the government to improve the situation.

Daytime international slots were allocated in October 2013. In the allocation among Japanese carriers, All Nippon Airways argued that it should receive more international slots than Japan Airlines due to JAL's recent government-supported bankruptcy restructuring, and ultimately won 11 daily slots to JAL's five. Nine more daytime slot pairs were allocated for service to the United States in February 2016. They were intended to be allocated along with the other daytime slots, but allocation talks were stalled in 2014, leading the Japanese government to release these slots for charter services to other countries. The new daytime slots led to increased flight capacity between Tokyo and many Asian markets, but did not have a major effect on capacity between Japan and Europe, as several carriers simply transferred flights from Narita to Haneda (most notably ANA and Lufthansa services to Germany, which almost entirely shifted to Haneda). In an effort to combat this effect, the Ministry of Land, Infrastructure and Transport gave non-binding guidance to airlines that any new route at Haneda should not lead to the discontinuation of a route at Narita, although it was possible for airlines to meet this requirement through cooperation with a code sharing partner (for instance, ANA moved its London flight to Haneda while maintaining a code share on Virgin Atlantic's Narita-London flight).

An expansion of the new international terminal was completed at the end of March 2014. The expansion includes a new 8-gate pier to the northwest of the existing terminal, an expansion of the adjacent apron with four new aircraft parking spots, a hotel inside the international terminal, and expanded check-in, customs/immigration/quarantine, and baggage claim areas. The Ministry of Land, Infrastructure and Transport constructed a new road tunnel between the Terminal 1/2 and Terminal 3 to shorten the connection time. Construction began in 2015 and concluded in 2020.

In addition to its international slot restrictions, Haneda remains subject to domestic slot restrictions; domestic slots are reallocated by MLIT every five years, and each slot is valued at 2–3 billion yen in annual income.

Haneda Innovation City, a new business hub, was built on the site of the old terminal near Tenkūbashi Station and opened on 16 November 2023.

== Facilities ==
Airport layout

Haneda has four runways, arranged in two parallel pairs. The airport's critical facilities, such as runways, taxiways, and aprons, are managed by the Ministry of Land, Infrastructure, Transport and Tourism. The Safety Promotion Center is a museum and educational center created and operated by Japan Airlines after the crash of JAL 123 in August 1985 to promote airline safety.

Due to the airport's position between Yokota Air Base and NAF Atsugi to the west, Narita International Airport to the east, and densely populated areas of Tokyo and Kanagawa to the immediate north and west, most Haneda flights arrive and depart using circular routes over Tokyo Bay. During north wind operations (60% of the time), aircraft arrive from the south on 34L and 34R and depart to the east from 34R and 05. During south wind operations (40% of the time), aircraft depart to the south from 16L and 16R, as well as 22 between 15:00 and 18:00, and arrive either on a high-angle approach from the north on 16L and 16R over west-central Tokyo (15:00 to 18:00 only) or from the east on 22 and 23 over Tokyo Bay (all other times).

Haneda Airport has three passenger terminals with 71 gates with jet bridges. An underground walkway connects terminals 1 and 2. A free inter-terminal shuttle bus connects all terminals on the landside. Terminal 1 and the domestic flight areas of Terminal 2 are only open from 5:00 am to 12:00 am. Terminal 3 and the international flight area of Terminal 2 are open 24 hours a day.

=== Terminal 1 ===
Terminal 1, nicknamed the "Big Bird", opened in 1993, replacing the smaller 1970 terminal complex, which was located where the current Terminal 3 stands. It is exclusively used for domestic flights within Japan and is served by Japan Airlines, Skymark Airlines, and StarFlyer's routes. The terminal has 29 gates with jet bridges, and is managed by Japan Airport Terminal Co., Ltd. (日本空港ビルディング株式会社, Nippon Kūkō Birudingu Kabushikigaisha).

The linear building features a six-story restaurant, shopping area, and conference rooms in its center section and a large rooftop observation deck with an open-air rooftop café. The terminal has gates 1 through 23 assigned for jet bridges and gates 31–40 and 84–90 assigned for ground boarding by bus. In September 2026, a north satellite terminal was completed, and it added six more gates that numbered 24 to 29 to alleviate the burden of bus transfers for passengers.

=== Terminal 2 ===
Terminal 2 opened on 1 December 2004. The construction of Terminal 2 was financed by levying a ¥170 (from 1 April 2011) passenger service facility charge on tickets, the first domestic Passenger Service Facilities Charge (PSFC) in Japan which had been increased to ¥290 in 2014 and ¥580 currently. The terminal is managed by Japan Airport Terminal Co., Ltd. (日本空港ビルディング株式会社, Nippon Kūkō Birudingu Kabushikigaisha).

Terminal 2 is served by All Nippon Airways, Air Do, and Solaseed Air for their domestic flights. On 29 March 2020, some international flights operated by All Nippon Airways were relocated to Terminal 2 after the addition of international departure halls and CIQ facilities (Customs, Immigration, Quarantine) in preparation for the 2020 Summer Olympics in Tokyo. However, the international departures and check-in hall was closed indefinitely on 11 April 2020, less than two weeks after its opening, due to the COVID-19 pandemic. International flights at Terminal 2 resumed from 19 July 2023 with the easing of COVID-19 restrictions and border controls.

The terminal has 27 gates with jet bridges, and features an open-air rooftop restaurant, a six-story shopping area with restaurants and the 387-room Haneda Excel Hotel Tokyu. The terminal has gates 51 through 73 assigned with jet bridges (gates 51 to 65 for domestic flights, gates 66 to 70 for domestic or international flights, gates 71 to 73 for international flights), gates 46–48 in satellite, and gates 500 through 511 (for domestic flights) and gates 700 through 702 (for international flights) assigned for ground boarding by bus.

=== Terminal 3 ===
Terminal 3, formerly known as the International Terminal, opened on 21 October 2010 (occupying the site of the former 1970 terminal complex), replacing the much smaller 1998 International Terminal adjacent to Terminal 2. The terminal serves most of the airport's international flights, except for some All Nippon Airways flights departing from Terminal 2. The first two long-haul flights were scheduled to depart after midnight on 31 October 2010, from the new terminal, but both flights departed ahead of schedule before midnight on 30 October. Terminal 3 is managed by Tokyo International Air Terminal Corporation (東京国際空港ターミナル株式会社, Tōkyō Kokusai Kūkō Tāminaru Kabushikigaisha).

Terminal 3 has 20 gates with jet bridges, and has airline lounges operated by oneworld members Japan Airlines & Cathay Pacific, Star Alliance member All Nippon Airways, and SkyTeam member Delta Air Lines.

Terminal 3 is also known for its Edo Ko-Ji market which recreate the Edo period, along with a replica of the Nihonbashi Bridge. The Haneda Airport Garden shopping complex which includes hotels and onsens is also connected to Terminal 3. All of these can be visited without a boarding pass since they are outside security.

The International Terminal was renamed to Terminal 3 on 14 March 2020, as Terminal 2 began handling some international flights operated by All Nippon Airways from 29 March 2020.

== Airlines and destinations ==
The following airlines operate scheduled passenger flights at Haneda Airport:

Airlines	Destinations
Air Canada	Toronto–Pearson
Air China	Beijing–Capital
Air Do	Asahikawa, Hakodate, Kushiro, Memanbetsu, Obihiro, Sapporo–Chitose
Air France	Paris–Charles de Gaulle
Air India	Delhi–Indira Gandhi, Mumbai–Shivaji
AirAsia X	Kuala Lumpur–International
All Nippon Airways	Akita, Bangkok–Suvarnabhumi, Beijing–Capital, Chicago–O'Hare, Delhi–Indira Gandhi, Frankfurt, Fukuoka, Guangzhou, Hakodate, Kushiro, Hachijojima, Ho Chi Minh City, Hong Kong, Honolulu, Houston–Intercontinental, Ishigaki, Istanbul, Iwakuni, Jakarta–Soekarno-Hatta, Kagoshima, Komatsu, Kuala Lumpur–International, Kumamoto, London–Heathrow, Los Angeles, Matsuyama, Manila, Milan–Malpensa, Monbetsu, Miyazaki, Munich, Nagasaki, Nagoya–Centrair, Naha, Nakashibetsu, New York–JFK, Noto, Odate-Noshiro, Oita, Okayama, Osaka–Itami, Osaka–Kansai, Paris–Charles de Gaulle, Qingdao, Saga, San Francisco, Sapporo–Chitose, Seattle/Tacoma, Seoul–Gimpo, Shanghai–Hongqiao, Shanghai–Pudong, Shenzhen, Shonai, Singapore, Stockholm–Arlanda, Sydney–Kingsford Smith, Taipei–Songshan, Takamatsu, Tottori, Toyama, Ube, Vancouver, Vienna, Wakkanai, Washington–Dulles, Yonago
American Airlines	Dallas/Fort Worth, Los Angeles, New York–JFK
Asiana Airlines	Seoul–Gimpo, Seoul–Incheon (both end 17 December 2026)
British Airways	London–Heathrow
Cathay Pacific	Hong Kong
China Airlines	Taipei–Songshan
China Eastern Airlines	Beijing–Daxing, Shanghai–Hongqiao, Shanghai–Pudong
China Southern Airlines	Beijing–Daxing, Guangzhou
Delta Air Lines	Atlanta, Detroit, Honolulu, Los Angeles, Minneapolis/St. Paul, Seattle/Tacoma
Emirates	Dubai–International
EVA Air	Taipei–Songshan
Finnair	Helsinki
Garuda Indonesia	Jakarta–Soekarno-Hatta
Hawaiian Airlines	Honolulu
HK Express	Hong Kong
ITA Airways	Rome–Fiumicino
Japan Airlines	Akita, Amami Ōshima, Aomori, Asahikawa, Bangkok–Suvarnabhumi, Beijing–Capital, Chicago–O'Hare, Dalian, Dallas/Fort Worth, Delhi–Indira Gandhi, Doha, Fukuoka, Guangzhou, Hakodate, Helsinki, Hiroshima, Ho Chi Minh City, Hong Kong, Honolulu, Izumo, Kagoshima, Kitakyushu, Kōchi, Kumamoto, Kushiro, London–Heathrow, Los Angeles, Manila, Memanbetsu, Misawa, Nagasaki, Naha, New York–JFK, Obihiro, Oita, Okayama, Osaka–Itami, Osaka–Kansai, Paris–Charles de Gaulle, San Francisco, Sapporo–Chitose, Seoul–Gimpo, Shanghai–Hongqiao, Shanghai–Pudong, Shirahama, Singapore, Sydney–Kingsford Smith, Taipei–Songshan, Tokushima, Ube, Yamagata
Korean Air	Seoul–Gimpo, Seoul–Incheon
Lufthansa	Frankfurt, Munich
Peach	Seoul–Incheon, Shanghai–Pudong, Taipei–Taoyuan
Philippine Airlines	Manila
Qantas	Sydney–Kingsford Smith
Qatar Airways	Doha
Scandinavian Airlines	Copenhagen
Scoot	Singapore
Shanghai Airlines	Shanghai–Hongqiao
Singapore Airlines	Singapore
Skymark Airlines	Fukuoka, Kagoshima, Kobe, Naha, Sapporo–Chitose, Shimojishima
Solaseed Air	Kagoshima, Kumamoto, Miyazaki, Nagasaki, Naha, Oita
Spring Airlines	Shanghai–Pudong
StarFlyer	Fukuoka, Kitakyushu, Osaka–Kansai, Ube
Thai Airways International	Bangkok–Suvarnabhumi
Tianjin Airlines	Tianjin
Tigerair Taiwan	Taipei–Taoyuan
Turkish Airlines	Istanbul
United Airlines	Chicago–O'Hare, Guam, Los Angeles, Newark, San Francisco, Washington–Dulles
VietJet Air	Ho Chi Minh City
Vietnam Airlines	Hanoi

== Statistics ==
Source: Japanese Ministry of Land, Infrastructure, Transport and Tourism

=== Busiest domestic routes (2024) ===
Rank	Airport	Passengers
1.	Sapporo–Chitose	9,007,372
2.	Fukuoka	8,647,386
3.	Naha	5,919,365
4.	Osaka–Itami	5,496,982
5.	Kagoshima	2,506,276
6.	Kumamoto	1,971,891
7.	Hiroshima	1,878,286
8.	Nagasaki	1,764,870
9.	Matsuyama	1,563,870
10.	Miyazaki	1,423,200
11.	Osaka–Kansai	1,258,675
12.	Takamatsu	1,252,568

=== Number of landings ===
- Domestic
- International

=== Number of passengers ===
- Domestic
- International

=== Cargo volume in tonnes ===
- Domestic
- International

=== On-time performance ===
In 2022, Haneda Airport was the most on-time international airport with the fewest delays worldwide. Flights departing Haneda had a 90.3% on-time departure rate across 373,264 total flights according to aviation analytics firm Cirium.

== Ground transport ==
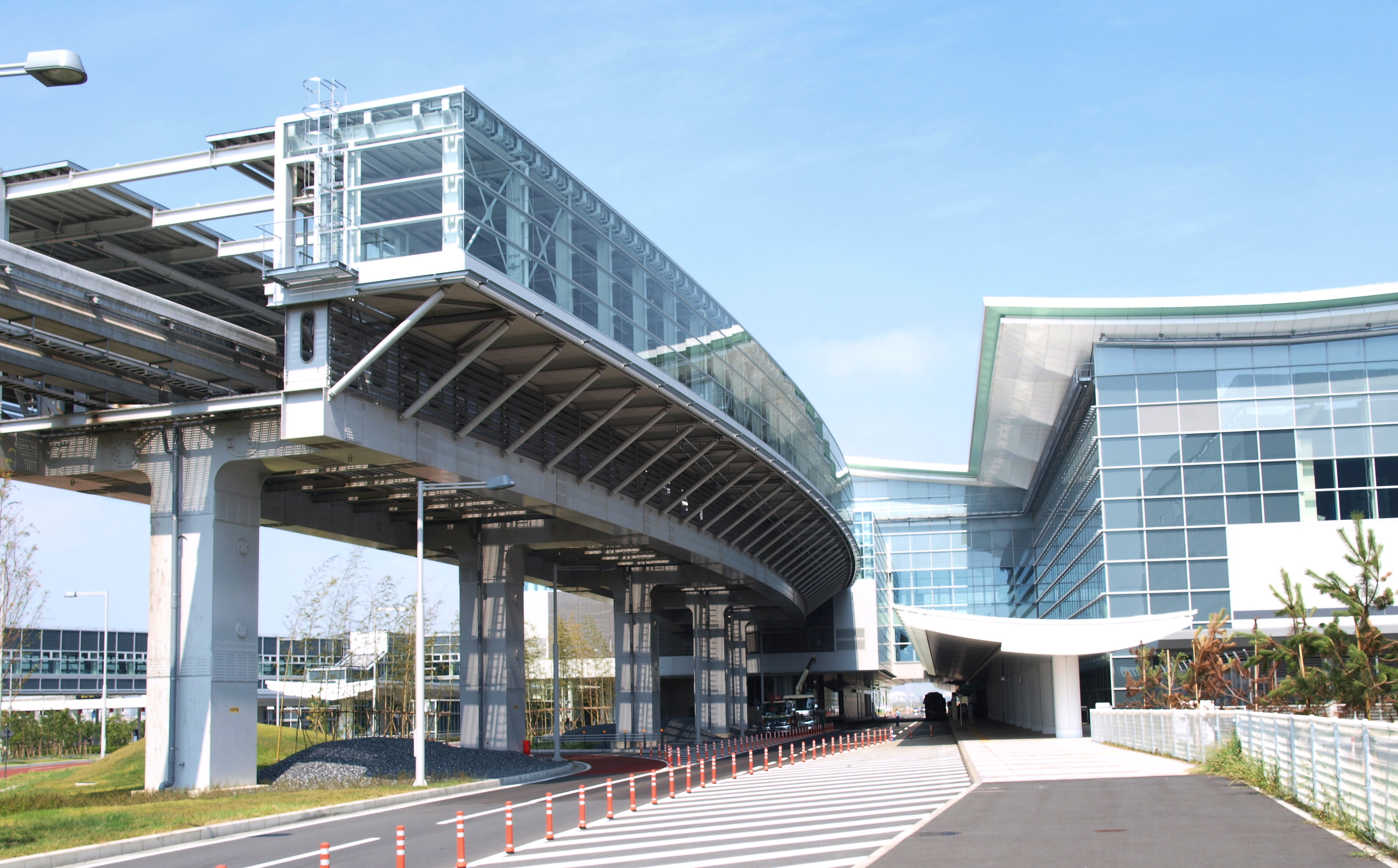
Tokyo monorail Terminal 3 Station

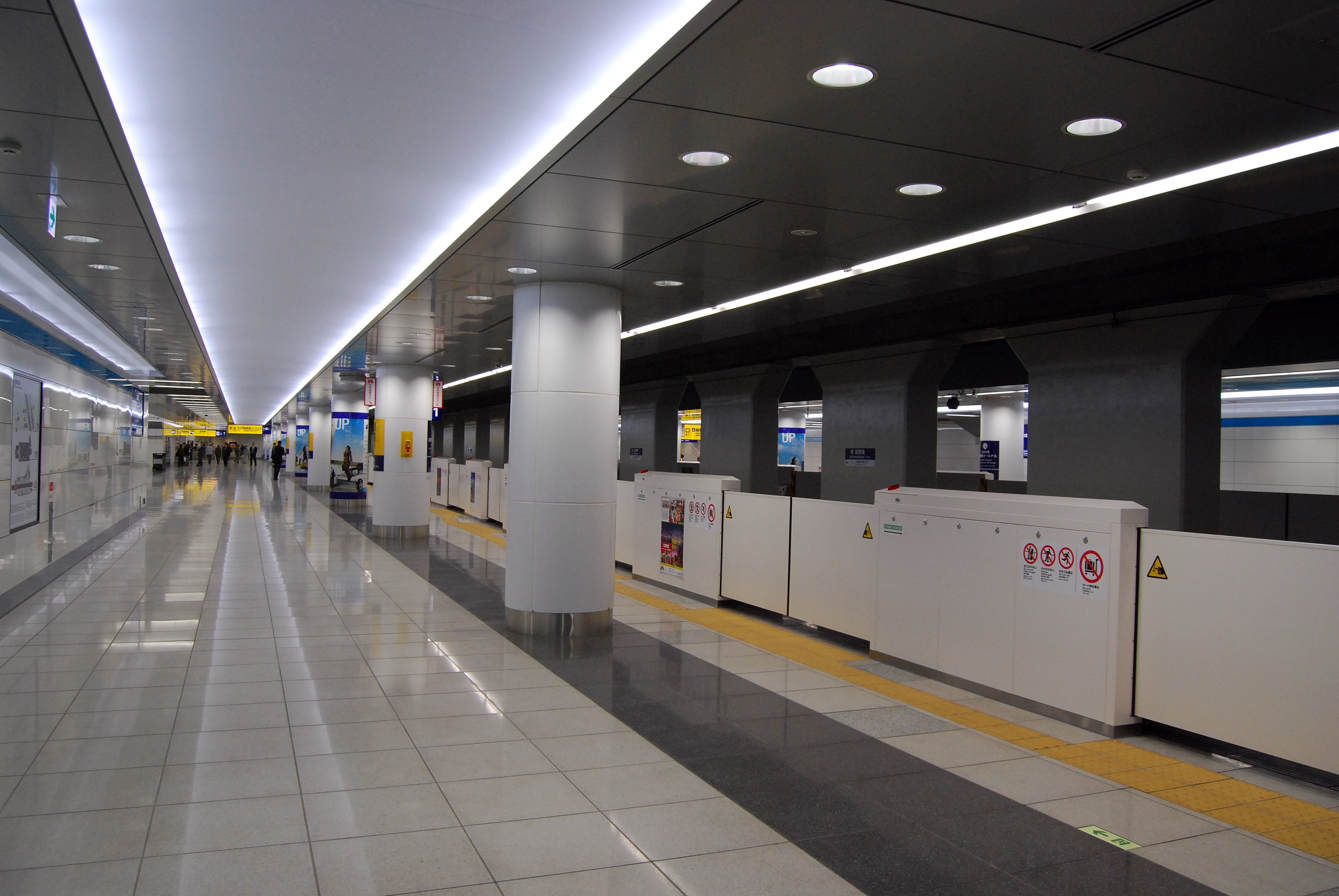
Keikyu Airport Line station

Haneda Airport is served by the Keikyu Airport Line and Tokyo Monorail. In addition, East Japan Railway Company's Haneda Airport Access Line is under construction and will connect Terminals 1 and 2 to central Tokyo by 2031.

The airport is bisected by the Shuto Expressway Bayshore Route and Japan National Route 357, while Shuto Expressway Route 1 and Tokyo Metropolitan Route 311 (Kampachi-dori Ave) run along the western perimeter. The Tamagawa Sky Bridge connects the airport with Japan National Route 409 and Shuto Expressway Route K6 to the southwest across the Tama River. The airport has five lots of parkades, marked from P1 to P5.

Scheduled bus service to various points in the Kanto region is provided by Airport Transport Service (Airport Limousine) and Keihin Kyuko Bus. Tokyo City Air Terminal, Shinjuku Expressway Bus Terminal and Yokohama City Air Terminal are major limousine bus terminals. Emirates operates bus services to Shinagawa Station and Tokyo Station.

Keisei runs direct suburban trains (called "Access Express") between Haneda and Narita in 93 minutes. There are also direct buses between the airports operated by Airport Limousine Bus. The journey takes 65–85 minutes or longer, depending on traffic.

== Accidents and incidents ==
- 26 August 1966: A Japan Air Lines Convair 880, leased from Japan Domestic Airlines on a training flight, crashed after takeoff when, after the nose lifted off, the aircraft yawed to the left. At 1,600 metres (5,200 ft) after the plane went off the runway, all the engines separated as well as the nose and left main gear. The aircraft caught fire. All five occupants died. Cause of left yaw unknown.
- 18 April 1977: A McDonnell Douglas DC-8 operating as Philippine Airlines flight 421 to Manila, left the runway prematurely on take-off, immediately banked left and returned to the runway heavily before veering onto the grass and coming to rest minus undercarriage and all four engines. All 127 passengers and 13 crew were evacuated safely, but the aircraft was a write off. The probable cause was determined to be failure of the left elevator drive assembly and gust lock.
- 2 January 2024: A ground collision occurred between an Airbus A350-941 from Sapporo–Chitose and a Japan Coast Guard De Havilland Canada DHC-8-315. All 379 occupants aboard the Japan Airlines flight were evacuated, while five of the six occupants aboard the Coast Guard aircraft were killed. Both aircraft were written off.
