= Tokachi Airfield =

Tokachi Airfield 十勝飛行場
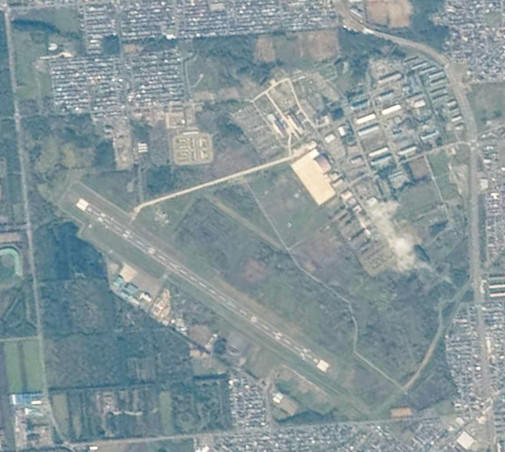
- JGSDF Camp Obihiro, taken from ISS in 2009
- IATA: none; ICAO: RJCT

Summary
- Airport type: Military
- Operator: Japan Ground Self-Defense Force
- Location: Obihiro, Hokkaidō, Japan
- Built: 1937
- Elevation AMSL: 281 ft / 86 m
- Coordinates: 42°53′25″N 143°09′30″E

Map
- Location in Japan RJCT (Japan)

Runways
Direction	Length		Surface
Direction	m	ft	Surface
13/31	1,500	4,921	Asphalt concrete
- Source: Japanese AIP at AIS Japan

Tokachi Airfield (十勝飛行場, Tokachi Hikōjō; formerly Obihiro Airport) (ICAO: RJCT) is an airfield located in Obihiro, Hokkaidō, Japan, operated by the Japan Ground Self-Defense Force (JGSDF). The airfield is situated close to JGSDF Camp Obihiro.

== History ==
The airfield first opened in 1937 as an airfield for the Imperial Japanese Navy. In 1956, operation was taken over by the JGSDF. In December 1964, the airfield became Obihiro Airport with a 1,000 m runway. In December 1972, the runway was extended to a length of 1,500 m. In February 1981, civil use of the airport ceased ahead of the opening of Tokachi-Obihiro Airport in March 1981. It is still operational as a general aviation airfield ever since the opening of the new airport.

== Accidents and incidents ==
On May 29, 1965, a Convair 240 JA5088 landed at Obihiro Airport with the right side main landing gear retracted after it failed to lock down; no casualties.
