= Solaseed Air =

Japanese regional airline

Solaseed Air Inc. 株式会社ソラシド・エア Kabushiki-gaisha Sorashido Ea

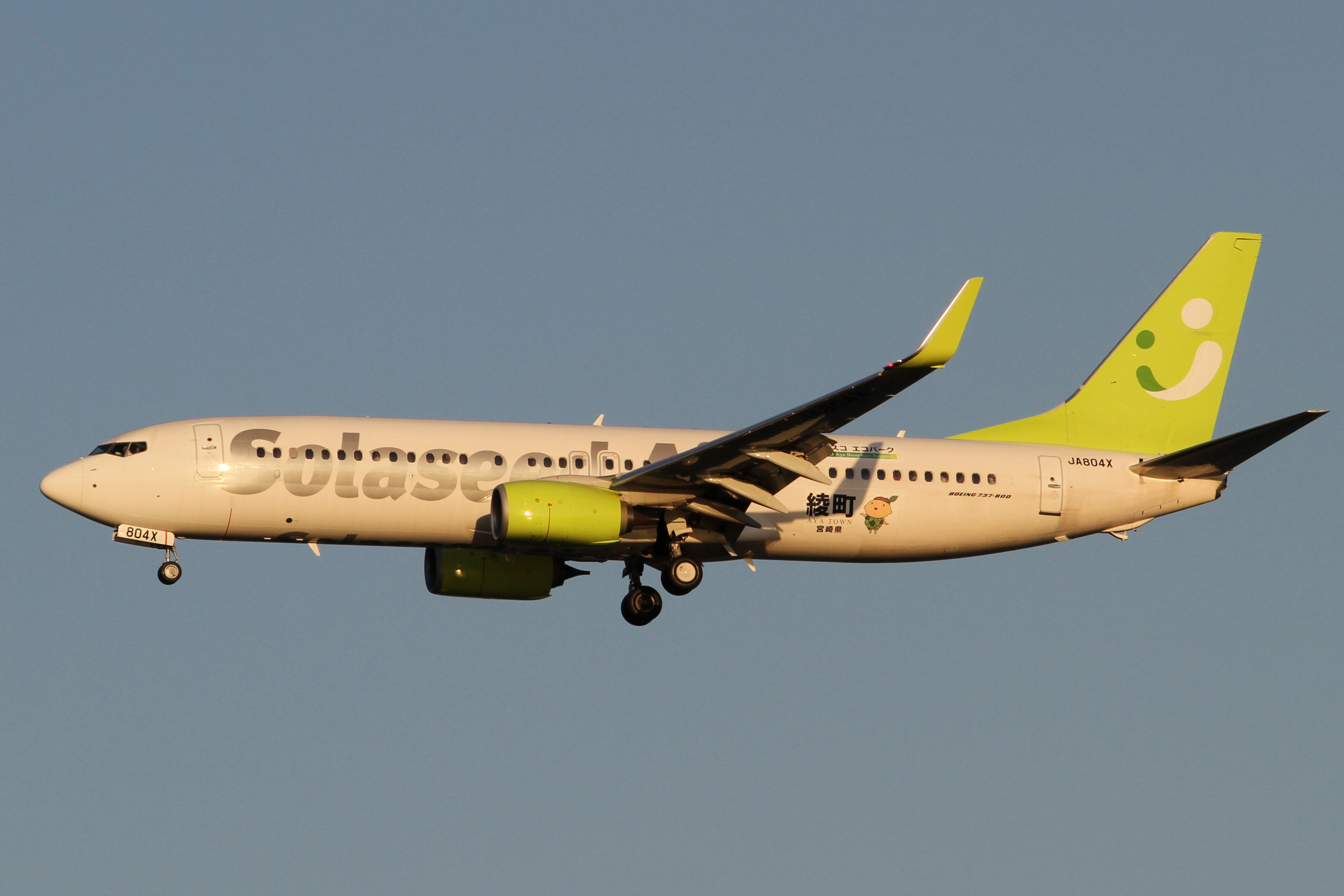
- Solaseed Air 737-86N in standard livery
IATA	ICAO	Call sign
6J	SNJ	NEWSKY
- Founded: July 3, 1997; 29 years ago (as Pan Asia Airlines); May 2002; 24 years ago (as Skynet Asia Airways)
- Commenced operations: July 2002; 24 years ago (as Skynet Asia Airways); July 1, 2011; 15 years ago (as Solaseed Air)
- Operating bases: Naha; Miyazaki; Tokyo–Haneda
- Frequent-flyer program: Solaseed Smile Club
- Fleet size: 14
- Destinations: 11
- Parent company: RegionalPlus Wings Corp.
- Headquarters: Miyazaki Airport, Miyazaki, Japan
- Key people: Kosuke Takahashi (CEO)
- Website: www.solaseedair.jp

Solaseed Air is a Japanese regional airline headquartered on the property of Miyazaki Airport in Miyazaki, Miyazaki Prefecture, Japan. It operates services mainly between Honshu and destinations on the island of Kyushu and Okinawa Prefecture.

== History ==
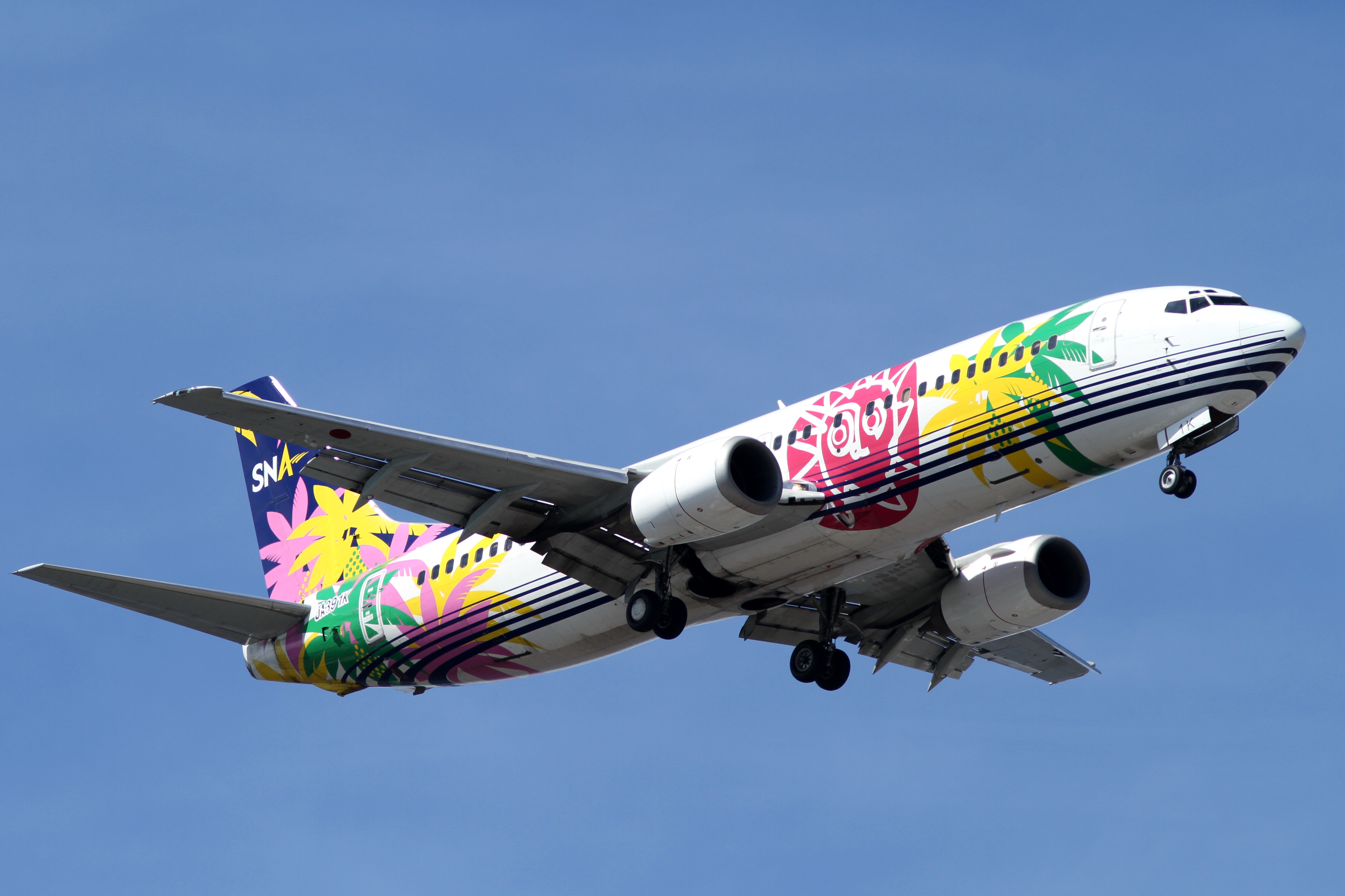
A Skynet Asia Airways Boeing 737-400 (2010).

The airline was established as Pan Asia Airlines in 1997 as the fourth airline established in a deregulated Japanese market. In August 1998, the airline's corporate name was changed to "Skynet Asia Airways Co., Ltd." before operations commenced in July 2002 as Skynet Asia Airways. The airline rebranded as "Solaseed Air" in July 2011, and the change of its legal corporate name to "Solaseed Air Inc." followed in December 2015.

In May 2021, Solaseed Air and Air Do announced their intentions to merge as a result of operating difficulties during the COVID-19 pandemic. The new holding company for both airlines, RegionalPlus Wings, was officially established on October 3, 2022.

== Corporate affairs ==
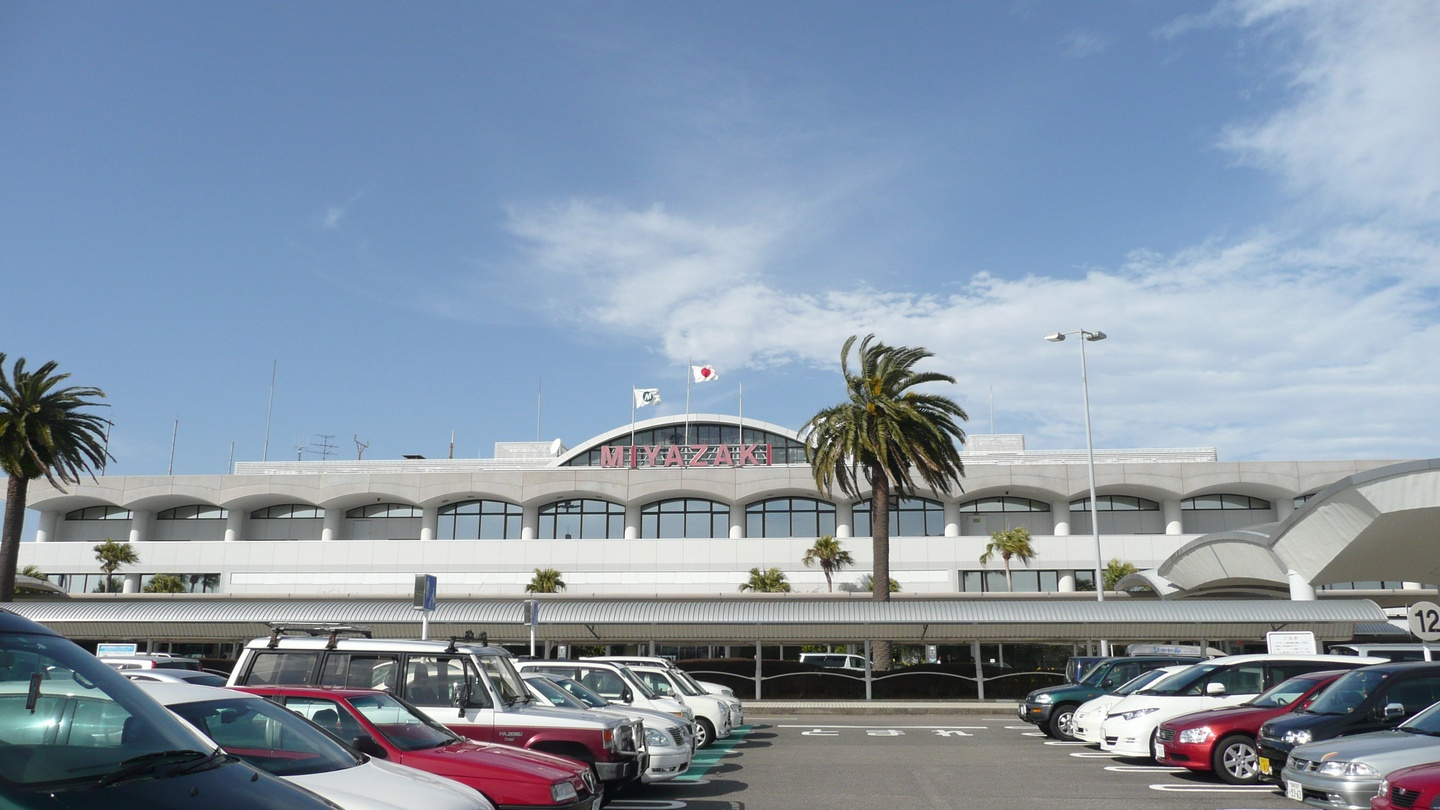
Miyazaki Airport, the location of the headquarters

Solaseed Air's head office is on the second floor of the Miyazaki Airport Building (宮崎空港ビル, Miyazaki Kūkō Biru) in Miyazaki, Miyazaki Prefecture, Japan. Its headquarters previously occupied different facilities in Miyazaki City, including the SNA Center (SNAセンター SNA Sentā) in the Again Building (アゲインビル, Agein Biru) in Miyazaki.

== Destinations ==
As of May 2021, Solaseed Air operates or has operated scheduled services to the following destinations in Japan:

Region	City	Airport	Notes	Refs
Honshu	Kobe	Kobe Airport		
Honshu	Nagoya	Chubu Centrair International Airport		
Honshu	Tokyo	Haneda Airport	Base	
Kyushu	Fukuoka	Fukuoka Airport		
Kyushu	Kagoshima	Kagoshima Airport		
Kyushu	Kumamoto	Kumamoto Airport		
Kyushu	Miyazaki	Miyazaki Airport		
Kyushu	Nagasaki	Nagasaki Airport		
Kyushu	Oita	Oita Airport		
Ryukyu Islands	Ishigaki	New Ishigaki Airport		
Ryukyu Islands	Naha	Naha Airport	Base	

In October 2015, the airline operated two return charter flights to Kaohsiung from October 17 to October 20. It has since occasionally operated international charter flights to Seoul and Taipei from airports in Kyushu and Okinawa.

=== Codeshare agreements ===
Solaseed Air has codeshare agreements with the following airlines:

- All Nippon Airways
- StarFlyer

=== Interline agreements ===
In addition to the aforementioned codeshare partners, Solaseed Air has interlining agreements with the following airlines:

- Air Do
- Oriental Air Bridge

== Fleet ==
=== Current fleet ===
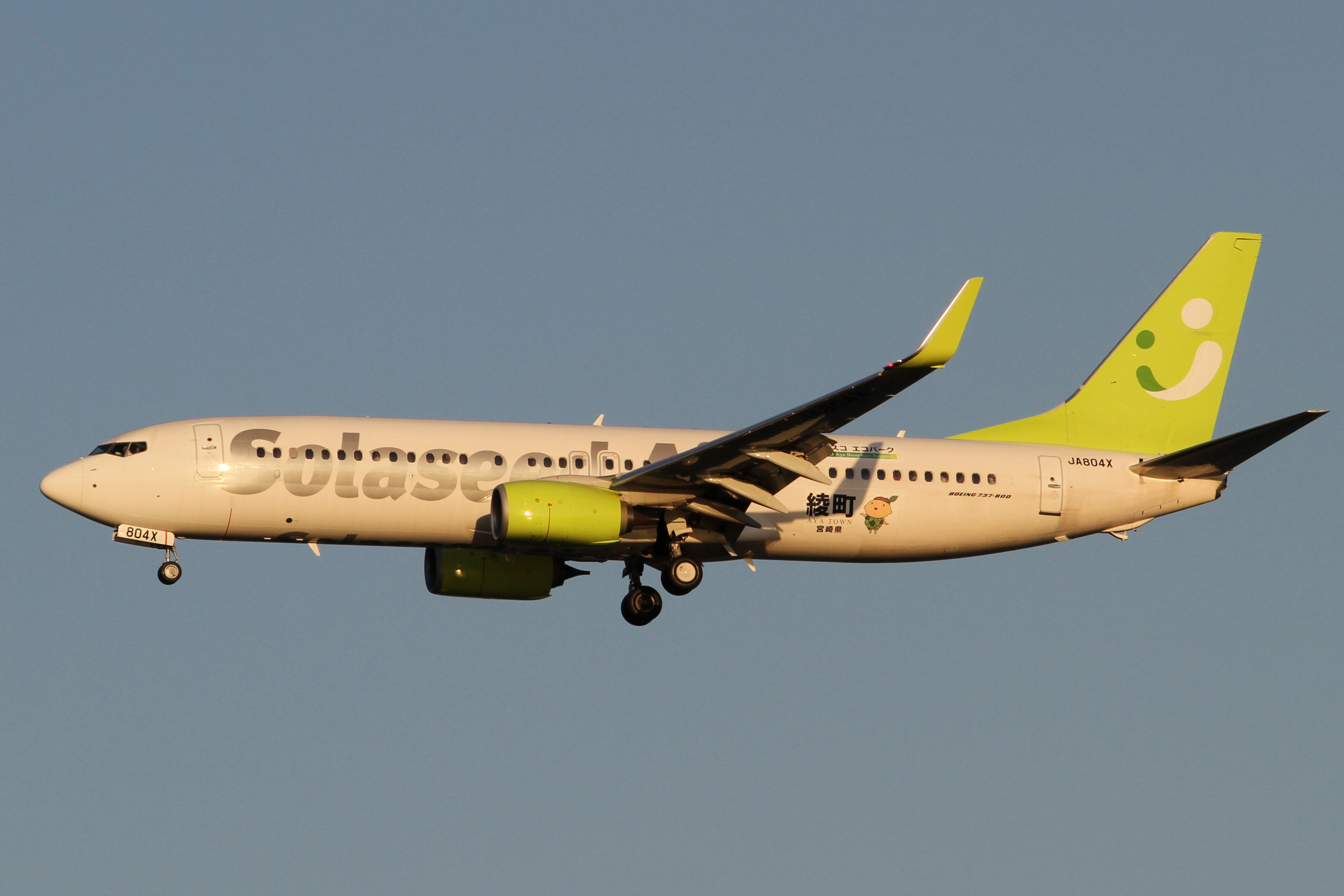
Solaseed Air Boeing 737-800

As of July 2026, Solaseed Air operates the following aircraft:

Solaseed Air fleet
Aircraft	In service	Orders	Passengers	Notes
Boeing 737-800	13	—	174	
Boeing 737-800	1	—	176	leased from All Nippon Airways
Total	14	—		

=== Former fleet ===
As of August 2025, Solaseed Air operated 14 Boeing 737-800.

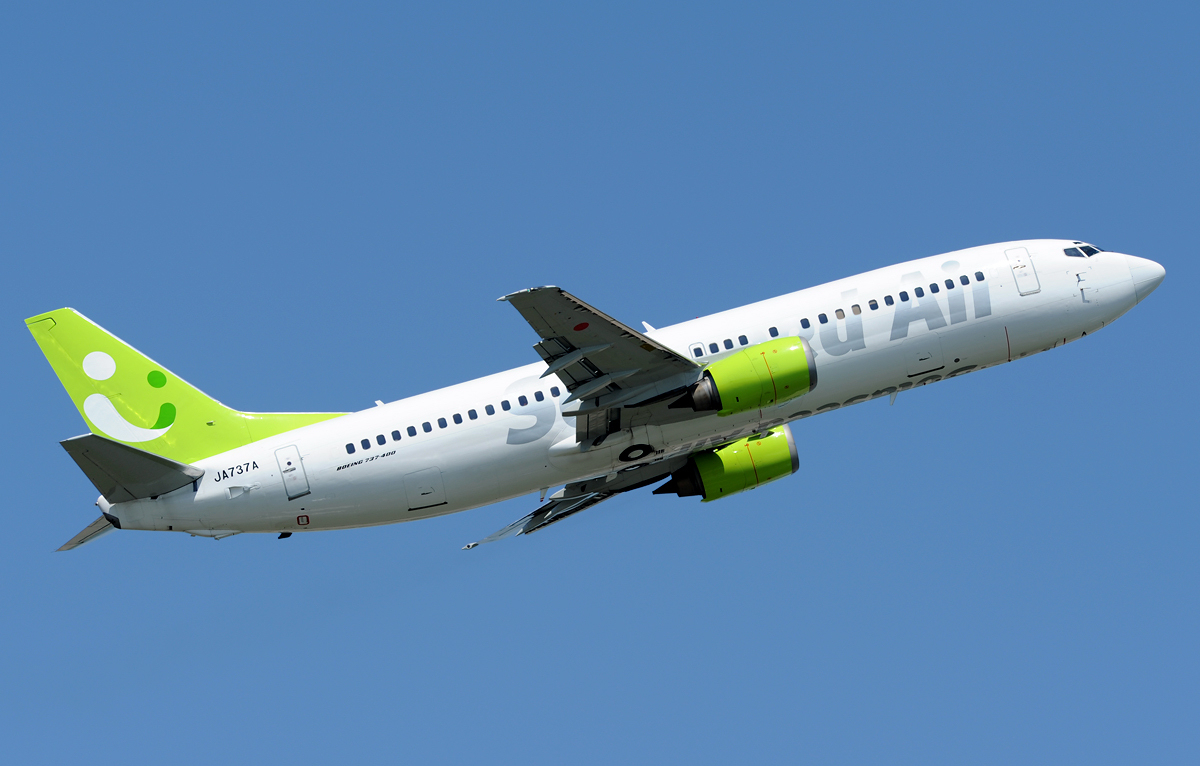
A former Solaseed Air Boeing 737-400 (2012)

In September 2014, Solaseed Air retired its last remaining Boeing 737-400 aircraft after previously operating a total of ten 737-400s. The airline has since exclusively operated a fleet of Boeing 737-800 aircraft.

=== Special liveries ===
In December 2020, the airline repainted one of its Boeing 737-800 aircraft, registered (JA812X), in a Pokémon-themed livery featuring Exeggutor as part of a tourism collaboration with Miyazaki City and The Pokémon Company, during which Exeggutor became Miyazaki's mascot in the collaboration. The aircraft's maiden flight under the promotional livery traveled from Miyazaki to Tokyo. The livery was removed in September 2022.

In March 2023, the airline reintroduced the Pokémon themed livery featuring Exeggutor again on another Boeing 737-800 registered (JA803X). The livery is expected to stay with the aircraft for three years.

== Cabin and services ==
Solaseed Air's Boeing 737-800 aircraft are configured with 174 or 176 economy class seats, with a standard pitch of 32 inches (81 cm). Refreshment services, amenities, and services for families with small children are provided complimentary.

== Frequent-flyer program ==
Solaseed Air's frequent-flyer program is Solaseed Smile Club. Passengers can accrue mileage under the program based on both the fare and route length of Solaseed Air flights.
