= Tokumei kumiai =

Tokumei kumiai (匿名組合), literally "anonymous partnerships," are a Japanese bilateral contract governed by the Commercial Code of Japan, Article 535 et seq. In English, they are often called TK or silent partnerships. In many respects they are similar to common law limited partnerships.

In a tokumei kumiai arrangement, "anonymous (or silent) partners" (匿名組合員, tokumei kumiai'in) invest in a venture operated by a manager (営業者, eigyōsha).

By law, the partnership itself has no legal personality. Any assets of the partnership are the property of the manager; however, the anonymous partners have a right to a share of any profits from the venture, as provided in the partnership agreement. Anonymous partners have limited liability for the partnership's debts, on the condition that they are anonymous. If an anonymous partner allows their name to be used in the name of the manager or in the name of the partnership, the anonymous partner loses their limited liability.

Tokumei kumiai are often used for investment funds. A structure known as the "Dutch TK" was once popular among foreign investors in Japan, as it was possible to recognize income from Japan through a Dutch anonymous partner in a tokumei kumiai without paying Japanese income or withholding taxes under the tax treaty of 1970. This loophole was closed by a new tax treaty in August 2010, which imposes a 20% withholding tax on distributions through such structures. More recently, it has become popular to use a tokumei kumiai together with a godo kaisha to hold a trust beneficial interest in real estate using what is known as a "TK/GK scheme."

== See also ==
- Limited liability partnership
