= List of Korean Air destinations =

Korean Air flies to ten domestic destinations and almost 150 international destinations in 50 countries on five continents (except seasonal charter), including destinations for cargo services.

== List ==
Country	City	Airport	Notes	Refs
Armenia	Yerevan	Zvartnots International Airport	Terminated	
Australia	Brisbane	Brisbane Airport	Passenger	
Australia	Cairns	Cairns Airport ^{Charter}	Terminated	
Australia	Melbourne	Melbourne Airport	Seasonal; Resumes 18 December 2026	
Australia	Sydney	Sydney Airport	Passenger	
Austria	Vienna	Vienna International Airport	Passenger + cargo	
Bahrain	Manama	Bahrain International Airport	Terminated	
Bangladesh	Dhaka	Hazrat Shahjalal International Airport	Cargo	
Belgium	Brussels	Brussels Airport	Cargo	
Brazil	Campinas	Viracopos International Airport	Cargo	
Brazil	São Paulo	São Paulo/Guarulhos International Airport	Terminated	
Cambodia	Phnom Penh	Phnom Penh International Airport	Airport closed	
Cambodia	Phnom Penh	Techo International Airport	Passenger	
Cambodia	Siem Reap	Siem Reap–Angkor International Airport	Seasonal	
Cambodia	Siem Reap	Siem Reap International Airport	Airport closed	
Canada	Calgary	Calgary International Airport ^{Charter}	Terminated	
Canada	Edmonton	Edmonton International Airport ^{Charter}	Cargo	
Canada	Halifax	Halifax Stanfield International Airport	Cargo	
Canada	Québec City	Québec City Jean Lesage International Airport ^{Seasonal charter}	Terminated	
Canada	Toronto	Toronto Pearson International Airport	Passenger + cargo	
Canada	Vancouver	Vancouver International Airport	Passenger + cargo	
Chile	Santiago	Arturo Merino Benítez International Airport	Cargo	
China	Beijing	Beijing Capital International Airport	Passenger + cargo	
China	Changsha	Changsha Huanghua International Airport	Passenger	
China	Chengdu	Chengdu Shuangliu International Airport	Cargo	
China	Dalian	Dalian Zhoushuizi International Airport	Passenger	
China	Fuzhou	Fuzhou Changle International Airport	Passenger	
China	Guangzhou	Guangzhou Baiyun International Airport	Passenger + cargo	
China	Guiyang	Guiyang Longdongbao International Airport	Terminated	
China	Hangzhou	Hangzhou Xiaoshan International Airport	Passenger	
China	Hefei	Hefei Xinqiao International Airport	Passenger	
China	Huangshan	Huangshan Tunxi International Airport ^{Passenger}	Suspended	
China	Jinan	Jinan Yaoqiang International Airport ^{Passenger}	Suspended	
China	Kunming	Kunming Changshui International Airport	Passenger	
China	Mudanjiang	Mudanjiang Hailang International Airport	Passenger	
China	Nanchang	Nanchang Changbei International Airport ^{Charter}	Terminated	
China	Nanning	Nanning Wuxu International Airport	Terminated	
China	Nanjing	Nanjing Lukou International Airport	Passenger	
China	Qingdao	Qingdao Jiaodong International Airport	Passenger	
China	Qingdao	Qingdao Liuting International Airport	Airport closed	
China	Sanya	Sanya Phoenix International Airport	Seasonal charter	
China	Shanghai	Shanghai Hongqiao International Airport	Passenger	
China	Shanghai	Shanghai Pudong International Airport	Passenger + cargo	
China	Shenyang	Shenyang Taoxian International Airport	Passenger + cargo	
China	Shenzhen	Shenzhen Bao'an International Airport	Passenger	
China	Tianjin	Tianjin Binhai International Airport	Passenger + cargo	
China	Ürümqi	Ürümqi Diwopu International Airport ^{Seasonal}	Terminated	
China	Weihai	Weihai Dashuipo International Airport ^{Passenger}	Suspended	
China	Wuhan	Wuhan Tianhe International Airport	Passenger	
China	Xi'an	Xi'an Xianyang International Airport	Passenger + cargo	
China	Xiamen	Xiamen Gaoqi International Airport	Passenger	
China	Xining	Xining Caojiabao International Airport ^{Charter}	Terminated	
China	Yanji	Yanji Chaoyangchuan International Airport	Passenger	
China	Yantai	Yantai Penglai International Airport ^{Passenger}	Suspended	
China	Zhangjiajie	Zhangjiajie Hehua International Airport	Passenger	
China	Zhengzhou	Zhengzhou Xinzheng International Airport	Passenger + cargo	
Colombia	Bogotá	El Dorado International Airport	Cargo	
Croatia	Dubrovnik	Dubrovnik Airport ^{Sesaonsl charter}	Terminated	
Croatia	Zagreb	Zagreb Airport ^{Passenger}	Suspended	
Czech Republic	Prague	Václav Havel Airport Prague	Passenger	
Denmark	Copenhagen	Copenhagen Airport ^{Cargo}	Terminated	
Egypt	Cairo	Cairo International Airport	Terminated	
Fiji	Nadi	Nadi International Airport	Terminated	
France	Marseille	Marseille Provence Airport	Seasonal charter	
France	Paris	Charles de Gaulle Airport	Passenger + cargo	
France	Paris	Orly Airport	Terminated	
Georgia	Tbilisi	Tbilisi International Airport	Terminated	
Germany	Frankfurt	Frankfurt Airport	Passenger + cargo	
Germany	Munich	Munich Airport	Terminated	
Greece	Athens	Athens International Airport	Seasonal charter	
Guam	Hagåtña	Antonio B. Won Pat International Airport	Passenger	
Hong Kong	Hong Kong	Hong Kong International Airport	Passenger + cargo	
Hong Kong	Hong Kong	Kai Tak International Airport	Airport closed	
Hungary	Budapest	Budapest Ferenc Liszt International Airport	Passenger + cargo	
India	Chennai	Chennai International Airport	Cargo	
India	Delhi	Indira Gandhi International Airport	Passenger + cargo	
India	Mumbai	Chhatrapati Shivaji Maharaj International Airport	Terminated	
Indonesia	Batam	Hang Nadim International Airport	Terminated	
Indonesia	Denpasar	Ngurah Rai International Airport	Passenger	
Indonesia	Jakarta	Soekarno–Hatta International Airport	Passenger + cargo	
Indonesia	Lombok	Lombok International Airport ^{Seasonal charter}	Terminated	
Iran	Tehran	Tehran Mehrabad International Airport ^{Cargo}	Terminated	
Iraq	Baghdad	Baghdad International Airport	Terminated	
Israel	Tel Aviv	Ben Gurion Airport	Terminated	
Italy	Milan	Milan Malpensa Airport	Passenger + cargo	
Italy	Rome	Leonardo da Vinci–Fiumicino Airport	Passenger	
Japan	Akita	Akita Airport	Terminated	
Japan	Asahikawa	Asahikawa Airport ^{Seasonal}	Terminated	
Japan	Aomori	Aomori Airport	Passenger	
Japan	Fukuoka	Fukuoka Airport	Passenger	
Japan	Hakodate	Hakodate Airport	Terminated	
Japan	Hiroshima	Hiroshima Airport	Begins 23 December 2026	
Japan	Kagoshima	Kagoshima Airport	Passenger	
Japan	Kitakyushu	Kitakyushu Airport	Cargo	
Japan	Kobe	Kobe Airport	Passenger	
Japan	Komatsu	Komatsu Airport	Passenger	
Japan	Kumamoto	Kumamoto Airport	Passenger	
Japan	Nagoya	Chubu Centrair International Airport	Passenger	
Japan	Nagoya	Nagoya Komaki Airport	Terminated	
Japan	Nagasaki	Nagasaki Airport	Passenger	
Japan	Niigata	Niigata Airport	Passenger	
Japan	Oita	Oita Airport	Passenger	
Japan	Okayama	Okayama Airport	Passenger	
Japan	Okinawa	Naha Airport	Passenger	
Japan	Osaka	Kansai International Airport	Passenger + cargo	
Japan	Osaka	Osaka International Airport	Terminated	
Japan	Sapporo	New Chitose Airport	Passenger	
Japan	Tokyo	Haneda International Airport	Passenger	
Japan	Tokyo	Narita International Airport	Passenger + cargo	
Jordan	Amman	Queen Alia International Airport ^{Charter}	Terminated	
Kenya	Nairobi	Jomo Kenyatta International Airport	Terminated	
Kuwait	Kuwait City	Kuwait International Airport	Terminated	
Libya	Tripoli	Tripoli International Airport	Airport closed	
Macau	Macau	Macau International Airport	Passenger	
Malaysia	Johor Bahru	Senai International Airport ^{Cargo}	Terminated	
Malaysia	Kota Kinabalu	Kota Kinabalu International Airport	Terminated	
Malaysia	Kuala Lumpur	Kuala Lumpur International Airport	Passenger + cargo	
Malaysia	Kuching	Kuching International Airport	Terminated	
Malaysia	Langkawi	Langkawi International Airport ^{Charter}	Terminated	
Malaysia	Penang	Penang International Airport	Cargo	
Maldives	Malé	Velana International Airport ^{Passenger}	Suspended	
Mexico	Guadalajara	Guadalajara International Airport	Cargo	
Mongolia	Ulaanbaatar	Buyant-Ukhaa International Airport	Airport closed	
Mongolia	Ulaanbaatar	Chinggis Khaan International Airport	Passenger	
Myanmar	Yangon	Yangon International Airport	Passenger	
Nepal	Kathmandu	Tribhuvan International Airport	Seasonal	
Netherlands	Amsterdam	Amsterdam Airport Schiphol	Passenger + cargo	
New Zealand	Auckland	Auckland Airport	Passenger	
New Zealand	Christchurch	Christchurch Airport ^{Seasonal}	Terminated	
North Korea	Pyongyang	Pyongyang International Airport ^{Special Charter}	Terminated	
Norway	Oslo	Oslo Gardermoen Airport	Cargo	
Palau	Koror	Roman Tmetuchl International Airport ^{Passenger}	Suspended	
Peru	Lima	Jorge Chávez International Airport	Cargo	
Philippines	Cebu	Mactan–Cebu International Airport	Passenger	
Philippines	Clark	Clark International Airport ^{Passenger}	Suspended	
Philippines	Manila	Ninoy Aquino International Airport	Passenger + cargo	
Portugal	Lisbon	Lisbon Airport	Passenger	
Russia	Irkutsk	Irkutsk International Airport ^{Seasonal}	Terminated	
Russia	Moscow	Sheremetyevo International Airport ^{Passenger + cargo}	Terminated	
Russia	Saint Petersburg	Pulkovo Airport ^{Passenger}	Terminated	
Russia	Vladivostok	Vladivostok International Airport ^{Passenger}	Terminated	
Saudi Arabia	Dhahran	Dhahran International Airport	Airport closed	
Saudi Arabia	Jeddah	King Abdulaziz International Airport	Terminated	
Saudi Arabia	Riyadh	King Khalid International Airport	Terminated	
Singapore	Singapore	Changi Airport	Passenger + cargo	
South Korea	Busan	Gimhae International Airport	Focus city	
South Korea	Cheongju	Cheongju International Airport	Passenger + cargo	
South Korea	Daegu	Daegu International Airport	Passenger	
South Korea	Gangneung	Gangneung Airport	Airport closed	
South Korea	Gunsan	Gunsan Airport	Terminated	
South Korea	Gwangju	Gwangju Airport	Passenger	
South Korea	Jeju	Jeju International Airport	Focus city	
South Korea	Mokpo	Mokpo Airport	Airport closed	
South Korea	Muan	Muan International Airport	Terminated	
South Korea	Pohang	Pohang Gyeongju Airport	Terminated	
South Korea	Sacheon	Sacheon Airport	Passenger	
South Korea	Seoul	Gimpo International Airport	Domestic hub	
South Korea	Seoul	Incheon International Airport	International hub	
South Korea	Sokcho	Sokcho Airport	Airport closed	
South Korea	Ulsan	Ulsan Airport	Passenger	
South Korea	Wonju	Wonju Airport	Terminated	
South Korea	Yangyang	Yangyang International Airport	Terminated	
South Korea	Yecheon	Yecheon Airport	Airport closed	
South Korea	Yeosu	Yeosu Airport	Passenger	
Spain	Barcelona	Josep Tarradellas Barcelona–El Prat Airport	Terminated	
Spain	Madrid	Madrid–Barajas Airport	Passenger + cargo	
Spain	Santiago de Compostela	Santiago de Compostela Airport ^{Charter}	Terminated	
Spain	Zaragoza	Zaragoza Airport	Cargo	
Sri Lanka	Colombo	Bandaranaike International Airport ^{Passenger}	Suspended	
Sweden	Gothenburg	Göteborg Landvetter Airport ^{Cargo}	Terminated	
Sweden	Luleå	Luleå Airport ^{Cargo}	Terminated	
Sweden	Stockholm	Stockholm Arlanda Airport	Cargo	
Switzerland; France; Germany	Basel; Mulhouse; Freiburg	EuroAirport Basel Mulhouse Freiburg	Cargo	
Switzerland; France; Germany	Basel; Mulhouse; Freiburg	EuroAirport Basel Mulhouse Freiburg	Seasonal charter	
Switzerland	Zürich	Zürich International Airport	Passenger + cargo	
Taiwan	Taichung	Taichung International Airport	Passenger	
Taiwan	Taipei	Taoyuan International Airport	Passenger	
Thailand	Bangkok	Don Mueang International Airport	Terminated	
Thailand	Bangkok	Suvarnabhumi International Airport	Passenger + cargo	
Thailand	Chiang Mai	Chiang Mai International Airport	Passenger	
Thailand	Krabi	Krabi International Airport ^{Seasonal charter}	Terminated	
Thailand	Phuket	Phuket International Airport	Passenger	
Turkey	Istanbul	Istanbul Arnavutköy International Airport	Passenger	
Turkey	Istanbul	Istanbul Atatürk International Airport	Airport closed	
United Arab Emirates	Abu Dhabi	Abu Dhabi International Airport	Terminated	
United Arab Emirates	Dubai	Dubai International Airport	Passenger	
United Kingdom	Glasgow	Glasgow Airport ^{Seasonal charter}	Terminated	
United Kingdom	London	London Gatwick International Airport	Terminated	
United Kingdom	London	London Heathrow International Airport	Passenger + cargo	
United Kingdom	London	London Stansted International Airport ^{Cargo}	Terminated	
United States	Anchorage	Ted Stevens Anchorage International Airport	Cargo	
United States	Atlanta	Hartsfield–Jackson Atlanta International Airport	Passenger + cargo	
United States	Boston	Logan International Airport	Passenger	
United States	Chicago	Chicago O'Hare International Airport	Passenger + cargo	
United States	Chicago	Chicago Rockford International Airport	Cargo	
United States	Columbus	Rickenbacker International Airport	Cargo	
United States	Dallas	Dallas Fort Worth International Airport	Passenger + cargo	
United States	Denver	Denver International Airport	Terminated	
United States	Honolulu	Daniel K. Inouye International Airport	Passenger	
United States	Houston	George Bush Intercontinental Airport	Terminated	
United States	Las Vegas	Harry Reid International Airport	Passenger	
United States	Los Angeles	Los Angeles International Airport	Passenger + cargo	
United States	Miami	Miami International Airport	Cargo	
United States	Minneapolis	Minneapolis–Saint Paul International Airport ^{Charter}	Terminated	
United States	Newark	Newark Liberty International Airport	Resumes 22 May 2027	
United States	New York City	John F. Kennedy International Airport	Passenger + cargo	
United States	Portland, OR	Portland International Airport ^{Cargo}	Terminated	
United States	San Francisco	San Francisco International Airport	Passenger + cargo	
United States	Seattle	Seattle–Tacoma International Airport	Passenger + cargo	
United States	Washington, D.C.	Dulles International Airport	Passenger	
Uzbekistan	Navoi	Navoi International Airport	Cargo	
Uzbekistan	Tashkent	Tashkent International Airport	Passenger	
Vietnam	Da Lat	Lien Khuong Airport ^{Passenger}	Suspended	
Vietnam	Da Nang	Da Nang International Airport	Passenger	
Vietnam	Hanoi	Noi Bai International Airport	Passenger + cargo	
Vietnam	Ho Chi Minh City	Tan Son Nhat International Airport	Passenger + cargo	
Vietnam	Nha Trang	Cam Ranh International Airport	Passenger	
Vietnam	Phu Quoc	Phu Quoc International Airport	Passenger	
