= List of airports in South Korea =

This is a list of airports in the Republic of Korea (South Korea), grouped by type and sorted by location. Airport names shown in bold indicate that the facility has scheduled service on commercial airlines.

Location	ICAO	IATA	Operator	Airport name
**Civil airports**
Seoul/Incheon	RKSI	ICN	Incheon International Airport Corporation	**Incheon International Airport**
Seoul/Gimpo	RKSS	GMP	Korea Airports Corporation	**Gimpo International Airport**
Jeju	RKPC	CJU	Korea Airports Corporation	**Jeju International Airport**
Muan	RKJB	MWX	Korea Airports Corporation	**Muan International Airport**
Ulsan	RKPU	USN	Korea Airports Corporation	**Ulsan Airport**
Yangyang	RKNY	YNY	Korea Airports Corporation	**Yangyang International Airport**
Yeosu	RKJY	RSU	Korea Airports Corporation	**Yeosu Airport**
**Military/civil dual-use airports**
Busan	RKPK	PUS	Korea Airports Corporation, Republic of Korea Air Force	**Gimhae International Airport**
Cheongju	RKTU	CJJ	Korea Airports Corporation, Republic of Korea Air Force	**Cheongju International Airport**
Daegu	RKTN	TAE	Korea Airports Corporation, Republic of Korea Air Force	**Daegu International Airport**
Gunsan	RKJK	KUV	Korea Airports Corporation, Republic of Korea Air Force, United States Air Force (USAFK)	**Gunsan Airport**
Gwangju	RKJJ	KWJ	Korea Airports Corporation, Republic of Korea Air Force	**Gwangju Airport**
Pohang	RKTH	KPO	Korea Airports Corporation, Republic of Korea Navy	**Pohang Gyeongju Airport**
Sacheon	RKPS	HIN	Korea Airports Corporation, Republic of Korea Air Force	**Sacheon Airport**
Wonju/Hoengseong	RKNW	WJU	Korea Airports Corporation, Republic of Korea Air Force	**Wonju Airport**
**Civil airfields**
Jeju/Seogwipo	RKPD	JDG	Korean Air	Jeongseok Airport (Jungseok Airport)
Taean	RKTA		Hanseo University	Hanseo University Taean Airfield
Uljin	RKTL	UJN	Busan Regional Aviation Administration, Korea Aerospace University, Korea Aviation College	Uljin Airfield
**Military airport**
Seoul/Seongnam	RKSM	SSN	Republic of Korea Air Force	Seoul Air Base
**Military airbases**
Chungju	RKTI		Republic of Korea Air Force	Jungwon Air Base
Cheongju/Korea Air Force Academy	RKTE		Republic of Korea Air Force	Seongmu Air Base
Gangneung	RKNN	KAG	Republic of Korea Air Force	Gangneung Air Base
Goyang	RKRS		Republic of Korea Army, Korea Aerospace University	Susaek Air Base
Jeonju	RKJU	CHN	Republic of Korea Army	Jeonju Air Base
Jinhae	RKPE	CHF	Republic of Korea Navy	Jinhae Air Base
Mokpo	RKJM	~~MPK~~	Republic of Korea Navy	Mokpo Air Base
Pyeongtaek	RKSG		United States Army (USFK)	Camp Humphreys
Pyeongtaek/Osan	RKSO	OSN	United States Air Force (USAFK)	Osan Air Base
Seosan	RKTP	HMY	Republic of Korea Air Force	Seosan Air Base
Sokcho	RKND	~~SHO~~	Republic of Korea Army	Sokcho Air Base
Suwon	RKSW	SWU	Republic of Korea Air Force	Suwon Air Base
Yecheon	RKTY	YEC	Republic of Korea Air Force	Yecheon Air Base
**Promulgated construction plans**
Jeju/Seogwipo			Korea Airports Corporation	Jeju Second International Airport (not decided yet)
Sinan/Heuksando			Korea Airports Corporation	Heuksando Airport
Ulleung			Korea Airports Corporation	Ulleung Airport
**Defunct**
Seoul				Yeouido Airport
Jeju				Altteureu Airfield

== See also ==
- Transportation in South Korea
- Wikipedia: Airline destination lists: Asia
- List of busiest airports in South Korea by passenger traffic
