= List of the busiest airports in South Korea =

This is a list of the busiest airports in South Korea by passengers / year.

== At a glance ==
Annual passenger traffic at ICN GMP PUS TAE YNY CJU USN MWX RSU airports. See Wikidata query.

== 2024 final statistics ==
Rank	Airport	City	Operations (flights)	Passengers	Cargo (metric tons)
1.	Incheon International Airport	Seoul Metro Area	413,200	71,156,947	3,984,100
2.	Jeju International Airport	Jeju	172,752	29,619,606	203,752.9
3.	Gimpo International Airport	Seoul	128,948	22,990,599	188,514.5
4.	Gimhae International Airport	Busan, Ulsan, Gyeongnam	94,870	15,752,458	146,815.6
5.	Cheongju International Airport	Cheongju, Daejeon, Sejong	28,387	4,579,221	28,203.6
6.	Daegu International Airport	Daegu	22,344	3,537,041	25,029
7.	Gwangju Airport	Gwangju	13,557	1,959,258	9,054.1
8.	Wonju Airport	Wonju	1,370	207,163	1,087
9.	Ulsan Airport	Ulsan	3,443	448,746	1,856.5
10.	Pohang Gyeongju Airport	Pohang	2,102	257,009	1,194.4
11.	Muan International Airport	Gwangju, Mokpo	2,699	405,869	4,185.3
12.	Yeosu Airport	Yeosu	5,074	632,818	2,780.8
13.	Sacheon Airport	Jinju	1,755	240,913	690.1
14.	Gunsan Airport	Gunsan	2,030	325,560	1,628.5
15.	Yangyang International Airport	Gangneung, Sokcho	122	17,910	214.5

== 2023 final statistics ==
Rank	Airport	City	Operations (flights)	Passengers	Cargo (metric tons)
1.	Incheon International Airport	Seoul Metro Area	337,299	56,131,064	3,600,288
2.	Jeju International Airport	Jeju	167,086	29,096,271	202,609
3.	Gimpo International Airport	Seoul	134,560	23,424,158	185,570
4.	Gimhae International Airport	Busan, Ulsan, Gyeongnam	82,185	13,694,710	113,703
5.	Cheongju International Airport	Cheongju, Daejeon, Sejong	22,547	3,695,812	20,724
6.	Daegu International Airport	Daegu	20,244	3,302,107	22,077
7.	Gwangju Airport	Gwangju	13,277	2,050,378	9,549
8.	Wonju Airport	Wonju	4,484	599,144	2,558
9.	Ulsan Airport	Ulsan	2,982	380,511	1,552
10.	Pohang Gyeongju Airport	Pohang	2,053	253,703	1,149
11.	Muan International Airport	Gwangju, Mokpo	1,484	233,337	2,724
12.	Yeosu Airport	Yeosu	1,379	205,279	1,080
13.	Sacheon Airport	Jinju	1,490	189,778	475
14.	Gunsan Airport	Gunsan	1,124	172,939	880
15.	Yangyang International Airport	Gangneung, Sokcho	1,233	158,848	1,417

== 2017 final statistics ==
Rank	Airport	City	Passengers
1.	Incheon International Airport	Seoul Metro Area	62,082,032
2.	Jeju International Airport	Jeju	29,604,363
3.	Gimpo International Airport	Seoul	25,101,147
4.	Gimhae International Airport	Busan, Ulsan, Gyeongnam	16,403,541
5.	Daegu International Airport	Daegu	3,560,124
6.	Cheongju International Airport	Cheongju, Daejeon, Sejong	2,571,551
7.	Gwangju Airport	Gwangju	1,946,605
8.	Yeosu Airport	Yeosu	592,509
9.	Ulsan Airport	Ulsan	571,429
10.	Muan International Airport	Gwangju, Mokpo	298,016
11.	Gunsan Airport	Gunsan	225,797
12.	Sacheon Airport	Jinju	178,261
13.	Pohang Airport	Pohang	98,391
14.	Wonju Airport	Wonju	81,560
15.	Yangyang International Airport	Gangneung, Sokcho	15,780

== 2016 final statistics ==
Rank	Airport	City	Passengers
1.	Incheon International Airport	Seoul Metro Area	57,765,397
2.	Jeju International Airport	Jeju	29,707,364
3.	Gimpo International Airport	Seoul	25,043,088
4.	Gimhae International Airport	Busan, Ulsan, Gyeongnam	14,900,815
5.	Cheongju International Airport	Cheongju, Daejeon, Sejong	2,732,755
6.	Daegu International Airport	Daegu	2,533,132
7.	Gwangju Airport	Gwangju	1,613,775
8.	Ulsan Airport	Ulsan	545,321
9.	Yeosu Airport	Yeosu	503,371
10.	Muan International Airport	Gwangju, Mokpo	321,675
11.	Gunsan Airport	Gunsan	232,132
12.	Sacheon Airport	Jinju	150,728
13.	Yangyang International Airport	Gangneung, Sokcho	88,704
14.	Wonju Airport	Wonju	78,567
15.	Pohang Airport	Pohang	68,226

== 2015 final statistics ==
Rank	Airport	City	Passengers
1.	Incheon International Airport	Seoul Metro Area	49,281,210
2.	Jeju International Airport	Jeju	26,237,562
3.	Gimpo International Airport	Seoul	23,163,778
4.	Gimhae International Airport	Busan, Ulsan, Gyeongnam	12,382,150
5.	Cheongju International Airport	Cheongju, Daejeon, Sejong	2,118,492
6.	Daegu International Airport	Daegu	2,027,626
7.	Gwangju Airport	Gwangju	1,604,905
8.	Ulsan Airport	Ulsan	561,411
9.	Yeosu Airport	Yeosu	413,564
10.	Muan International Airport	Gwangju, Mokpo	311,922
11.	Gunsan Airport	Gunsan	205,438
12.	Sacheon Airport	Jinju	136,512
13.	Yangyang International Airport	Gangneung, Sokcho	126,325
14.	Wonju Airport	Wonju	75,146

== 2014 final statistics ==
Rank	Airport	City	Passengers
1.	Incheon International Airport	Seoul / Incheon	45,512,099
2.	Jeju International Airport	Jeju	23,197,796
3.	Gimpo International Airport	Seoul	21,566,946
4.	Gimhae International Airport	Busan	10,378,866
5.	Cheongju International Airport	Cheongju	1,702,538
6.	Daegu International Airport	Daegu	1,537,328
7.	Gwangju Airport	Gwangju	1,332,234
8.	Ulsan Airport	Ulsan	457,060
9.	Yeosu Airport	Yeosu	433,794
10.	Yangyang International Airport	Yangyang	237,538
11.	Muan International Airport	Muan	178,414
12.	Gunsan Airport	Gunsan	154,189
13.	Sacheon Airport	Sacheon / Jinju	124,792
14.	Pohang Airport	Pohang	112,387
15.	Wonju Airport	Wonju / Hoengseong	76,150

== 2013 final statistics ==
Rank	Airport	City	Passengers
1.	Incheon International Airport	Seoul / Incheon	41,482,828
2.	Jeju International Airport	Jeju	20,055,238
3.	Gimpo International Airport	Seoul	19,904,327
4.	Gimhae International Airport	Busan	9,671,381
5.	Cheongju International Airport	Cheongju	1,378,604
6.	Gwangju Airport	Gwangju	1,332,234
7.	Daegu International Airport	Daegu	1,084,585
8.	Yeosu Airport	Yeosu	475,460
9.	Ulsan Airport	Ulsan	473,276
10.	Pohang Airport	Pohang	239,516
11.	Gunsan Airport	Gunsan	175,492
12.	Muan International Airport	Muan	132,603
13.	Sacheon Airport	Sacheon / Jinju	116,106
14.	Wonju Airport	Wonju / Hoengseong	79,716
15.	Yangyang International Airport	Yangyang	38,748

== 2012 final statistics ==
Rank	Airport	City	Passengers
1.	Incheon International Airport	Seoul / Incheon	38,970,864
2.	Gimpo International Airport	Seoul	19,429,224
3.	Jeju International Airport	Jeju	18,443,047
4.	Gimhae International Airport	Busan	9,196,090
5.	Gwangju Airport	Gwangju	1,380,071
6.	Cheongju International Airport	Cheongju	1,308,994
7.	Daegu International Airport	Daegu	1,110,290
8.	Yeosu Airport	Yeosu	632,131
9.	Ulsan Airport	Ulsan	519,849
10.	Pohang Airport	Pohang	262,198
11.	Gunsan Airport	Gunsan	161,009
12.	Sacheon Airport	Sacheon / Jinju	138,195
13.	Muan International Airport	Muan	96,166
14.	Wonju Airport	Wonju / Hoengseong	82,759
15.	Yangyang International Airport	Yangyang	23,354

== 2011 final statistics ==
Rank	Airport	City	Passengers
1.	Incheon International Airport	Seoul / Incheon	35,062,366
2.	Gimpo International Airport	Seoul	18,513,927
3.	Jeju International Airport	Jeju	17,201,878
4.	Gimhae International Airport	Busan	8,749,153
5.	Gwangju Airport	Gwangju	1,375,839
6.	Cheongju International Airport	Cheongju	1,337,791
7.	Daegu International Airport	Daegu	1,178,212
8.	Yeosu Airport	Yeosu	627,350
9.	Ulsan Airport	Ulsan	594,932
10.	Pohang Airport	Pohang	260,050
11.	Gunsan Airport	Gunsan	172,327
12.	Sacheon Airport	Sacheon / Jinju	143,483
13.	Muan International Airport	Muan	91,133
14.	Wonju Airport	Wonju / Hoengseong	72,226
15.	Yangyang International Airport	Yangyang	5,749

== 2010 final statistics ==
Rank	Airport	City	Passengers
1.	Incheon International Airport	Seoul / Incheon	33,478,925
2.	Gimpo International Airport	Seoul	17,565,901
3.	Jeju International Airport	Jeju	15,724,360
4.	Gimhae International Airport	Busan	8,160,546
5.	Gwangju Airport	Gwangju	1,348,847
6.	Cheongju International Airport	Cheongju	1,296,842
7.	Daegu International Airport	Daegu	1,148,953
8.	Ulsan Airport	Ulsan	980,887
9.	Yeosu Airport	Yeosu	657,037
10.	Pohang Airport	Pohang	323,652
11.	Gunsan Airport	Gunsan	174,638
12.	Sacheon Airport	Sacheon / Jinju	160,704
13.	Muan International Airport	Muan	100,021
14.	Wonju Airport	Wonju / Hoengseong	70,522
15.	Yangyang International Airport	Yangyang	8,930

== 2009 final statistics ==
Rank	Airport	City	Passengers
1.	Incheon International Airport	Seoul / Incheon	28,549,770
2.	Gimpo International Airport	Seoul	15,369,944
3.	Jeju International Airport	Jeju	13,643,366
4.	Gimhae International Airport	Busan	6,870,157
5.	Gwangju Airport	Gwangju	1,363,122
6.	Daegu International Airport	Daegu	1,026,203
7.	Cheongju International Airport	Cheongju	1,023,532
8.	Ulsan Airport	Ulsan	1,013,137
9.	Yeosu Airport	Yeosu	613,233
10.	Pohang Airport	Pohang	304,372
11.	Sacheon Airport	Sacheon / Jinju	187,969
12.	Gunsan Airport	Gunsan	156,402
13.	Wonju Airport	Wonju / Hoengseong	74,201
14.	Muan International Airport	Muan	57,716
-	Yangyang International Airport	Yangyang	closed

== 2008 final statistics ==
Rank	Airport	City	Passengers
1.	Incheon International Airport	Seoul / Incheon	29,973,522
2.	Gimpo International Airport	Seoul	14,264,693
3.	Jeju International Airport	Jeju	12,448,084
4.	Gimhae International Airport	Busan	7,202,117
5.	Gwangju Airport	Gwangju	1,380,636
6.	Ulsan Airport	Ulsan	1,130,634
7.	Daegu International Airport	Daegu	1,079,011
8.	Cheongju International Airport	Cheongju	1,042,512
9.	Yeosu Airport	Yeosu	641,690
10.	Pohang Airport	Pohang	267,686
11.	Sacheon Airport	Sacheon / Jinju	204,359
12.	Muan International Airport	Muan	130,014
13.	Gunsan Airport	Gunsan	99,669
14.	Wonju Airport	Wonju / Hoengseong	78,754
15.	Yangyang International Airport	Yangyang	9,312

== 2007 final statistics ==
Rank	Airport	City	Passengers
1.	Incheon International Airport	Seoul / Incheon	31,227,897
2.	Gimpo International Airport	Seoul	13,811,004
3.	Jeju International Airport	Jeju	12,296,426
4.	Gimhae International Airport	Busan	7,403,262
5.	Gwangju Airport	Gwangju	1,539,187
6.	Ulsan Airport	Ulsan	1,207,740
7.	Daegu International Airport	Daegu	1,177,490
8.	Cheongju International Airport	Cheongju	1,032,484
9.	Yeosu Airport	Yeosu	656,022
10.	Pohang Airport	Pohang	297,702
11.	Sacheon Airport	Sacheon / Jinju	214,214
12.	Gunsan Airport	Gunsan	133,242
13.	Wonju Airport	Wonju / Hoengseong	79,102
14.	Yangyang International Airport	Yangyang	35,300
15.	Muan International Airport	Muan	15,223
16.	Mokpo Airport	Mokpo	13,761

== 2006 final statistics ==
Rank	Airport	City	Passengers
1.	Incheon International Airport	Seoul / Incheon	28,191,116
2.	Gimpo International Airport	Seoul	13,766,523
3.	Jeju International Airport	Jeju	12,109,836
4.	Gimhae International Airport	Busan	7,071,037
5.	Gwangju Airport	Gwangju	1,629,787
6.	Ulsan Airport	Ulsan	1,200,072
7.	Daegu International Airport	Daegu	1,194,150
8.	Cheongju International Airport	Cheongju	999,563
9.	Yeosu Airport	Yeosu	601,599
10.	Pohang Airport	Pohang	347,180
11.	Sacheon Airport	Sacheon / Jinju	224,792
12.	Gunsan Airport	Gunsan	155,207
13.	Wonju Airport	Wonju / Hoengseong	80,361
14.	Yangyang International Airport	Yangyang	51,547
15.	Mokpo Airport	Mokpo	16,909

== 2005 final statistics ==
Rank	Airport	City	Passengers
1.	Incheon International Airport	Seoul / Incheon	26,051,466
2.	Gimpo International Airport	Seoul	13,448,152
3.	Jeju International Airport	Jeju	11,354,925
4.	Gimhae International Airport	Busan	7,045,806
5.	Gwangju Airport	Gwangju	1,642,129
6.	Daegu International Airport	Daegu	1,236,446
7.	Ulsan Airport	Ulsan	1,222,110
8.	Cheongju International Airport	Cheongju	857,269
9.	Yeosu Airport	Yeosu	618,217
10.	Pohang Airport	Pohang	464,653
11.	Sacheon Airport	Sacheon / Jinju	315,952
12.	Gunsan Airport	Gunsan	163,779
13.	Wonju Airport	Wonju / Hoengseong	75,514
14.	Yangyang International Airport	Yangyang	60,690
15.	Mokpo Airport	Mokpo	18,582

== 2004 final statistics ==
Rank	Airport	City	Passengers
1.	Incheon International Airport	Seoul / Incheon	24,084,072
2.	Gimpo International Airport	Seoul	14,841,953
3.	Jeju International Airport	Jeju	11,104,341
4.	Gimhae International Airport	Busan	7,674,153
5.	Gwangju Airport	Gwangju	1,879,968
6.	Daegu International Airport	Daegu	1,567,678
7.	Ulsan Airport	Ulsan	1,380,788
8.	Cheongju International Airport	Cheongju	821,259
9.	Pohang Airport	Pohang	659,988
10.	Yeosu Airport	Yeosu	504,353
11.	Sacheon Airport	Sacheon / Jinju	447,231
12.	Gunsan Airport	Gunsan	132,446
13.	Yangyang International Airport	Yangyang	114,342
14.	Wonju Airport	Wonju / Hoengseong	95,422
15.	Mokpo Airport	Mokpo	42,119

== 2003 final statistics ==
Rank	Airport	City	Passengers
1.	Incheon International Airport	Seoul / Incheon	19,789,874
2.	Gimpo International Airport	Seoul	16,880,641
3.	Jeju International Airport	Jeju	10,802,989
4.	Gimhae International Airport	Busan	8,782,835
5.	Daegu International Airport	Daegu	2,228,550
6.	Gwangju Airport	Gwangju	2,081,031
7.	Ulsan Airport	Ulsan	1,395,326
8.	Cheongju International Airport	Cheongju	761,148
9.	Pohang Airport	Pohang	645,494
10.	Sacheon Airport	Sacheon / Jinju	518,115
11.	Yeosu Airport	Yeosu	510,530
12.	Yangyang International Airport	Yangyang	194,539
13.	Gunsan Airport	Gunsan	150,635
14.	Mokpo Airport	Mokpo	117,661
15.	Wonju Airport	Wonju / Hoengseong	58,355
16.	Yecheon Air Base	Yecheon	19,043

== 2002 final statistics ==
Rank	Airport	City	Passengers
1.	Incheon International Airport	Seoul / Incheon	20,924,171
2.	Gimpo International Airport	Seoul	17,092,095
3.	Jeju International Airport	Jeju	9,939,700
4.	Gimhae International Airport	Busan	9,173,288
5.	Daegu International Airport	Daegu	2,274,901
6.	Gwangju Airport	Gwangju	2,129,521
7.	Ulsan Airport	Ulsan	1,383,733
8.	Pohang Airport	Pohang	704,467
9.	Cheongju International Airport	Cheongju	634,066
10.	Sacheon Airport	Sacheon / Jinju	544,860
11.	Yeosu Airport	Yeosu	544,044
12.	Yangyang International Airport	Yangyang	217,115
13.	Mokpo Airport	Mokpo	174,281
14.	Gunsan Airport	Gunsan	152,254
15.	Gangneung Airbase	Gangneung	67,355
16.	Yecheon Air Base	Yecheon	32,379
17.	Wonju Airport	Wonju / Hoengseong	29,621
18.	Sokcho Airport	Sokcho	9,539

== 2001 final statistics ==
Rank	Airport	City	Passengers
1.	Gimpo International Airport	Seoul	22,041,099
2.	Incheon International Airport	Seoul/ Incheon	14,542,290
3.	Jeju International Airport	Jeju	9,320,337
4.	Gimhae International Airport	Busan	9,168,089
5.	Gwangju Airport	Gwangju	2,234,855
6.	Daegu International Airport	Daegu	2,214,613
7.	Ulsan Airport	Ulsan	1,387,574
8.	Sacheon Airport	Sacheon / Jinju	815,014
9.	Pohang Airport	Pohang	774,029
10.	Yeosu Airport	Yeosu	618,465
11.	Cheongju International Airport	Cheongju	606,108
12.	Gangneung Airbase	Gangneung	409,683
13.	Mokpo Airport	Mokpo	288,169
14.	Gunsan Airport	Gunsan	244,573
15.	Yecheon Air Base	Yecheon	86,293
16.	Sokcho Airport	Sokcho	76,167
17.	Wonju Airport	Wonju / Hoengseong	73,491

== 2000 final statistics ==
Rank	Airport	City	Passengers
1.	Gimpo International Airport	Seoul	36,637,067
2.	Gimhae International Airport	Busan	9,358,152
3.	Jeju International Airport	Jeju	9,125,939
4.	Gwangju Airport	Gwangju	2,381,551
5.	Daegu International Airport	Daegu	2,241,310
6.	Ulsan Airport	Ulsan	1,377,000
7.	Sacheon Airport	Sacheon / Jinju	880,492
8.	Pohang Airport	Pohang	801,607
9.	Yeosu Airport	Yeosu	669,385
10.	Cheongju International Airport	Cheongju	528,726
11.	Gangneung Airbase	Gangneung	515,249
12.	Mokpo Airport	Mokpo	337,667
13.	Gunsan Airport	Gunsan	270,789
14.	Sokcho Airport	Sokcho	134,185
15.	Yecheon Air Base	Yecheon	133,273
16.	Wonju Airport	Wonju / Hoengseong	84,403

== 1999 final statistics ==
Rank	Airport	City	Passengers
1.	Gimpo International Airport	Seoul	33,284,079
2.	Gimhae International Airport	Busan	8,388,401
3.	Jeju International Airport	Jeju	8,242,134
4.	Gwangju Airport	Gwangju	2,367,585
5.	Daegu International Airport	Daegu	2,086,436
6.	Ulsan Airport	Ulsan	1,285,591
7.	Sacheon Airport	Sacheon / Jinju	858,237
8.	Pohang Airport	Pohang	789,973
9.	Yeosu Airport	Yeosu	654,309
10.	Gangneung Airbase	Gangneung	564,669
11.	Mokpo Airport	Mokpo	372,235
12.	Cheongju International Airport	Cheongju	353,728
13.	Gunsan Airport	Gunsan	258,005
14.	Sokcho Airport	Sokcho	225,342
15.	Yecheon Air Base	Yecheon	169,615
16.	Wonju Airport	Wonju / Hoengseong	86,196

== 1998 final statistics ==
Rank	Airport	City	Passengers
1.	Gimpo International Airport	Seoul	29,296,342
2.	Gimhae International Airport	Busan	7,600,329
3.	Jeju International Airport	Jeju	7,469,980
4.	Gwangju Airport	Gwangju	2,171,783
5.	Daegu International Airport	Daegu	1,799,531
6.	Ulsan Airport	Ulsan	1,205,112
7.	Pohang Airport	Pohang	784,983
8.	Sacheon Airport	Sacheon / Jinju	764,670
9.	Yeosu Airport	Yeosu	684,289
10.	Gangneung Airbase	Gangneung	626,893
11.	Mokpo Airport	Mokpo	377,139
12.	Sokcho Airport	Sokcho	319,734
13.	Cheongju International Airport	Cheongju	299,904
14.	Gunsan Airport	Gunsan	287,950
15.	Yecheon Air Base	Yecheon	217,088
16.	Wonju Airport	Wonju / Hoengseong	87,278

== 1997 final statistics ==
Rank	Airport	City	Passengers
1.	Gimpo International Airport	Seoul	36,489,214
2.	Gimhae International Airport	Busan	9,958,559
3.	Jeju International Airport	Jeju	9,819,129
4.	Gwangju Airport	Gwangju	2,861,998
5.	Daegu International Airport	Daegu	2,173,183
6.	Ulsan Airport	Ulsan	1,691,279
7.	Pohang Airport	Pohang	1,124,781
8.	Yeosu Airport	Yeosu	981,661
9.	Sacheon Airport	Sacheon / Jinju	966,727
10.	Gangneung Airbase	Gangneung	900,448
11.	Gunsan Airport	Gunsan	456,926
12.	Sokcho Airport	Sokcho	437,157
13.	Yecheon Air Base	Yecheon	390,154
14.	Cheongju International Airport	Cheongju	370,743
15.	Mokpo Airport	Mokpo	298,496
16.	Wonju Airport	Wonju / Hoengseong	121,944

== See also ==
- List of airports in South Korea
- List of airports by ICAO code: R#RK - South Korea
