= Hi Air =

Regional airline of South Korea

Hi Air 하이에어
| IATA | ICAO | Call sign |
|---|---|---|
| 4H | HGG | HI AIR |
- Founded: December 22, 2017; 8 years ago
- Commenced operations: December 13, 2019
- Ceased operations: August 31, 2023
- Hubs: Ulsan Airport
- Focus cities: Gimpo International Airport
- Fleet size: 4
- Destinations: 5
- Key people: HyungKwan Youn
- Website: hi-airlines.com

Hi Air Co., Ltd (Korean: 하이에어), operating as Hi Air, was a regional airline in South Korea that was founded in 2017 and began operations in December 2019.

== History ==
The airline's first route started was between Ulsan and Seoul. In June 2020, it purchased two ATR 72-500 aircraft from ATR in order to expand its network with five new routes, despite the global slump in air travel caused by the COVID-19 pandemic. The airline suspended all flights on 31 August 2023. However, in February 2025, the Seoul Bankruptcy Court appproved the rehabilitation plan of Hi Air, preparing for relaunch.

== Destinations ==
| Country | City | Airport | Notes | Refs |
|---|---|---|---|---|
| Japan | Kitakyushu | Kitakyushu Airport | | |
| South Korea | Jeju | Jeju International Airport | | |
| South Korea | Muan | Muan International Airport | | |
| South Korea | Sacheon | Sacheon Airport | | |
| South Korea | Seoul | Gimpo International Airport | | |
| South Korea | Ulsan | Ulsan Airport | Hub | |
| South Korea | Yangyang | Yangyang International Airport | | |

== Fleet ==
As of March 2023, the Hi Air fleet consisted of the following aircraft:

Hi Air fleet
| Aircraft | In Fleet | Order | Seats | Notes |
|---|---|---|---|---|
| ATR 72-500 | 4 | 2 | 50 | Orders were second hand units from ATR |

== See also ==
- Transport in South Korea
- List of companies of South Korea
- List of airlines of South Korea
