= Jin Air =

Low-cost airline of South Korea

- Jin Air Boeing 737-800
IATA	ICAO	Call sign
LJ	JNA	JIN AIR
- Founded: January 23, 2008; 18 years ago
- Commenced operations: April 5, 2008; 18 years ago
- Hubs: Seoul–Gimpo; Seoul–Incheon
- Focus cities: Busan; Jeju
- Fleet size: 31
- Destinations: 45
- Parent company: Korean Air
- Traded as: KRX: 272450
- Headquarters: Gangseo-gu, Seoul, South Korea
- Key people: Park Byung-Ryul (CEO)
- Website: www.jinair.com

Jin Air Co., Ltd. (Korean: 진에어; RR: Jin E-eo) is a South Korean low-cost airline. As of April 2018, it operates flights to six domestic cities and 26 international destinations. It launched its first long haul route, between Incheon and Honolulu, in December 2015. It has operated cargo services since November 2013. Jin Air is the first widebody LCC operator in Korea.

In 2018, Jin Air was South Korea's second-largest low-cost carrier, carried 3.5 million domestic and 5.4 million international passengers, and accounted for an 11% share of the domestic market and a 6% share of the international market. Jin Air's domestic traffic was also lower over the preceding three years because it has focused on the international market.

== History ==
Jin Air is headquartered in Deungchon-dong, Gangseo-gu, Seoul. The name "Jin Air" was officially announced on June 15, 2008, at an opening ceremony in Seoul. It began operations in July 2008 with routes to regional destinations in South Korea. The inaugural flight was between Seoul's Gimpo International Airport and Jeju International Airport on July 17, 2008, using a Boeing 737-800. In December 2009, Jin Air began its first scheduled international flights to Bangkok.

Jin Air was the third and last company to join the Korea Exchange (KRX) by way of an initial public offering (IPO) in 2017, alongside Studio Dragon and TissueGene. On October 30, 2017, the KRX announced that Jin Air passed the IPO preliminary approval. Jin Air had its IPO on December 8, 2017.

On 20 February 2021, United Airlines Flight 328, operated by a Boeing 777 powered by PW4077-112 engines suffered a fan blade failure shortly after takeoff. This was the third such incident with the Boeing 777 in three years and the fifth PW4000 series engine turbine blade failure in service. CAA, FAA, and JCAB grounded all Boeing 777 aircraft with PW4000 engines following advice from Boeing. All carriers had complied with the mandatory groundings or done so voluntarily with the exception of Jin Air's four 777-200ER aircraft until the FAA issued a further airworthiness directive 4 days later. On 12 June 2022, Jin Air returned its first 777 to scheduled service.

In December 2024, it was reported that Korean Air will merge Air Busan, Air Seoul and Jin Air, to be wholly or partly owned and rebranded as Jin Air.

== Destinations ==
As of August 2026, Jin Air flies (or has flown) to the following destinations:

Country	City	Airport	Notes	Refs
Australia	Cairns	Cairns Airport	Terminated	
Australia	Gold Coast	Gold Coast Airport ^{Charter}	Terminated	
China	Changsha	Changsha Huanghua International Airport ^{Charter}	Terminated	
China	Chengdu	Chengdu Shuangliu International Airport ^{Charter}	Terminated	
China	Chongqing	Chongqing Jiangbei International Airport ^{Charter}	Terminated	
China	Dalian	Dalian Zhoushuizi International Airport ^{Charter}	Terminated	
China	Fuzhou	Fuzhou Changle International Airport ^{Charter}	Terminated	
China	Guilin	Guilin Liangjiang International Airport		
China	Guiyang	Guiyang Longdongbao International Airport ^{Charter}	Terminated	
China	Hangzhou	Hangzhou Xiaoshan International Airport ^{Charter}	Terminated	
China	Harbin	Harbin Taiping International Airport ^{Charter}	Terminated	
China	Hefei	Hefei Xinqiao International Airport ^{Charter}	Terminated	
China	Hohhot	Hohhot Baita International Airport ^{Charter}	Terminated	
China	Jiamusi	Jiamusi Dongjiao Airport ^{Charter}	Terminated	
China	Lanzhou	Lanzhou Zhongchuan International Airport ^{Charter}	Terminated	
China	Mudanjiang	Mudanjiang Hailang International Airport ^{Charter}	Terminated	
China	Nanchang	Nanchang Changbei International Airport ^{Charter}	Terminated	
China	Nanjing	Nanjing Lukou International Airport ^{Charter}	Terminated	
China	Nanning	Nanning Wuxu International Airport ^{Charter}	Terminated	
China	Ningbo	Ningbo Lishe International Airport ^{Charter}	Terminated	
China	Qingdao	Qingdao Jiaodong International Airport		
China	Qingdao	Qingdao Liuting International Airport	Airport closed	
China	Shanghai	Shanghai Pudong International Airport		
China	Shijiazhuang	Shijiazhuang Zhengding International Airport ^{Charter}	Terminated	
China	Taiyuan	Taiyuan Wusu International Airport ^{Charter}	Terminated	
China	Tianjin	Tianjin Binhai International Airport ^{Charter}	Terminated	
China	Wenzhou	Wenzhou Longwan International Airport ^{Charter}	Terminated	
China	Wuxi	Wuxi Shuofang Airport	Terminated	
China	Xiamen	Xiamen Gaoqi International Airport ^{Charter}	Terminated	
China	Xi'an	Xi'an Xianyang International Airport		
China	Yanji	Yanji Chaoyangchuan International Airport ^{Charter}	Terminated	
China	Yantai	Yantai Penglai International Airport		
China	Yichang	Yichang Sanxia International Airport		
China	Yinchuan	Yinchuan Hedong International Airport ^{Charter}	Terminated	
China	Zhengzhou	Zhengzhou Xinzheng International Airport		
Guam	Hagåtña	Antonio B. Won Pat International Airport		
Hong Kong	Hong Kong	Hong Kong International Airport		
Japan	Fukuoka	Fukuoka Airport		
Japan	Ibaraki	Ibaraki Airport ^{Charter}	Terminated	
Japan	Ishigaki	New Ishigaki Airport		
Japan	Kitakyushu	Kitakyushu Airport		
Japan	Kobe	Kobe Airport		
Japan	Kushiro	Kushiro Airport ^{Charter}	Terminated	
Japan	Miyazaki	Miyazaki Airport ^{Charter}	Terminated	
Japan	Nagoya	Chubu Centrair International Airport		
Japan	Naha	Naha Airport		
Japan	Niigata	Niigata Airport ^{Charter}	Terminated	
Japan	Osaka	Kansai International Airport		
Japan	Saga	Saga Airport ^{Charter}	Terminated	
Japan	Sapporo	New Chitose Airport		
Japan	Shimojishima	Shimojishima Airport		
Japan	Takamatsu	Takamatsu Airport		
Japan	Tokyo	Narita International Airport		
Laos	Vientiane	Wattay International Airport	Seasonal	
Macau	Macau	Macau International Airport	Suspended	
Malaysia	Johor Bahru	Senai International Airport	Terminated	
Malaysia	Kota Kinabalu	Kota Kinabalu International Airport		
Mongolia	Ulaanbaatar	Chinggis Khaan International Airport		
Northern Mariana Islands	Saipan	Saipan International Airport	Terminated	
Philippines	Cebu	Mactan–Cebu International Airport		
Philippines	Clark	Clark International Airport		
Philippines	Kalibo	Kalibo International Airport	Suspended	
Philippines	Tagbilaran	Bohol–Panglao International Airport		
South Korea	Busan	Gimhae International Airport		
South Korea	Cheongju	Cheongju International Airport		
South Korea	Daegu	Daegu International Airport		
South Korea	Gunsan	Gunsan Airport		
South Korea	Gwangju	Gwangju Airport		
South Korea	Jeju	Jeju International Airport		
South Korea	Muan	Muan International Airport		
South Korea	Pohang	Pohang Gyeongju Airport		
South Korea	Sacheon	Sacheon Airport		
South Korea	Seoul	Gimpo International Airport	Hub	
South Korea	Seoul	Incheon International Airport	Hub	
South Korea	Ulsan	Ulsan Airport		
South Korea	Wonju	Wonju Airport		
South Korea	Yangyang	Yangyang International Airport	Terminated	
South Korea	Yeosu	Yeosu Airport		
Taiwan	Taichung	Taichung International Airport		
Taiwan	Taipei	Taoyuan International Airport		
Thailand	Bangkok	Suvarnabhumi Airport		
Thailand	Chiang Mai	Chiang Mai International Airport		
Thailand	Pattaya	U-Tapao International Airport ^{Charter}	Terminated	
Thailand	Phuket	Phuket International Airport	Seasonal	
United States	Honolulu	Daniel K. Inouye International Airport	Terminated	
Vietnam	Da Nang	Da Nang International Airport		
Vietnam	Hanoi	Noi Bai International Airport		
Vietnam	Nha Trang	Cam Ranh International Airport		
Vietnam	Phu Quoc	Phu Quoc International Airport		

=== Codeshare agreements ===
- Air Busan
- Jetstar
- Korean Air

=== Interline agreements ===
- Delta Air Lines
- Jetstar

== Fleet ==
=== Current fleet ===
As of August 2026, Jin Air operates the following aircraft:

Jin Air fleet
Aircraft	In service	Orders	Passengers				Notes
Aircraft	In service	Orders	J	W	Y	Total	Notes
Airbus A321-200	1	—	12	—	162	174	Taken over from Asiana Airlines in 2026.
Airbus A321neo	—	10	TBA				
Boeing 737-800	19	—	—	—	183	183	
Boeing 737-800	19	—	—	—	189	189	
Boeing 737-900	3	3	8	—	180	188	
Boeing 737 MAX 8	5	—	—	—	189	189	
Boeing 777-200ER	3	—	—	48	345	393	
Total	31	13					

=== Retired fleet ===
Jin Air previously operated the following aircraft:

Jin Air retired fleet
Aircraft	Total	Introduced	Retired	Notes
Boeing 737-800	10	2008	2022	Former Korean Air aircraft.
Boeing 777-200ER	1	2015	2026	Former Korean Air aircraft.
