= JDG =

JDG or Jdg may refer to:

== People ==
- Julian de Guzman (born 1981), Canadian association football player
- Jordan De Goey (born 1996), Australian-rules football player
- Jack Dylan Grazer (born 2003), American actor

== Publications ==
- Book of Judges, of the Hebrew Bible
- Journal of Differential Geometry, an academic journal
- Journal de Genève, Swiss newspaper (1826–1998)

== Other uses ==
- Judge—as a title
- JD Gaming, a Chinese esports organization
- Jeongseok Airport, South Korea (IATA:JDG)
- Jadgali language, spoken in Iran and Pakistan (ISO 639-3:jdg)
