= Naksan Beach =

Beach in Yangyang County, Gangwon Province, South Korea

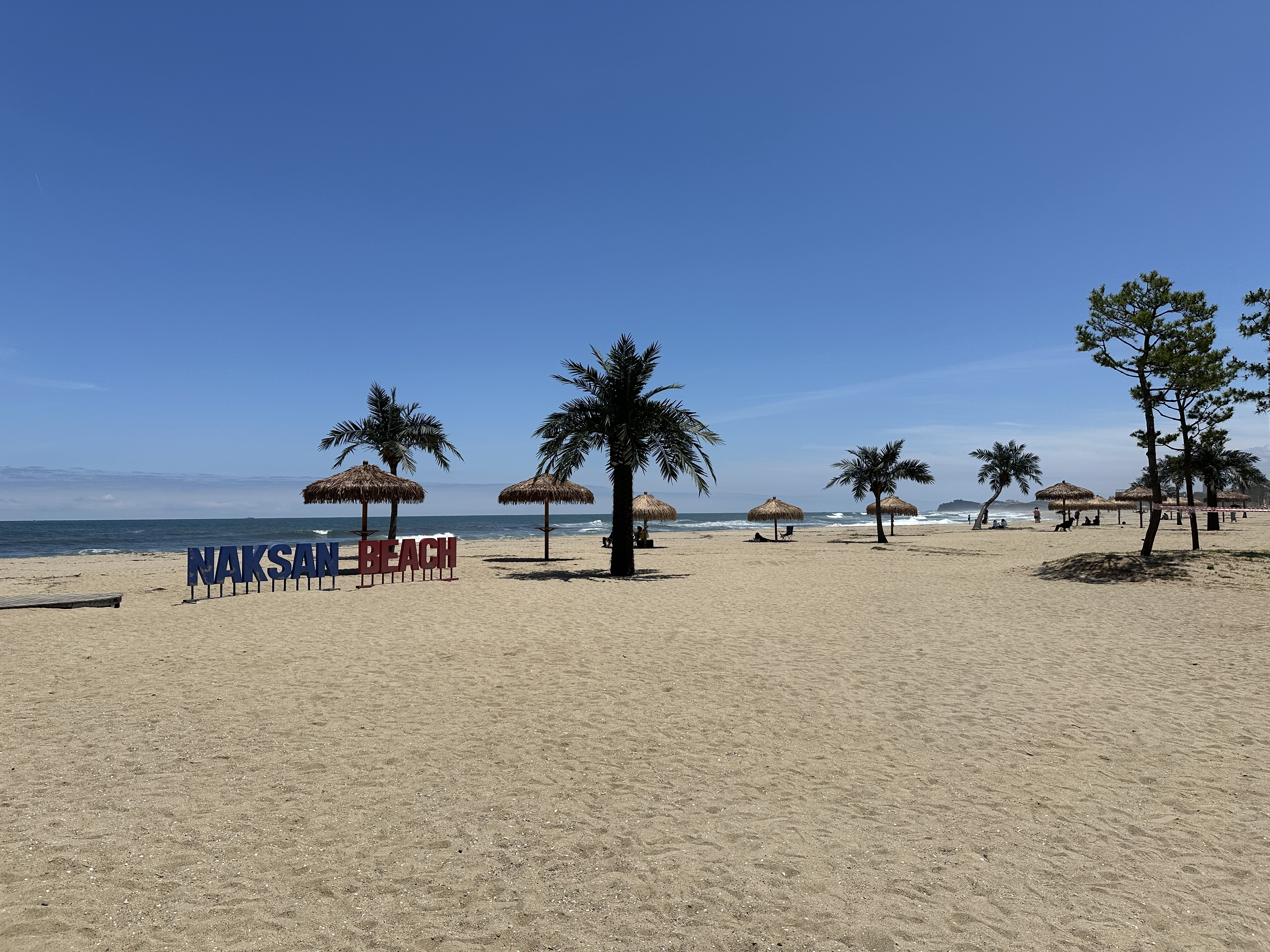
- Main section of the beach (2026)
- Interactive map of Naksan Beach
- Coordinates: 38.1179°N 128.6338°E
- Location: Yangyang County, Gangwon Province, South Korea
- Website: naksan-beach.co.kr

Korean name
- Hangul: 낙산해수욕장
- RR: Naksan haesuyokjang
- MR: Naksan haesuyokchang

Naksan Beach (Korean: 낙산해수욕장) is a beach in Yangyang County, Gangwon Province, South Korea. It first opened to the public on July 22, 1962. In 1979, it was made part of Naksan Provincial Park (낙산도립공원). The park's status was dissolved in 2016. The beach is 1,180m long.

A road infrastructure project for the beach was finished in June 2026.

== Gallery ==
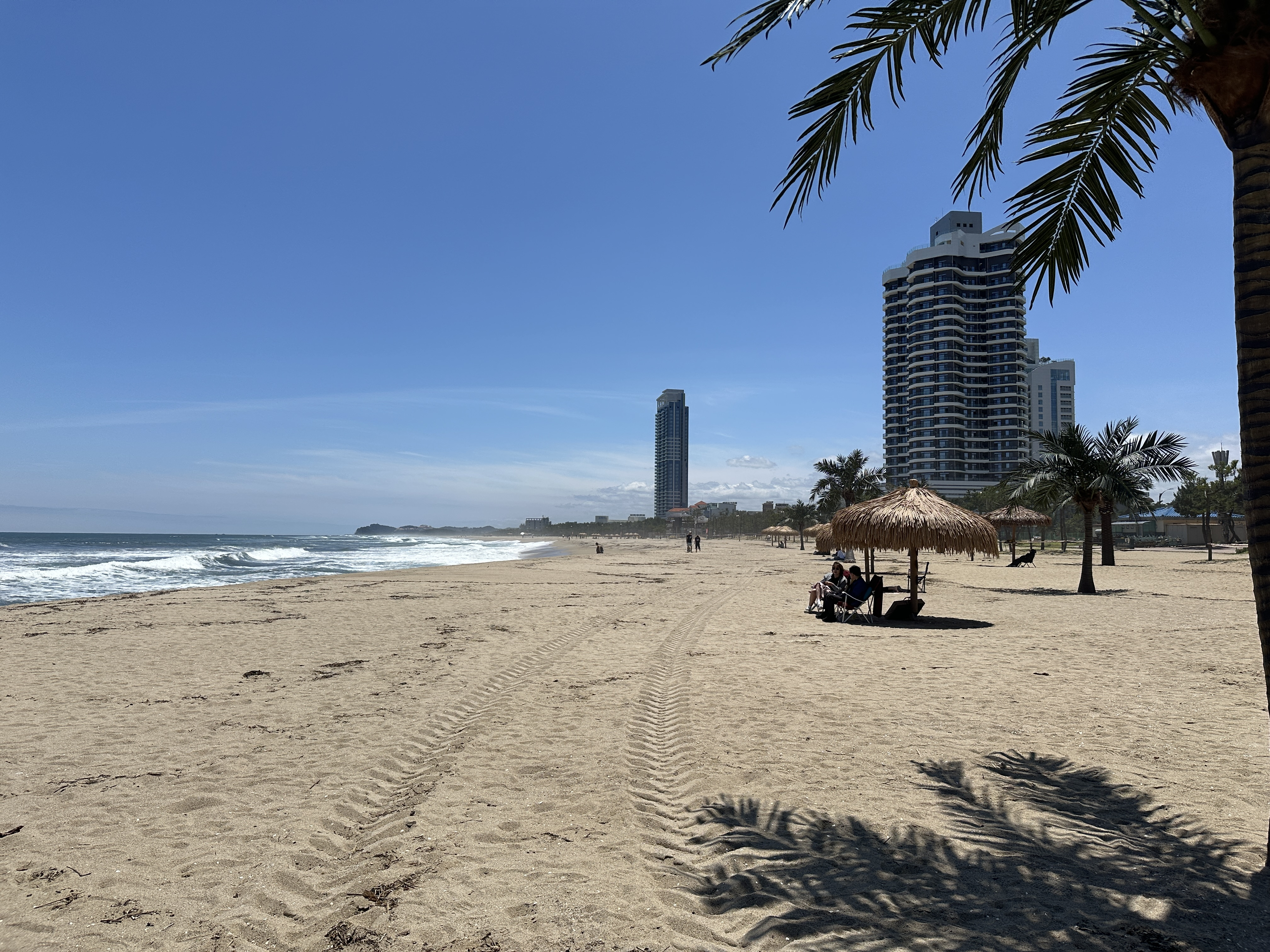
View to the south (2026)

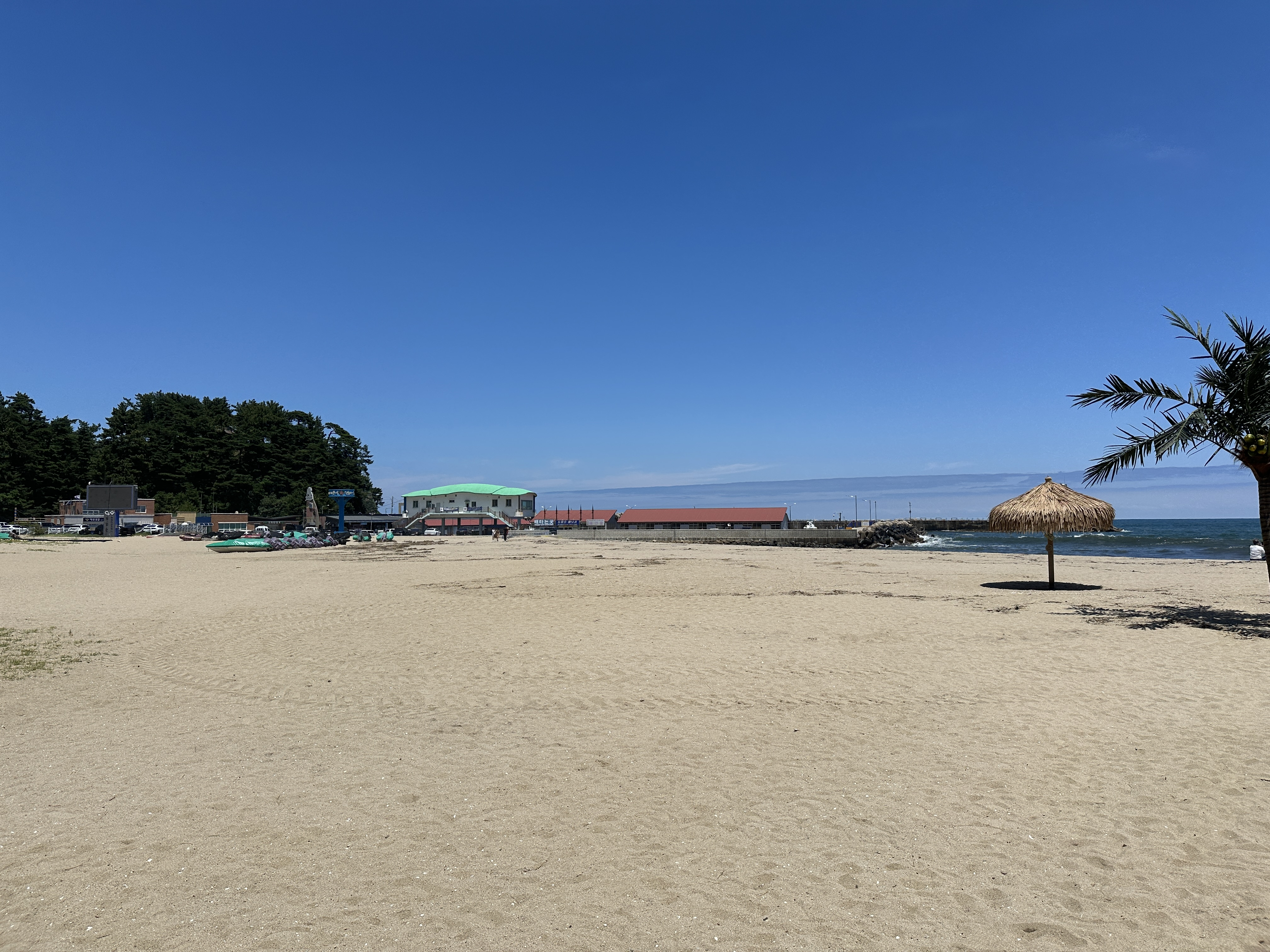
View to the north (2026)

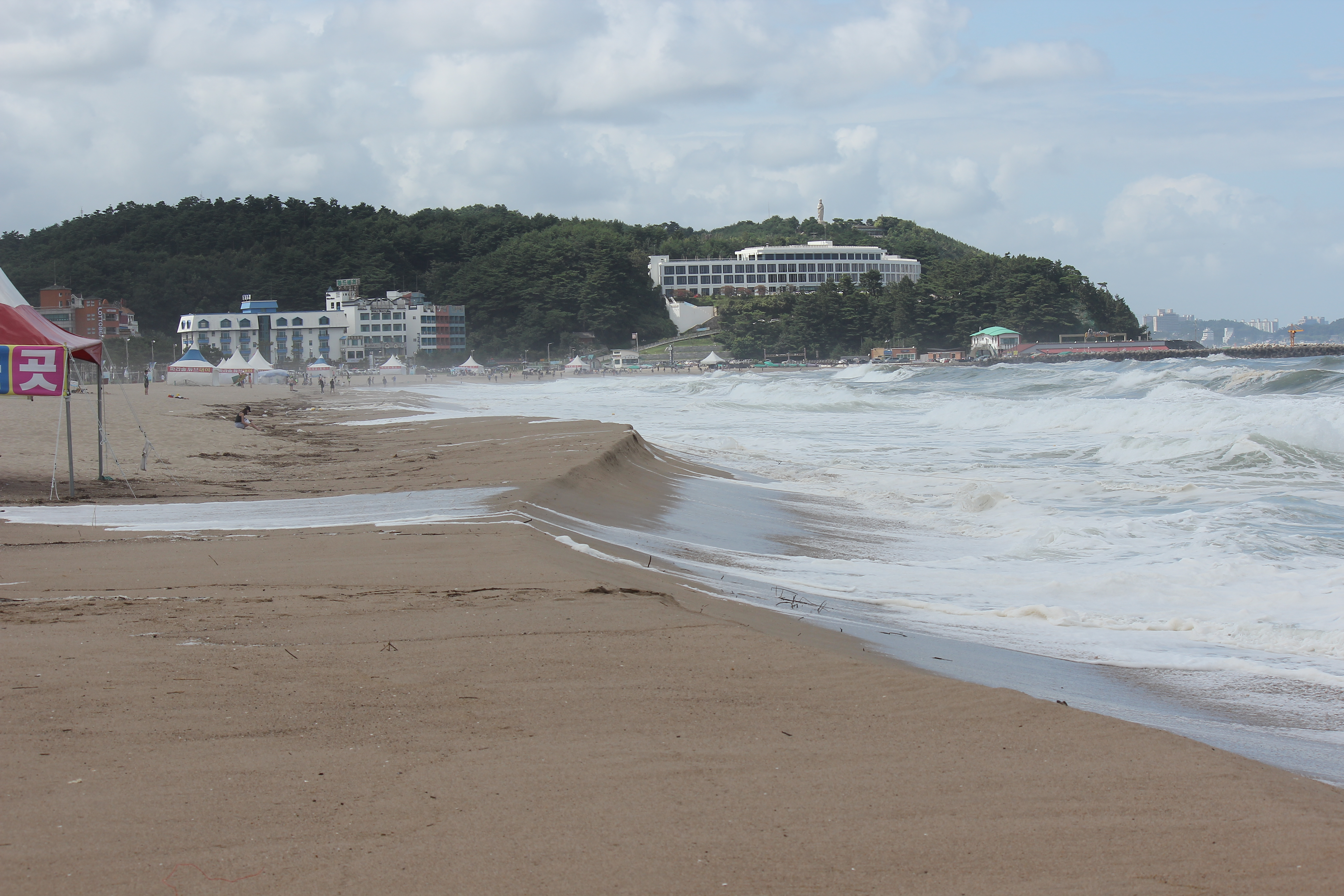
Waves on the beach (2018)
