= 1971 Korean Air Lines Fokker F27 hijacking =

1971 aircraft hijacking in South Korea

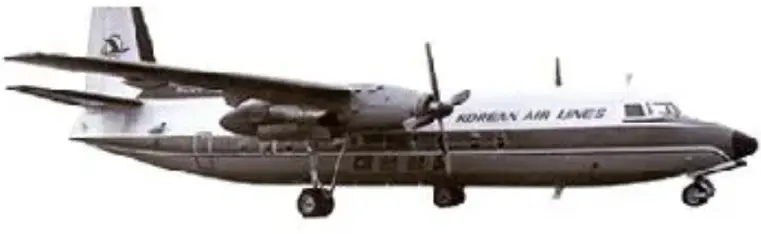
- HL5212, the aircraft involved, seen on the day of the hijacking

Hijacking
- Date: 23 January 1971
- Summary: Hijacking attempt; grenade explosion in cockpit; forced landing
- Site: Near Sokcho, Gangwon Province, South Korea; 38°13′57″N 128°34′58″E

Aircraft
- Aircraft type: Fokker F27-200 Friendship
- Operator: Korean Air Lines
- Registration: HL5212
- Flight origin: Sokcho Airport, Gangwon, South Korea
- Destination: Seoul–Gimpo Airport, Seoul, South Korea
- Occupants: 60 (including hijacker)
- Passengers: 55 (including hijacker)
- Crew: 5
- Fatalities: 2 (including hijacker)
- Injuries: 16
- Survivors: 58

On January 23, 1971, a domestic passenger flight from Sokcho Airport to Seoul–Gimpo International Airport that became the target of a hijacking attempt. Shortly after takeoff, a North Korean sympathizer armed with a hand grenade attempted to divert the aircraft to North Korea. During a struggle in the cockpit, the grenade detonated, killing the hijacker and the co-pilot, and injuring several others. Despite severe damage to the cockpit, the captain—later identified as one of Korean Air’s senior pilots—managed to make an emergency crash-landing on a beach near Sokcho, Gangwon Province, saving the majority of the 50 passengers and crew on board.

The incident was one of the earliest failed hijacking attempts in South Korea’s aviation history and highlighted the country’s tense security climate during the Cold War. Later retrospectives described the event as a remarkable act of airmanship, as the captain managed to bring the aircraft safely down on the shoreline with minimal loss of life.

== Background ==
The aircraft involved in the incident was a Fokker F27-200 Friendship. 55 passengers and 5 crew members were on board. Captain Lee Gang-heun (이강흔) was the pilot-in-command. He was reported to be about 37 years old at the time of the incident. The co-pilot, Jeon Myeong-se (전명세; also romanized Chon Myong-se), aged 39, was one of two fatalities. Born on 10 February 1932 in Yongcheong, Manchuria, Jeon served as an anti-communist guerrilla fighter during the Korean War and was honorably discharged as a lieutenant colonel in May 1970 after receiving twenty commendations for military service. He was posthumously awarded the Order of Civil Merit, First Class, and buried at the Seoul National Cemetery.

The hijacker, Kim Sang-tae (김상태), was a 22 year old male passenger who attempted to hijack the aircraft using a grenade and was killed when it detonated. Sang-tae managed to board the flight with the bomb on despite strengthened security checks.

== Accident ==
The flight left Sokcho Airport for Seoul-Gimpo at 1:07pm. 27 minutes after takeoff, at 1:34pm and while flying 10,000 feet (3,048m) over Hongcheon, two hand grenades exploded. Shortly after they exploded, Captain Kang-hun radioed to the ground that the plane had been hijacked.

The explosion created a large hole in the aircraft and shattered the locked cockpit door, allowing Sang-tae to enter the cockpit with two more grenades, ordering the pilots to turn north. Captain Kang-heun decided to make an emergency landing at Gosung-gun, Gangwon-do, but Sang-tae, realizing the flight was approaching the beach of Hwajinpo, threatened to throw the grenades lest the pilots continue on their journey.

After learning of the hijacking, the Republic of Korea Air Force sent two F-5A fighter jets to surround the Fokker F-27, preventing it from reaching North Korea. They reached the plane when it was close to the Military Demarcation Line. while cabin crew member Choi Seok-ja and aviation security officer Choi Cheon-il attempted to trick Sang-tae into thinking the passengers were panicking. Captain Kang-hun distracted Sang-tae by telling him the fighter was a North Korean MiG, allowing Cheon-il and trainee pilot Jeon Myeong-se to shoot and kill Sang-tae. The grenade dropped to the ground; Myeong-se covered it with his body, minimizing the damage from the explosion. However, he lost his left arm and right leg, suffering serious injuries as a result.

Shortly after the bomb exploded, pressurization was lost and the cabin and control systems were damaged. Captain Kang-hun made a rough emergency landing at the beach in Chodo-ri, Hyeon-nae-myeon, Goseon-gun at 2:18pm - an hour and 11 minutes after takeoff. Out of the 16 injuries that were reported, eight, including that of Myeong-se, were serious. He received emergency treatment at a military hospital, then was transported to Seoul. His will said that he "threw [him]self because [he] was afraid the passengers would get hurt." He died due to excessive blood loss.

== In popular culture ==
The events of the crash were dramatized in the 2024 film Hijack 1971.

== See also ==
- United Airlines Flight 93 — hijacked during the September 11 attacks; the hijackers were stopped by passengers, and the aircraft crashed before reaching its intended target.
- Iraqi Airways Flight 163 — cockpit explosion and crash due to hijackers with grenades.
- Ethiopian Airlines Flight 708 — attempted hijacking with fatalities.
- Vietnam Civil Aviation Flight 501 — A similar hijacking incident in Vietnam, which occurred in 1978
- United Airlines Flight 696 — hijacking resolved without major damage or fatalities.
- Korean Air NAMC YS 11 hijacking - Another Korean Air hijacking which landed in North Korea
