= Jeongseok Airport =

Airport in Seogwipo, Jeju, South Korea

Jeongseok / Jungseok Airport
- IATA: JDG; ICAO: RKPD

Summary
- Airport type: Private
- Owner/Operator: Korean Air
- Serves: Jeju
- Elevation AMSL: 1,174 ft / 358 m
- Coordinates: 33°23′49″N 126°42′46″E
- Website: www.airport.co.kr/doc/jeju_eng/

Map
- Location of airport in South Korea

Runways
| Direction | Length | | Surface |
| Direction | m | ft | Surface |
|---|---|---|---|
| 01/19 | 2,315 | 7,589 | Asphalt |
| 15/33 | 1,516 | 4,974 | Asphalt |
- Sources: World Aero Data; Korea Airports CorporationDAFIF

Jeongseok Airport (IATA: JDG, ICAO: RKPD) is a small airport located near the city of Seogwipo, in Jeju province in South Korea. The airport is owned by Korean Air and is used as an aviation training centre. The name of the airport originated from the art name of Cho Choong-hoon, the founder of Hanjin Group.

== See also ==
- Transportation in South Korea
- Busiest airports in South Korea by passenger traffic
