= Gunsan Airport =

Airport in Gunsan, North Jeolla Province, South Korea

Gunsan Airport 군산공항
- IATA: KUV; ICAO: RKJK

Summary
- Airport type: Public / Military
- Owner: Ministry of Land, Infrastructure and Transport
- Operator: Korea Airports Corporation; Republic of Korea Air Force; United States Air Force
- Serves: Gunsan
- Location: Gunsan, North Jeolla Province, South Korea
- Opened: August 1970; 55 years ago
- Elevation AMSL: 29 ft / 9 m
- Coordinates: 35°55′33.46″N 126°36′56.4″E
- Website: www.airport.co.kr/gunsaneng

Map
- Location of airport in South Korea

Runways
Direction	Length		Surface
Direction	m	ft	Surface
18/36	2,743	9,000	Concrete

Statistics (2019)
- Aircraft movements: 1,955
- Passengers: 306,518
- Cargo Tonnage: 1,614
- Sources: airport.kr.com, Korea Airports Corp.

- Gunsan Airport
- Hangul: 군산공항
- Hanja: 群山空港
- RR: Gunsan gonghang
- MR: Kunsan konghang

Gunsan Airport (IATA: KUV, ICAO: RKJK) is an airport serving Gunsan, a city in the North Jeolla Province in South Korea. In 2019, 306,518 passengers used the airport. It shares its runway with Kunsan Air Base, which uses the same IATA and ICAO codes. Because Gunsan Airport is a shared civilian / military facility, photography of the apron, runway and military facility is strictly prohibited.

== History ==
The routes between Seoul and Gunsan were opened in August 1970, but the airport was closed in 1974 due to the first oil shock, but the construction of the civil harbor facility started in November 1991 and reopened on December 14, 1992. On December 14, 1992, Korean Air (Korean Air) opened a new route to Seoul, Gunsan, Gunsan, and Jeju Island and was operated by Asiana Airlines in June 1996, but Asiana Airlines was suspended from service in October 2001. Since November 1992, it has been managed by the Gunsan Branch of the Korea Airport Corporation. As of 2004, the Gunsan - Jeju route will be operated.

== Facilities ==
The airport is at an elevation of 29 feet (8.8 m) above mean sea level. It has one runway designated 18/36 with a concrete surface measuring 9,000 by 150 feet (2,743.2 m × 45.7 m).

== Airlines and destinations ==
Airlines	Destinations
Eastar Jet	Jeju
Jin Air	Jeju

== Statistics ==
Air traffic statistics
	Aircraft operations	Passenger volume	Cargo tonnage
2001	3,151	244,573	2,588
2002	1,728	152,254	2,259
2003	1,388	150,635	2,138
2004	1,366	132,446	1,724
2005	1,366	163,779	1,648
2006	1,194	155,207	1,944
2007	1,109	133,242	1,571
2008	782	99,669	1,456
2009	1,324	156,402	1,543
2010	1,387	174,638	1,610
2011	1,398	172,327	1,633
2012	1,350	161,009	1,485
2013	1,444	175,492	1,451
2014	1,205	154,189	1,046
2015	1,432	205,438	1,301
2016	1,427	232,132	1,320
2017	1,420	225,797	1,267
2018	1,798	291,941	1,636
2019	1,955	306,518	1,674
2020	1,012	109,800	551
2021	2,404	280,197	1,430
2022	2,681	409,738	2,101
2023	1,124	172,939	880
Source: Korea Airports Corporation Traffic Statistics

== See also ==
- Kunsan Air Base
