= Jeju International Airport =

Airport serving Jeju Island, South Korea

Jeju International Airport 제주국제공항

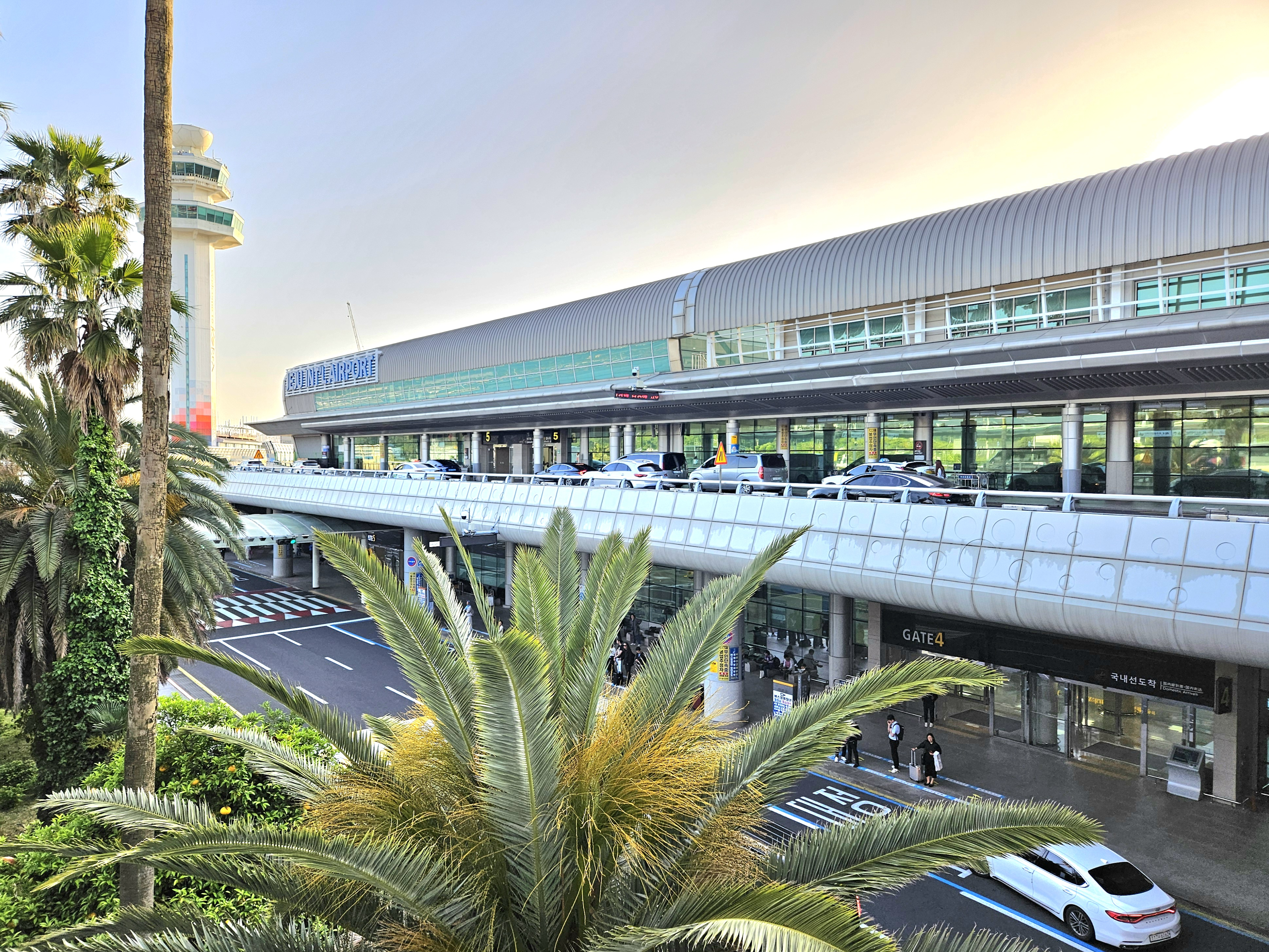
- IATA: CJU; ICAO: RKPC

Summary
- Airport type: Public
- Owner: Ministry of Land, Infrastructure and Transport
- Operator: Korea Airports Corporation
- Serves: Jeju Island
- Location: Jeju City, Jeju Province, South Korea
- Opened: 26 April 1968; 58 years ago
- Focus city for: Asiana Airlines; Korean Air
- Operating base for: Eastar Jet; Jeju Air; Jin Air
- Elevation AMSL: 36 m (118 ft)
- Coordinates: 33°30′41″N 126°29′35″E
- Website: www.airport.co.kr/jejueng

Map
- Location of airport in South Korea

Runways
Direction	Length		Surface
Direction	m	ft	Surface
07/25	3,180	10,433	Asphalt
13/31	1,910	6,266	Asphalt

Statistics (2019)
- Aircraft movements: 175,366
- Passengers: 31,316,394
- Tonnes of cargo: 258,847
- Sources: World Aero Data; Korea Airports Corporation

- Jeju International Airport
- Hangul: 제주국제공항
- Hanja: 濟州國際空港
- RR: Jeju gukjegonghang
- MR: Cheju kukchegonghang

Jeju International Airport (IATA: CJU, ICAO: RKPC) also known as Jeju Island Airport is the second-largest airport in South Korea, just behind Incheon International Airport in Incheon near Seoul. It serves as the home base for Jeju Air, and is located in Jeju City.

== Operations ==
Jeju International Airport, which opened in 1968, serves many mainland destinations in South Korea, as well as international destinations in mainland China, Hong Kong, Japan, Taiwan, Thailand, Malaysia and Singapore. In 2015, 26,237,562 passengers used the airport. The airport is one endpoint of the world's busiest airline route, Jeju to/from Seoul-Gimpo. In 2023 over 13.7 million passengers traveled on that route.

Due to the airport operating far beyond its designed passenger capacity, it was announced in 2023 that Jeju's second airport would be constructed in Seongsan-eup, near the southern city of Seogwipo. This US$5.1 billion project has faced significant delays and controversies due to concerns the airport would negatively impact Jeju's groundwater sources, as well as protected species living in the area.

== Airlines and destinations ==
Airlines	Destinations
Aero K	Cheongju
Air Busan	Busan, Seoul–Gimpo, Ulsan
Air China	Beijing–Capital, Wenzhou
Air Seoul	Seoul–Gimpo
Asiana Airlines	Cheongju, Daegu, Gwangju, Seoul–Gimpo, Yeosu
Beijing Capital Airlines	Hangzhou
China Eastern Airlines	Shanghai–Pudong
China Southern Airlines	Dalian, Guangzhou (resumes 19 December 2026), Harbin
China United Airlines	Wenzhou
Eastar Jet	Busan, Cheongju, Gunsan, Seoul–Gimpo, Shanghai–Pudong, Taipei–Taoyuan
HK Express	Hong Kong
Jeju Air	Beijing–Capital, Beijing–Daxing, Busan, Cheongju, Daegu, Gwangju, Hong Kong, Seoul–Gimpo, Seoul–Incheon, Xi'an
Jin Air	Busan, Cheongju, Daegu, Gunsan, Gwangju, Hong Kong, Pohang–Gyeongju, Seoul–Gimpo, Shanghai–Pudong, Taipei–Taoyuan, Ulsan, Wonju, Yeosu; Seasonal: Xi'an
Juneyao Air	Nanjing, Shanghai–Pudong, Wuxi
Korean Air	Beijing–Capital, Busan, Cheongju, Daegu, Gwangju, Sacheon, Seoul–Gimpo, Tokyo–Narita, Ulsan, Yeosu
Loong Air	Hangzhou
Parata Air	Seoul–Gimpo, Yangyang
Philippine Airlines	Seasonal charter: Manila
Qingdao Airlines	Qingdao
Scoot	Singapore
Shenzhen Airlines	Shenzhen
Spring Airlines	Beijing–Daxing, Guangzhou, Hangzhou, Nanjing, Ningbo, Shanghai–Pudong, Shenyang, Tianjin
Tigerair Taiwan	Kaohsiung, Taichung, Taipei–Taoyuan
Trinity Airways	Cheongju, Daegu, Fukuoka, Gwangju, Kaohsiung, Osaka–Kansai, Seoul–Gimpo, Singapore, Taipei–Taoyuan
West Air	Zhengzhou

== Statistics ==
Due to the popularity of Jeju as a holiday spot in South Korea, the air route from Jeju to Seoul is the busiest airline route in the world. In 2019, there were 85,000 flights from eight different airlines, meanwhile, 17 million seats were sold on flights between Gimpo and Jeju.

As Jeju has gained popularity as a resort destination, the number of international visitors from China, Malaysia, Thailand, and Japan has increased. In 1997, Jeju airport handled nine million passengers. In 2019, the airport passed the 30 million milestone despite being designed to handle a maximum of 26 million passengers. In 2020, the number of international visitors dropped due to COVID-19. However, the Seoul-Jeju route remained the busiest in the world and flight delays are still common.

In 2019, the Ministry of Land, Infrastructure, and Transport announced a US$4.18 billion construction plan that would begin in 2021 near Seogwipo City in southern Jeju. The airport would take 50% of the domestic flights to Jeju and would help to transfer flights during bad weather. The airport would accommodate 18.98 million passengers per year. However, in 2021 the Ministry of Environment cancelled the plans due to their failure to protect the local environment, including Jeju's extensive groundwater reserves, and protected species in the area, such as the narrow-mouthed frog. A new US$5.1 billion airport plan was provisionally approved in 2023 with no project completion date set.

=== Traffic by calendar year ===
Traffic by calendar year
	Passenger volume	Change over previous year	Aircraft operations	Cargo tonnage
1997	9,819,129		63,134	287,204
1998	7,469,980	▼23.9%	50,979	275,899
1999	8,242,134	▲10.3%	49,978	290,168
2000	9,125,939	▲10.7%	55,675	320,633
2001	9,320,337	▲2.1%	60,597	329,895
2002	9,939,700	▲6.6%	68,681	337,750
2003	10,802,989	▲8.7%	77,069	339,498
2004	11,104,341	▲2.8%	76,075	327,325
2005	11,354,925	▲2.3%	73,556	317,839
2006	12,109,836	▲6.6%	78,611	315,129
2007	12,296,426	▲1.5%	93,073	288,453
2008	12,448,084	▲1.2%	95,671	225,479
2009	13,643,366	▲9.6%	99,323	240,253
2010	15,724,360	▲15.3%	103,426	231,287
2011	17,201,878	▲9.4%	112,696	251,975
2012	18,443,047	▲7.2%	120,699	244,647
2013	20,055,238	▲8.7%	130,454	237,328
2014	23,197,796	▲15.7%	145,533	275,429
2015	26,237,562	▲13.1%	158,691	278,718
2016	29,707,364	▲13.2%	172,742	291,494
2017	29,604,363	▼0.35%	167,280	275,129
2018	29,455,305	▼0.5%	168,331	266,370
2019	31,316,394	▲6.3%	175,366	258,847
2020	21,054,696	▼32.8%	138,256	171,385
2021	25,802,550	▲22.6%	160,230	188,926
2022	29,703,662	▲15.1%	169,624	210,962
2023	29,096,271	▼2.0%	167,086	202,609
Source: Korea Airports Corporation Traffic Statistics

=== Domestic traffic by route ===
Domestic traffic by route (2024)
Rank	Airport	Passengers	Carriers
1	Seoul–Gimpo	15,278,561	Air Busan, Air Seoul, Asiana Airlines, Eastar Jet, Jeju Air, Jin Air, Korean Air, T'way Air
2	Busan	3,514,193	Air Busan, Eastar Jet, Jeju Air, Jin Air, Korean Air
3	Cheongju	3,110,536	Aero K, Asiana Airlines, Eastar Jet, Jeju Air, Jin Air, Korean Air, T'way Air
4	Daegu	2,076,334	Asiana Airlines, Jeju Air, Jin Air, Korean Air, T'way Air
5	Gwangju	1,801,580	Asiana Airlines, Jeju Air, Jin Air, Korean Air, T'way Air
6	Yeosu	375,677	Asiana Airlines, Jin Air, Korean Air
7	Gunsan	325,560	Eastar Jet, Jin Air
8	Wonju	207,163	Jin Air
9	Pohang–Gyeongju	197,012	Jin Air
10	Ulsan	167,462	Jin Air, Korean Air

=== Busiest international routes ===
Busiest international routes from Jeju (2024)
Rank	Airport	Passengers	Carriers
1	Shanghai–Pudong	839,619	China Eastern Airlines, Jin Air, Juneyao Air, Spring Airlines
2	Taipei–Taoyuan	304,679	Eastar Jet, Tigerair Taiwan, T'way Air
3	Hangzhou	195,287	Beijing Capital Airlines, Loong Air, Spring Airlines
4	Beijing–Daxing	163,805	Jeju Air, Spring Airlines
5	Nanjing	145,875	Juneyao Air, Spring Airlines
6	Osaka–Kansai	127,779	T'way Air
7	Hong Kong	122,208	HK Express, Jeju Air
8	Beijing–Capital	117,554	Air China, Korean Air
9	Singapore	99,908	Scoot
10	Ningbo	83,896	Spring Airlines

== Accidents and incidents ==
- 5 February 1982: A Republic of Korea Air Force Fairchild C-123 Provider crashed 2.3 miles N of Hallasan Volcano while on approach to land at Jeju in bad weather. All 53 occupants (six crew, 47 army troops) were killed.
- 10 August 1994: Korean Air Flight 2033, an Airbus A300-600R (registered as HL7296) overran the runway while attempting to land at Jeju International Airport. The plane was arriving from Seoul. All 160 persons on board survived.
- 28 July 2011: Asiana Airlines Flight 991, a Boeing 747-400F (registered as HL7604) experienced an in-flight fire and crashed while attempting to divert to Jeju. The plane was en route from Incheon to Shanghai. Both pilots were killed.

== See also ==
- Alddreu Airfield
- List of the busiest airports in South Korea
- List of airports in South Korea
- List of airports by ICAO code – South Korea
- Transport in South Korea
