= Yecheon Air Base =

Airbase in South Korea

- IATA: YEC; ICAO: RKTY

Summary
- Airport type: Military
- Owner/Operator: Republic of Korea Air Force
- Location: Yecheon
- Elevation AMSL: 354 ft (108 m)
- Coordinates: 36°37′55″N 128°21′18″E

Map
- Location in South Korea

Runways
Direction	Length		Surface
Direction	ft	m	Surface
10/28	9,000	2,743	Concrete
- Sources: World Aero Data

Yecheon Air Base (IATA: YEC, ICAO: RKTY) is a military airport located in Yecheon, South Korea.

The base is home to the Republic of Korea Air Force (ROKAF) 16th Fighter Wing.

On 22 September 2026 the first production KAI KF-21 Boramae was delivered to the ROKAF 156th Fighter Squadron at the base.

== See also ==
- List of airports in South Korea
