= Yeosu Airport =

Airport in Yeosu, South Jeolla, South Korea

Yeosu Airport 여수공항
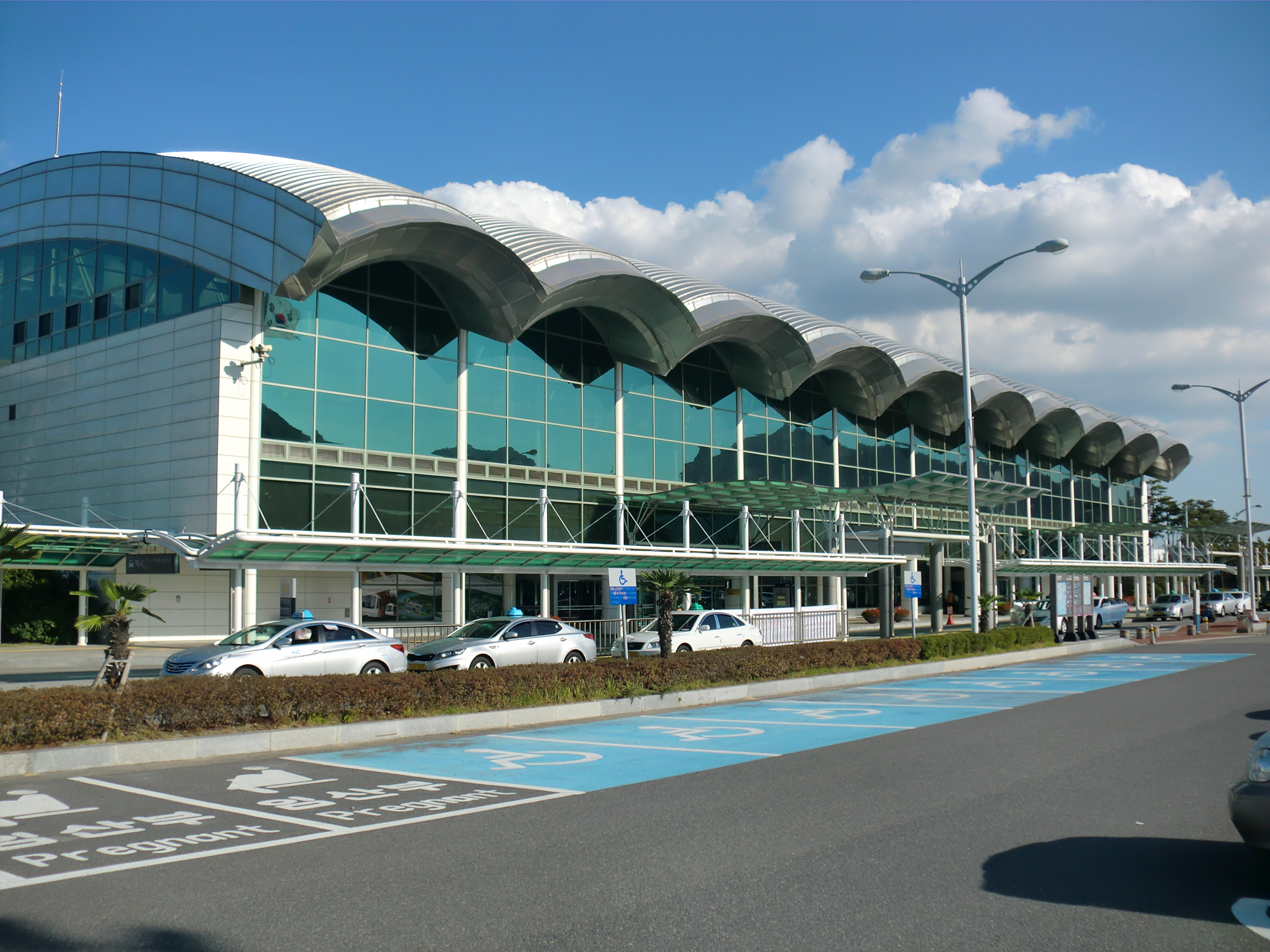
- IATA: RSU; ICAO: RKJY

Summary
- Airport type: Public
- Owner: Ministry of Land, Infrastructure and Transport
- Operator: Korea Airports Corporation
- Serves: Yeosu
- Location: Yeosu, South Jeolla Province, South Korea
- Opened: 23 May 1972; 54 years ago
- Elevation AMSL: 15 m (49 ft)
- Coordinates: 34°50′32.38″N 127°37′0″E
- Website: www.airport.co.kr/yeosueng

Map
- Location of airport in South Korea

Runways
Direction	Length		Surface
Direction	m	ft	Surface
17/35	2,100	6,890	Asphalt

Statistics (2019)
- Passengers: 635,637
- Aircraft Movements: 5,002
- Cargo Tonnage: 2,856
- Source:airport.kr.com

- Yeosu Airport
- Hangul: 여수공항
- Hanja: 麗水空港
- RR: Yeosu gonghang
- MR: Yŏsu konghang

Yeosu Airport (IATA: RSU, ICAO: RKJY) is an airport in Yeosu, South Jeolla Province, South Korea . In 2018, 590,112 passengers used the airport.

== Airlines and destinations ==
Airlines	Destinations
Asiana Airlines	Jeju, Seoul–Gimpo
Jin Air	Jeju, Seoul–Gimpo
Korean Air	Jeju

== Statistics ==
Air traffic statistics
	Aircraft operations	Passenger volume	Cargo tonnage
2001	7,642	618,465	2,741
2002	7,232	544,044	2,451
2003	7,068	510,530	2,382
2004	6,376	504,353	2,266
2005	6,821	618,217	2,480
2006	6,053	601,599	2,401
2007	6,120	656,022	2,713
2008	5,837	641,690	2,582
2009	5,707	613,233	2,468
2010	5,658	657,037	2,604
2011	5,803	627,350	2,620
2012	6,028	632,131	2,607
2013	5,836	475,460	2,063
2014	5,667	433,794	2,052
2015	5,476	413,564	1,993
2016	4,813	503,371	2,190
2017	5,046	592,509	2,774
2018	4,987	590,112	2,864
2019	5,002	635,637	2,859
2020	5,846	646,884	2,123
2021	8,149	1,115,699	3,062
2022	7,072	1,010,333	3,359
2023	4,484	599,144	2,558
Source: Korea Airports Corporation Traffic Statistics

== Ground transportation ==
=== City Bus ===
- No. 31, 32, 33, 34, 35, 96
