= Sacheon Airport =

Airport in Sacheon, South Korea

Sacheon Airport 사천공항
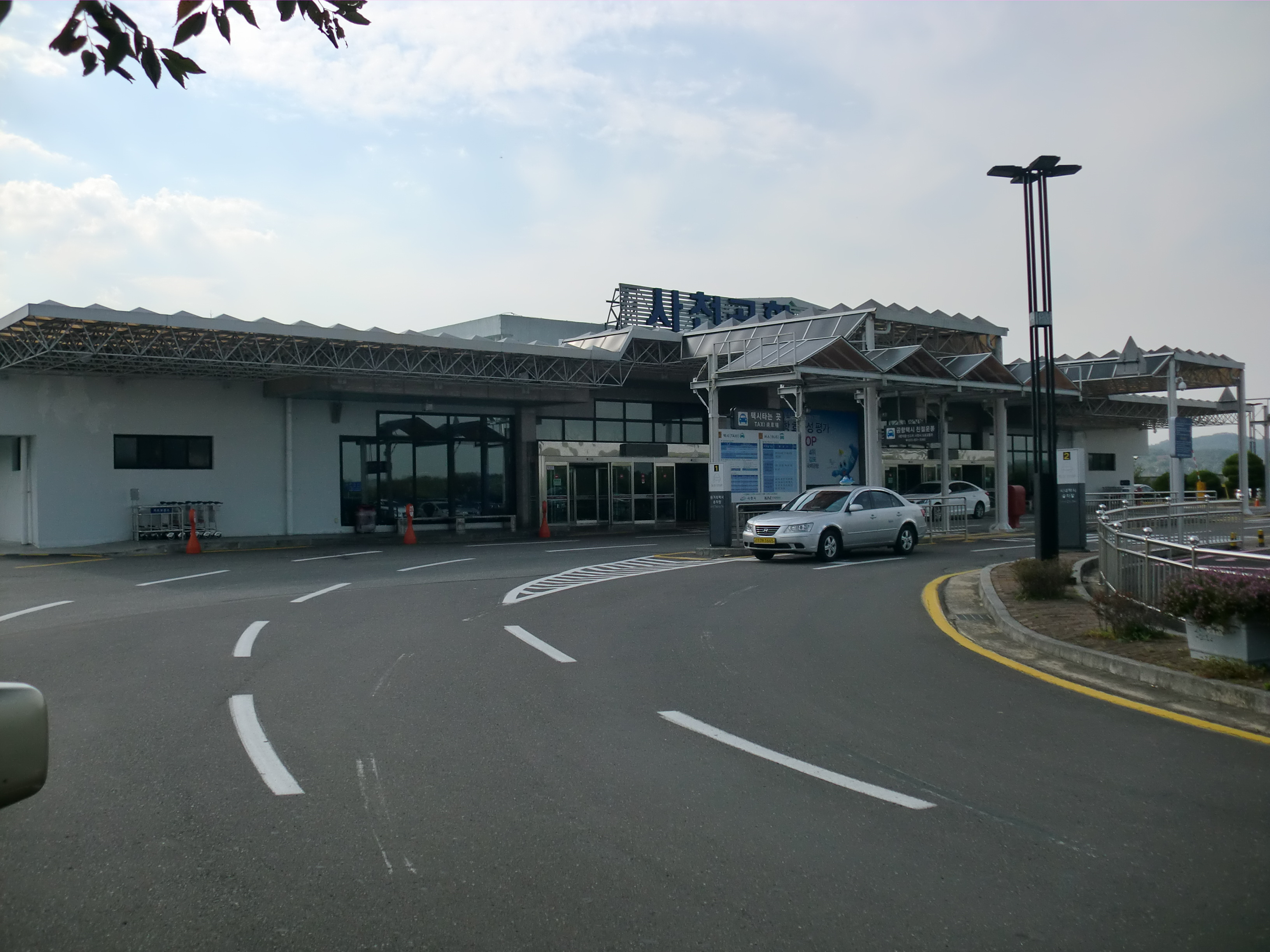
- IATA: HIN; ICAO: RKPS

Summary
- Airport type: Public / Military
- Owner: Ministry of Land, Infrastructure and Transport
- Operator: Korea Airports Corporation; Republic of Korea Air Force
- Serves: Sacheon; Jinju
- Location: Sacheon, South Gyeongsang Province, South Korea
- Opened: 1977; 49 years ago
- Built: 1 November 1969; 56 years ago
- Elevation AMSL: 8 m / 26 ft
- Coordinates: 35°05′18.75″N 128°04′13.33″E
- Website: www.airport.co.kr/sacheoneng

Map
- Location of airport in South Korea

Runways
| Direction | Length | | Surface |
| Direction | m | ft | Surface |
|---|---|---|---|
| 06R/24L | 2,743 | 9,000 | Concrete |
| 06L/24R | 2,743 | 9,000 | Concrete |

Statistics (2019)
- Passengers: 219,289
- Aircraft Movements: 1,937
- Cargo Tonnage: 867
- Source:airport.kr.com

- Sacheon Airport
- Hangul: 사천공항
- Hanja: 泗川空港
- RR: Sacheon gonghang
- MR: Sach'ŏn konghang

Sacheon Airport (IATA: HIN, ICAO: RKPS) is an airport in Sacheon, South Gyeongsang Province, South Korea . It also serves the city of Jinju. The airport passenger service began in 1977 after years of delays. The airport has a small single storey terminal building for domestic flights. In 2011, 143,483 passengers utilized the airport. The airport serves as a base for Hi Air and is also the home of Korea Aerospace Industries, which manufactures military aircraft, and satellites. The T-50 trainers used by the Sacheon Air Base are manufactured by the company on the north side of the airport. Because Sacheon Airport is shared with the military, taking photographs or videos of the apron, runway or military facilities are strictly prohibited.

== History ==
=== Korean War ===
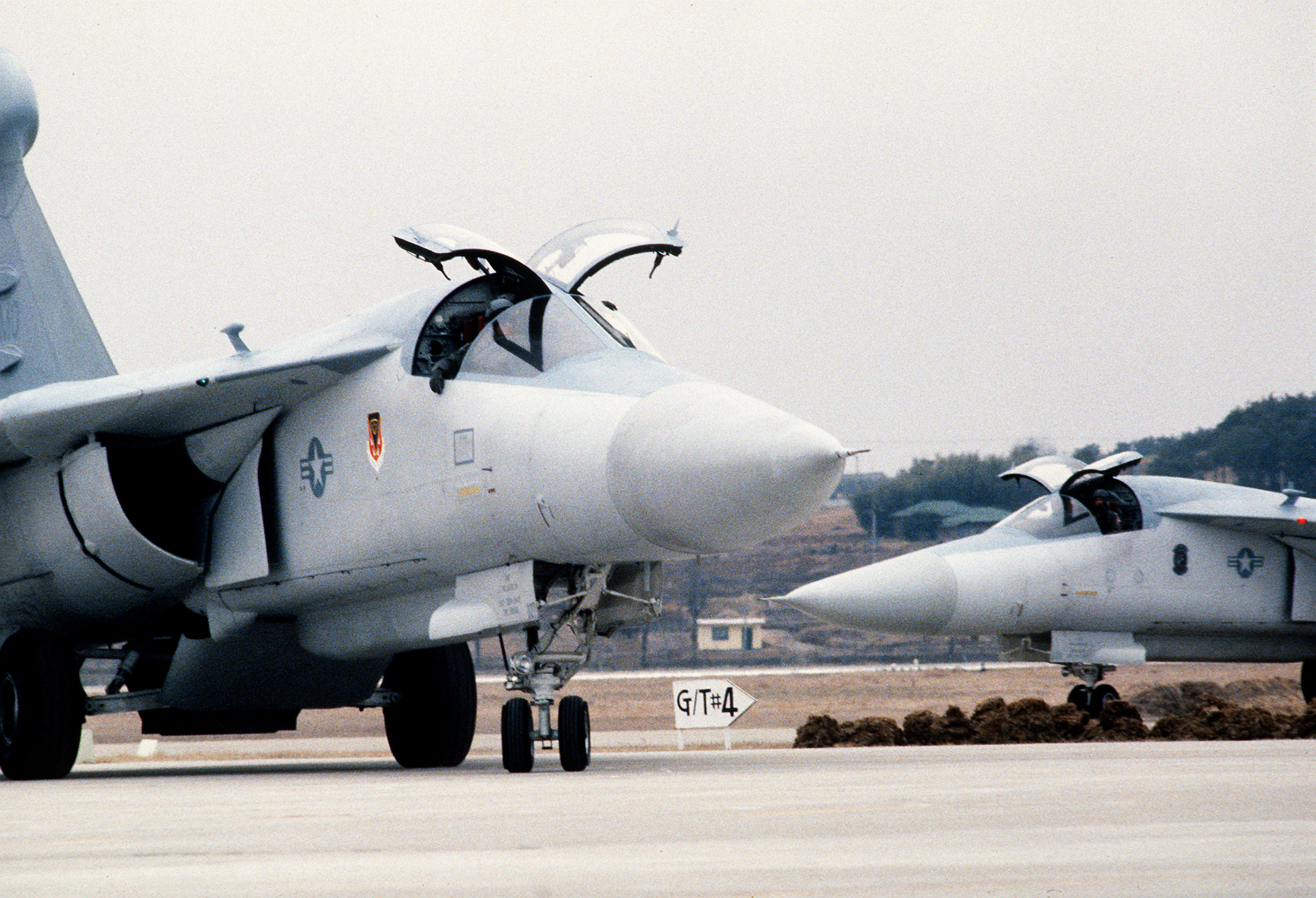
Two 366th Tactical Fighter Wing EF-111 Ravens taxi at Sacheon during Exercise Team Spirit '85

During the Korean War the USAF designated the base K-4. The Base was used as part of the USAF's Bout One project to train South Korean pilots to fly the F-51 in 1950. The ROKAF 10th Fighter Wing was formed at the base in 1951.

=== Postwar ===
The Republic of Korea Air Force operates from Sacheon using trainers and testbed aircraft at Jinju, which is home to the Republic of Korea Air Force Education and Training Command since 1998. Hangars for the trainers are found on the north and south sides of the airport.

- 3rd Flight Training Wing
  - 213th Flight Training Squadron
  - 215th Flight Training Squadron
  - 217th Flight Training Squadron
  - 236th Flight Training Squadron
- Air Force Test & Evaluation Wing (formerly 52nd Test Evaluation Group)
  - 281st Flight Test Squadron
- Air Force Basic Military Training Wing
- Air Force Aviation Science High School
- Air Force 1st Logistics School (formerly Air Force Technical School)
- Air Force 2nd Logistics School (formerly Air Force Technical School)

== Airlines and destinations ==
| Airlines | Destinations |
|---|---|
| Jin Air | Seoul–Gimpo |
| Korean Air | Jeju |
| SUM Air | Seoul–Gimpo |

== Statistics ==
There was an error rendering the chart.

Air traffic statistics
| | Aircraft operations | Passenger volume | Cargo tonnage |
|---|---|---|---|
| 2001 | 6,965 | 815,014 | 3,630 |
| 2002 | 6,485 | 544,860 | 2,900 |
| 2003 | 6,314 | 518,115 | 2,770 |
| 2004 | 4,865 | 447,231 | 2,887 |
| 2005 | 3,311 | 315,952 | 1,913 |
| 2006 | 2,442 | 224,792 | 1,582 |
| 2007 | 2,235 | 214,214 | 1,246 |
| 2008 | 2,322 | 204,359 | 1,156 |
| 2009 | 2,358 | 187,969 | 958 |
| 2010 | 1,983 | 160,704 | 786 |
| 2011 | 1,826 | 143,483 | 716 |
| 2012 | 1,788 | 138,195 | 653 |
| 2013 | 1,714 | 116,106 | 604 |
| 2014 | 1,802 | 124,792 | 631 |
| 2015 | 1,814 | 136,512 | 658 |
| 2016 | 1,822 | 150,728 | 700 |
| 2017 | 1,869 | 178,261 | 761 |
| 2018 | 1,912 | 182,686 | 812 |
| 2019 | 1,937 | 219,289 | 867 |
| 2020 | 320 | 27,433 | 114 |
| 2021 | 2 | 105 | 0 |
| 2022 | 1,350 | 139,657 | 320 |
| 2023 | 1,490 | 189,778 | 475 |
Source: Korea Airports Corporation Traffic Statistics

== Transportation ==
Besides private cars and taxi, the airport is connected by buses(No.75 and No.95) to Jinju and Sacheon. The airport is accessed via Gonghangdero Expressway.

== See also ==
- KAI Aerospace Museum
