= Gangneung Air Base =

Military airport in Gangwon, South Korea

Gangneung Air Base 강릉공항
- IATA: KAG; ICAO: RKNN

Summary
- Airport type: Military
- Owner/Operator: Republic of Korea Air Force
- Location: Gangneung, Gangwon, South Korea
- Passenger services ceased: 2 April 2002
- Elevation AMSL: 11 m (36 ft)
- Coordinates: 37°45′12″N 128°56′37″E

Map
- Location within South Korea Location within Asia Location within North Pacific Location within Earth

Runways
| Direction | Length | | Surface |
| Direction | m | ft | Surface |
|---|---|---|---|
| 08/26 | 2,743 | 9,000 | Concrete |
- Source: DAFIF

Gangneung Air Base (IATA: KAG, ICAO: RKNN) is an airbase holding the 18th fighter wing of the Republic of Korea Air Force. It is located in Gangneung, Gangwon Province, South Korea. The airfield has one runway (08/26), and is ILS equipped on runway 23. In the past, this airfield also used to handle civilian air traffic. The passenger handling functions of this airfield were closed prior to the opening of Yangyang International Airport.

== History ==
During the Korean War, the USAF designated the base as K-18.

In 1969, Korean Air Lines YS-11 flying from Gangneung Airbase to Gimpo International Airport in Seoul was hijacked by a North Korean agent and forced to land in the North; seven of the passengers and all four crew members among them did not return to South Korea.

On 5 October 2022, due to the failed ballistic missile test, a major explosion occurred at the air base.
