= Korea Airports Corporation =

South Korean air transport company

- Logo
- Industry: Transport
- Founded: May 30, 1980; March 2, 2002
- Headquarters: Seoul, South Korea
- Key people: Jeong Ki Lee (Executive Vice President, CEO & Acting President)
- Revenue: 580,088 Million Won (2021)
- Number of employees: 2,768
- Parent: Ministry of Land, Infrastructure and Transport
- Website: www.airport.co.kr/

- Korea Airports Corporation
- Hangul: 한국공항공사
- Hanja: 韓國空港公社
- RR: Hanguk gonghang gongsa
- MR: Han'guk konghang kongsa

Korea Airports Corporation (KAC; Korean: 한국공항공사) was established in 1980 in Seoul, South Korea, to carry out construction, checks and balances, management and operation of airports and to manage air transportation efficiently. As an organization specializing in airport management, KAC manages and operates total of 14 airports in Korea including Gimpo, Gimhae, Jeju, Daegu, Muan, Cheongju, and Yangyang international airport. KAC also manages the Area Control Center, 10 VOR/TACs and Korea Civil Aviation Training Center.

Its headquarters are on the property of Gimpo International Airport in Gangseo-gu, Seoul.

== Timeline ==
The Korea Airports Corporation was founded on May 30, 1980, as the International Airport Authority. On July 1, 1980, they acquired the right to operate their first airport – Gimpo International Airport.

Over the next few years he corporation expanded steadily. On May 9, 1983, they acquired the right to operate Gimhae International Airport. They acquired operating rights to Jeju International Airport (Jeju Island) on September 6, 1985. By June 28, 1990 they had the right to operate 9 domestic airports including Daegu Airport.

The organization underwent a series of rebranding efforts. It was renamed the Korea International Airport Authority on April 7, 1990, and later, on December 14, 1991, became known as the Korea Airports Authority.

the company also played a role in aviation training and infrastructure. On June 1, 1984, it opened the Civil Aviation Training Center, and on December 13, 1994, it launched the Air Route Traffic Control Center.

By January 15, 1997, KAC had expanded its operations to include Cheongju and Wonju Airports, and two years later, on January 15, 1999, it acquired eight VOR/TAC navigation facilities, including the one inYangyang (VOR/TAC).

On March 2, 2002, when the organization adopted its current name, Korea Airports Corporation (KAC). The following month, on April 3, it added Yangyang International Airport to its portfolio. KAC soon began to expand its international reach, launching Gimpo-Haneda flight services on November 30, 2003.

In addition to its core operations, the corporation earned the ISO 9001 Service Quality System Certificate on August 30, 2004, and opened its own Service Academy on December 21, 2005.

KAC's operational network continued to grow with the inclusion of Muan International Airport on October 23, 2007, and the start of Gimpo-Hongqiao flight services on October 28 of the same year.

By March 28, 2008, KAC had expanded its business scope to include the manufacturing and sale of R&D equipment as well as participation in overseas airport ventures. This diversification continued with the acquisition of the Uljin Civil Aviation Training Center on July 8, 2010, and further broadened on March 18, 2014, with a focus on training aviation professionals.

On November 22, 2014, the corporation extended its operational domains even further, incorporating aircraft handling and maintenance into its range of services, underscoring its evolution into a comprehensive aviation service provider.

== See also ==
- List of airports in South Korea
- Incheon International Airport Corporation
