= Wonju Airport =

Airport in Wonju, Gangwon, South Korea

Wonju Airport 원주공항
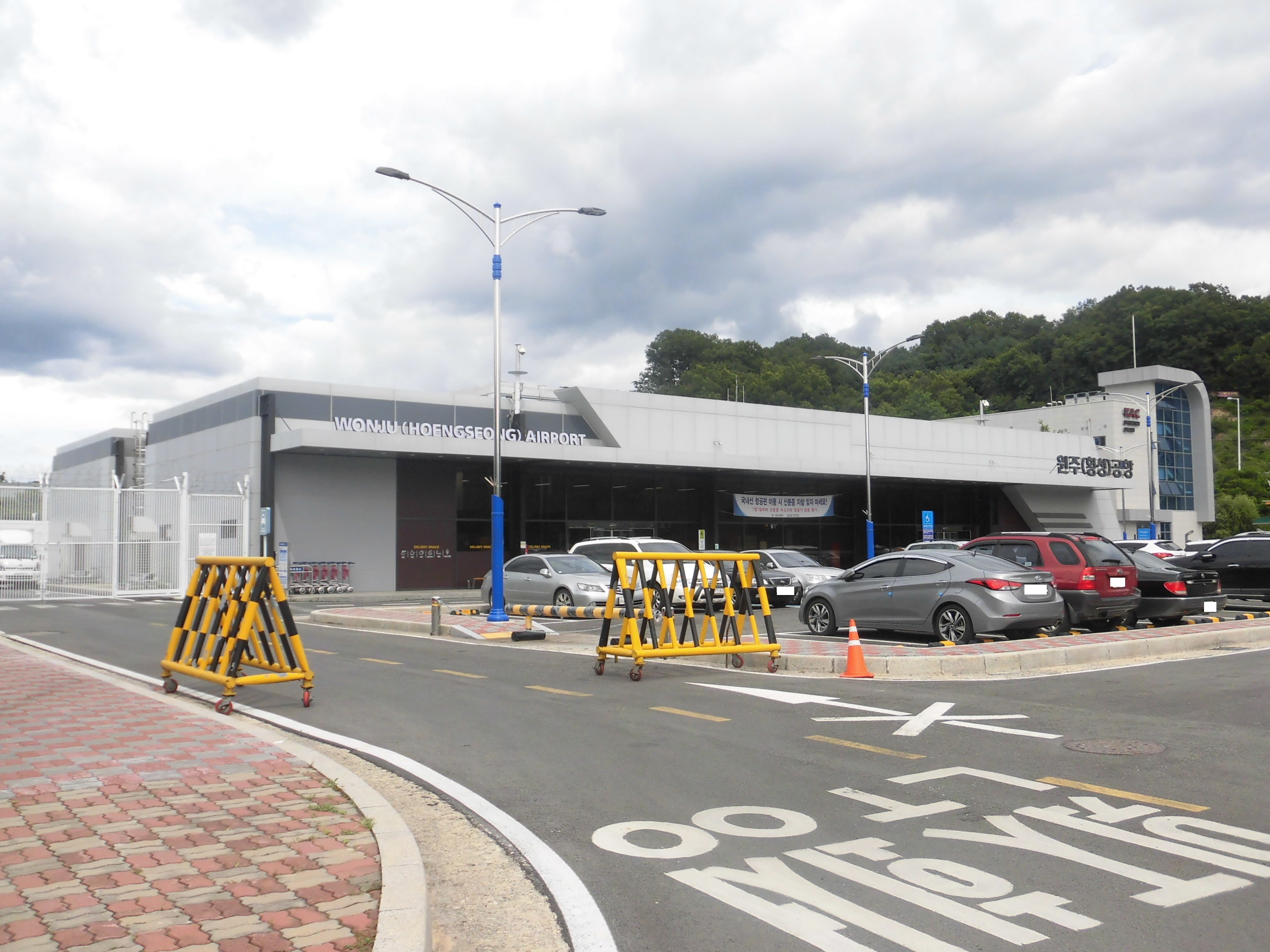
- IATA: WJU; ICAO: RKNW

Summary
- Airport type: Public / Military
- Owner: Ministry of Land, Infrastructure and Transport
- Operator: Korea Airports Corporation; Republic of Korea Air Force
- Serves: Wonju
- Location: Hoengseong County, Gangwon, South Korea
- Opened: 28 February 1997; 29 years ago
- Elevation AMSL: 330 ft (100 m)
- Coordinates: 37.436°N 127.963°E
- Website: www.airport.co.kr/wonjueng

Map
- Location of airport in South Korea

Runways
Direction	Length		Surface
Direction	m	ft	Surface
03/21	2,743	9,000	Concrete

Statistics (2019)
- Passengers: 111,485
- Aircraft Movements: 904
- Cargo Tonnage: 619
- Source:airport.kr

- Wonju Airport
- Hangul: 원주공항
- Hanja: 原州空港
- RR: Wonju gonghang
- MR: Wŏnju konghang

Wonju Airport (IATA: WJU, ICAO: RKNW) is an airport in Hoengseong County, Gangwon, South Korea. During the Korean War it was designated K-46 (Hoengseong Air Base) by the United States Air Force. In 2011, 70,943 passengers used the airport, which is mainly for military use.

== Operations ==
Wonju Airport's passenger terminal is 1.5 km from the airport runway, requiring passengers to take a shuttle bus (about 20 minutes) to their aircraft. There is only one aircraft stand, large enough for a Boeing 737-900. The airport has two daily scheduled flights, currently operated by Jin Air to Jeju. Because Wonju Airport is shared with the military, taking photos or videos of the apron, runway, or any military facility is strictly prohibited.

== Airlines and destinations ==
Airlines	Destinations
Jin Air	Jeju

== Statistics ==
Air traffic statistics
	Aircraft operations	Passenger volume	Cargo tonnage
2001	1,280	73,491	173
2002	615	29,621	108
2003	715	58,355	368
2004	960	95,422	539
2005	694	75,514	476
2006	694	80,361	516
2007	687	79,102	509
2008	706	78,754	534
2009	706	74,201	473
2010	673	70,522	438
2011	696	72,226	430
2012	704	82,759	486
2013	688	79,719	455
2014	689	76,150	447
2015	706	75,146	444
2016	699	78,567	431
2017	705	81,560	459
2018	690	85,725	473
2019	904	111,485	619
2020	404	37,729	213
2021	1,212	132,339	713
2022	1,400	193,239	1,030
2023	1,379	205,279	1,080
Source: Korea Airports Corporation Traffic Statistics

== Ground transportation ==
=== Bus ===
- ● No. 2 : Hoengseong Bus Terminal ↔ Wonju Airport ↔ Wonju station ↔ Wonju City ↔ Gwanseol-dong
- ● No. 2-1 : Hoengseong Bus Terminal ↔ Wonju Airport ↔ Wonju City ↔ Gwanseol-dong
