= Sokcho Airport =

Military airport in Gangwon, South Korea

Sokcho Air Base 속초공항
- IATA: SHO; ICAO: RKND

Summary
- Airport type: Military
- Owner/Operator: Republic of Korea Air Force
- Location: Sokcho, Gangwon, South Korea
- Passenger services ceased: 2 April 2002
- Elevation AMSL: 28 m (92 ft)
- Coordinates: 38°08′33″N 128°35′54″E
- Interactive map of Sokcho Air Base

Runways
Direction	Length		Surface
Direction	m	ft	Surface
05/23	1,560	5,118	Asphalt
- Source: DAFIF

Sokcho Air Base (IATA: SHO, ICAO: RKND) is an air base in Sokcho, Gangwon Province, South Korea. Used by South Korean and United States forces during the Korean War, the base reopened for use as a military airport in 1961 and was used for civilian flights until 2002. The airport has a single 1,560 m (5,120 ft) runway (05/23).

During the Korean War the USAF designated the base as K-50. It was in use as an airhead for United States Marine Corps operations from October 1951, shared with the South Korean I Corps. By March 1952, US cargo and troop flights to K-50 ceased, with the 1st Marine Division moving west toward Seoul.

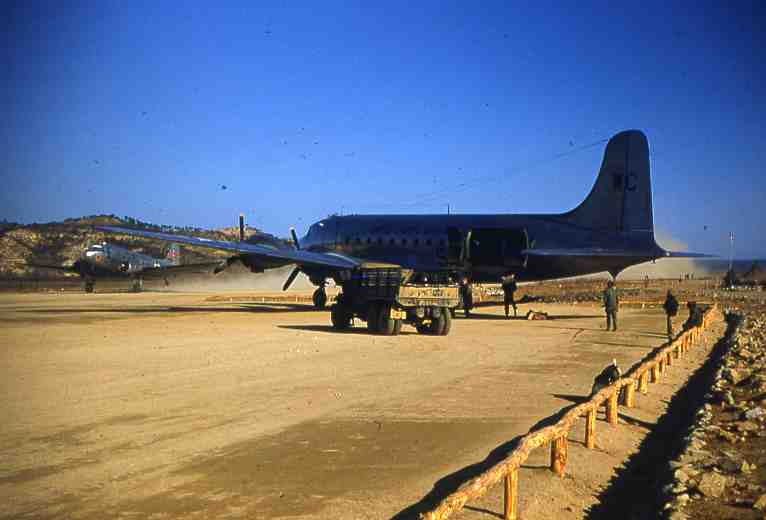
Unloading mail at K-50, Sokcho-Ri, December 1951

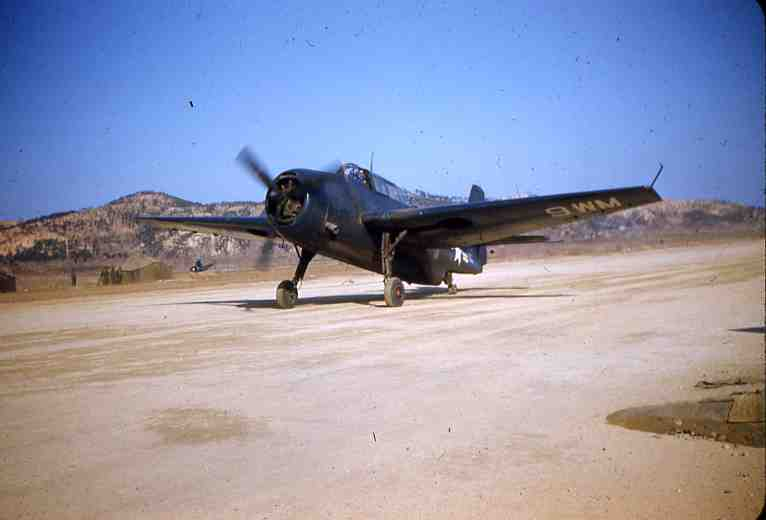
Grumman Avenger converted to repair plane K-50, Sokcho, 24 December 1951

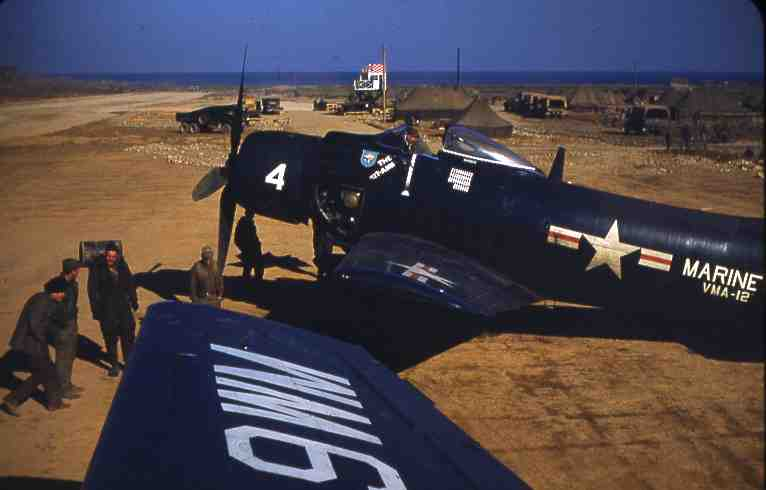
VMA-121 Skyraider, K-50, Sokcho-ri, 24 December 1951

Between 1968 and 2002, it was by Korean Air with commercial flights to Gimpo International Airport in Seoul. These services were withdrawn on 2 April 2002, with flights moving to Yangyang International Airport which opened the next day. In November, the Ministry of Construction and Transportation announced that the airport would close due to the lack of flights. The facility reverted to primarily military operations, but would also be used for civilian fire-fighting helicopter and flight training. The IATA code for Sokcho Air Base has been relegated to King Mswati III International Airport in Eswatini.

In 2009, height restrictions surrounding the air base since 1961 were lifted to permit the development of higher density condominiums and commercial buildings nearby, as well as national projects including the Sokcho-Jumunjin East Sea Expressway. The Anti-Corruption and Civil Rights Commission said it had provided the military an opportunity to modernize the airfield.

== Accidents and incidents ==
- On 23 January 1971, a Korean Airlines Fokker F27 travelling from Sokcho to Seoul-Gimpo airport with 60 people on board was involved in an attempted hijacking. Armed with hand grenades, Kim Sang-tae entered the cockpit shortly after takeoff and demanded the plane fly to North Korea. During a struggle, Sang-tae was shot and killed, but detonated a grenade that severely damaged the aircraft and caused serious injuries to the co-pilot who later died. The aircraft crash-landed on a beach, injuring 12 passengers. Despite injuries to the remaining 4 crew, the hijacker and co-pilot were the only fatalities.
