= Ulsan Airport =

Airport in Ulsan, South Korea

Ulsan Airport 울산공항
- IATA: USN; ICAO: RKPU

Summary
- Airport type: Public
- Owner: Ministry of Land, Infrastructure and Transport
- Operator: Korea Airports Corporation
- Location: Buk District, Ulsan, South Korea
- Opened: 20 November 1970; 55 years ago
- Elevation AMSL: 43 ft / 13 m
- Coordinates: 35°35′36″N 129°21′06″E
- Website: www.airport.co.kr/ulsaneng

Map
- Location of airport in Ulsan Location of airport in South Korea

Runways
Direction	Length		Surface
Direction	m	ft	Surface
18/36	2,000	6,561	Asphalt

Statistics (2019)
- Passengers: 786,739
- Aircraft movements: 6,612
- Cargo tonnage: 3,826
- Source:airport.kr.com; Source: DAFIF

- Ulsan Airport
- Hangul: 울산공항
- Hanja: 蔚山空港
- RR: Ulsan gonghang
- MR: Ulsan konghang

Ulsan Airport (IATA: USN, ICAO: RKPU) is an airport in Ulsan, South Korea. In 2018, 817,341 passengers used the airport.

== Airlines and destinations ==
Airlines	Destinations
Air Busan	Jeju
Jin Air	Jeju, Seoul–Gimpo
Korean Air	Jeju, Seoul–Gimpo

== Statistics ==
Air traffic statistics
	Aircraft operations	Passenger volume	Cargo tonnage
2001	12,629	1,387,574	3,898
2002	12,708	1,383,733	4,688
2003	13,497	1,395,326	4,632
2004	13,444	1,380,788	6,062
2005	11,002	1,222,110	4,311
2006	10,150	1,200,072	4,347
2007	9,353	1,207,740	4,504
2008	9,452	1,130,634	4,208
2009	9,189	1,013,137	3,648
2010	8,632	980,887	3,935
2011	5,803	627,350	2,619
2012	5,471	519,849	2,810
2013	4,977	473,276	2,580
2014	4,864	457,060	2,520
2015	5,019	561,411	2,601
2016	4,891	545,321	2,455
2017	5,337	571,429	2,657
2018	7,189	817,341	3,911
2019	6,612	786,739	3,826
2020	4,930	554,357	2,036
2021	7,441	888,584	2,410
2022	6,235	799,726	2,640
2023	2,982	380,511	1,552
Source: Korea Airports Corporation Traffic Statistics

== Facility ==
- Passenger terminal: 8,651 m^{2}
- Runway: direction= 18/36; length x width = 2000 m x 45 m
- Apron: 3,480 m^{2} (Four B737s can be parked simultaneously.)

At 2,000 meters, the runway of Ulsan Airport is the shortest of any domestic airport in South Korea.

== Ground transportation ==
=== Bus ===
● 102, 111, 122, 203, 205, 216, 225, 235, 236, 256, 266, 402, 412, 422, 432, 442, 453, 702, 714, 732, 1127, 5005 (to KTX Ulsan Station)
