= Yangyang International Airport =

Commercial airport in Gangwon, South Korea

Yangyang International Airport 양양국제공항
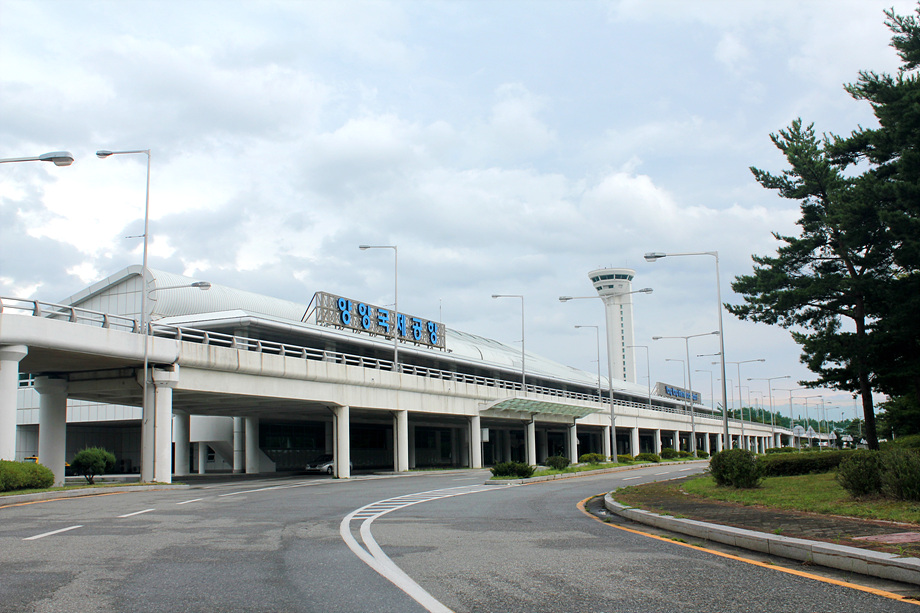
- IATA: YNY; ICAO: RKNY

Summary
- Airport type: Public
- Owner: Ministry of Land, Infrastructure and Transport
- Operator: Korea Airports Corporation
- Serves: Gangneung; Sokcho; Pyeongchang
- Location: Yangyang, Gangwon, South Korea
- Opened: 2 April 2002; 24 years ago
- Elevation AMSL: 73 m (240 ft)
- Coordinates: 38°03′41″N 128°40′09″E
- Website: www.airport.co.kr/yangyangeng

Map
- Location of airport in South Korea

Runways
Direction	Length		Surface
Direction	m	ft	Surface
15/33	2,500	8,202	Asphalt

Statistics (2023)
- Passengers: 158,848
- Aircraft Movements: 1,233
- Cargo (Metri tonnes): 1,417
- Source: Korea Airports Corporation Traffic Statistics

- Yangyang International Airport
- Hangul: 양양국제공항
- Hanja: 襄陽國際空港
- RR: Yangyang gukjegonghang
- MR: Yangyang kukchegonghang

Yangyang International Airport (IATA: YNY, ICAO: RKNY) is a minor international airport in northeastern South Korea. It is located in Yangyang County, Gangwon Province and was built to serve the nearby areas of Gangneung, Sokcho, and Pyeongchang. The airport replaced Gangneung and Sokcho airports.

== History ==
Air Koryo operated charters from Sondok Airport in North Korea to Yangyang Airport during 2002–2006 for a few months every year. Flights were halted indefinitely after relations soured between the two Koreas. Yangyang International Airport handled its last flight on 1 November 2008, according to the Korea Airport Corporation, and there were calls for it to be sold off or closed. It reopened on 16 July 2010 when East Asia Airline started flying to Busan.

On 4 August 2011, Taiwan's TransAsia Airways began five flights a week to Yangyang International Airport. TransAsia Airways stated that it will be a regular chartered service. However, on 18 February 2017, TransAsia Airways went into liquidation. In 2011, 5,748 passengers used the airport.

When Pyeongchang won the rights to host the 2018 Winter Olympics, an increase in passengers was expected at Yangyang International Airport. Korean Air scheduled additional charter flights from Yangyang to Europe and North America, including New York–JFK, Minneapolis–St. Paul, London–Gatwick, and Munich. This included a visa-free grace for the Philippines, Indonesia, and Vietnam so long as citizens land in Yangyang. VietJet Air is the only airline carrier that operates flights from South East Asia to Yangyang (charter flights from Hanoi to Yangyang).

As of 2025, the airport does not have a control radar.

== Airlines and destinations ==
Airlines	Destinations
Parata Air	Jeju

== Statistics ==
Air traffic statistics
	Aircraft operations	Passenger volume	Cargo tonnage
2002	3,128	217,115	926
2003	2,629	194,539	870
2004	1,523	114,342	447
2005	737	60,690	223
2006	1,059	51,547	197
2007	932	35,300	150
2008	155	9,312	64
2009	0	0	0
2010	134	8,930	90
2011	72	5,749	71
2012	198	23,354	212
2013	304	38,748	411
2014	1,454	237,538	2,385
2015	889	126,325	1,352
2016	621	88,704	892
2017	179	15,780	169
2018	342	37,671	471
2019	435	54,283	466
2020	2,542	238,748	1,177
2021	2,377	204,052	1,004
2022	2,981	384,642	2,210
2023	1,233	158,848	1,417
Source: Korea Airports Corporation Traffic Statistics

== Ground transportation ==
=== Bus ===
- Shuttle Bus: Yangyang Bus Terminal ↔ Yangyang International Airport

== See also ==
- Transport in South Korea
