= Yangyang County =

Coordinates: 38°04′N 128°37′E

Yangyang
- County
- Panoramic view of Yangyang-eup

- Flag Emblem of Yangyang

- Location in South Korea
- State: Gangwon
- Administrative divisions: 1 eup, 5 myeon

Area
  - Total: 629.77 km^{2} (243.16 sq mi)

Population (February 2026)
  - Total: 27,390
  - Density: 43.5/km^{2} (113/sq mi)

Korean name
- Hangul: 양양군
- Hanja: 襄陽郡
- RR: Yangyang-gun
- MR: Yangyang-gun

Yangyang County (Korean: 양양군) is a county in Gangwon Province, South Korea. Its population is about 27,000 as of 2026. Its economy is centered on forestry and fishing. It is also known for its cultural heritage and natural attractions such as Naksansa and beaches.

== History ==
Prior to the Three Kingdoms period, Yangyang belonged to Eastern Ye. When Goguryeo occupied the region, it was called Ikyeon-hyeon (익현현; 翼峴縣) or Imun-hyeon (이문현; 伊文縣). After Silla conquered Goguryeo, it was renamed to Ingnyeong-hyeon (익령현; 翼嶺縣).

In 1221, it was promoted to Yangju (양주; 襄州) for fighting off Mongolian soldiers. However, it was demoted to Deongnyeong-hyeon (덕녕현; 德寧縣) for surrendering to the enemy. In 1260, it was restored to Yangju. As it was the hometown of Taejo of Joseon's mother, it was promoted to bu (부; 府) in 1397. In 1416, its name was changed to Yangyang.

== Administrative divisions ==
Name	Korean text	Area (km^{2})	Population (2026)	Map
Yangyang-eup	양양읍	32.4	12,615	
Seo-myeon	서면	267.8	2,600	
Sonyang-myeon	손양면	47.4	2,153	
Hyeonbuk-myeon	현북면	164.85	2,597	
Hyeonnam-myeon	현남면	64.56	2,911	
Ganghyeon-myeon	강현면	52.76	4,514	
Total		629.77	27,390	

== Industry ==
The cultivation acreage is 3,724ha. Major crops are rice, corn, potato and beans. The forest area is 52,480ha. Major forest products are chestnut and songi.

There are 968 fishers as of 2008. Major catches are myeongtae, squid, anchovy and mackerel. Yangyang Inland Fisheries Research Institute releases salmon from hatcheries into Namdae Stream.

Yangyang Iron Mine used to be South Korea's biggest iron mine but closed in 1994 due to the depletion of iron ore and high production costs. The manufacturing industry is weak with only refrigeration facilities in Yangyang-eup.

== Education ==
Yangyang Hyanggyo was established in 1329.

As of 2015, there are 14 elementary schools, 5 middle schools and 2 high schools. Yangyang Campus of Kwandong University opened in 1995 but closed in 2008.

== Transport ==
=== Airport ===
Yangyang International Airport began operation in 2002 but became a "ghost airport", probably because of the construction of new motorways. All flights were suspended in 2023 when Fly Gangwon which used the airport as its base went bankrupt.

=== Roads ===
Donghae Expressway and Seoul–Yangyang Expressway pass through the region.

== Culture and tourism ==
=== Heritage ===
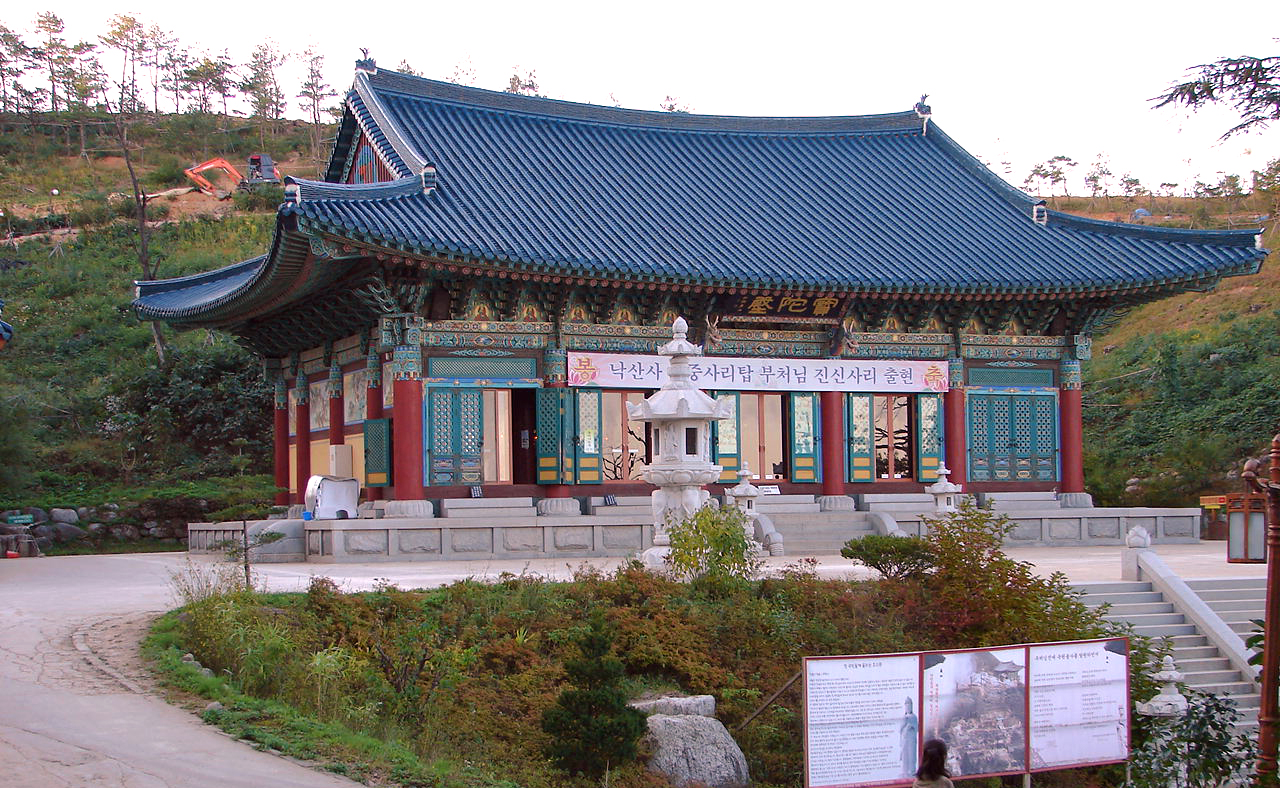
Naksansa

Naksansa is a Buddhist temple founded in 671. It is designated as a Historic Site. Uisangdae pavilion and Hongnyeonam hermitage in the temple are designated as Scenic Sites.

Three-story Stone Pagoda at Jinjeonsa Temple Site is representative of stone pagodas made in Unified Silla. It is the only National Treasure in Yangyang.

=== Nature ===
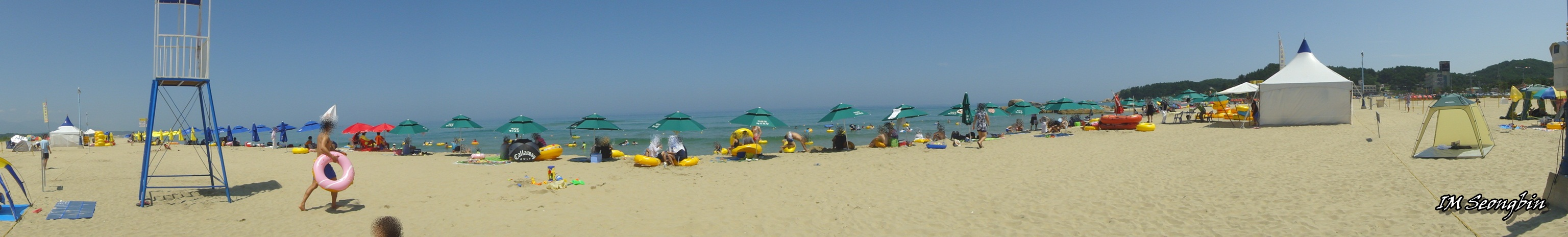
Panorama of Hajodae Beach

Hajodae is a cliffed coast surrounded by a pine tree forest. It is designated as a Scenic Site. Ha Ryun and Jo Jun, founding contributors of Joseon, are said to have planned the revolution here. Hajodae Beach is popular among family vacationers. Naksan Beach is also popular. The nearby Surfyy Beach is a popular place to surf.

Seoraksan spans over Yangyang, Sokcho, Goseong, and Inje.

=== Festivals ===
Hyeonsan Culture Festival is held around Dano for the harmony and prosperity of residents. Started in 1007 (10th year of the reign of King Mokjong), its modern form was established in 1979.

Yangyang Songi Festival, which began in 1997, is held every October. Visitors can pick mushrooms, try songi dishes and enjoy takjangsanori (탁장사놀이; traditional game based on the story of Tak Jangsa who carried geumgangsong during the construction of Gyeongbokgung).

During the Yangyang Salmon Festival which began in 1997, visitors can catch and eat salmon.

== Climate ==
As Yangyang is located between the steep slope of the Taebaek Mountains and East Sea, its climate is close to oceanic climate.

== Notable people ==
- Kim Yoo-mi, actress

== Sister cities ==
- China: Xiangzhou
- Japan: Rokkasho, Daisen

== Gallery ==
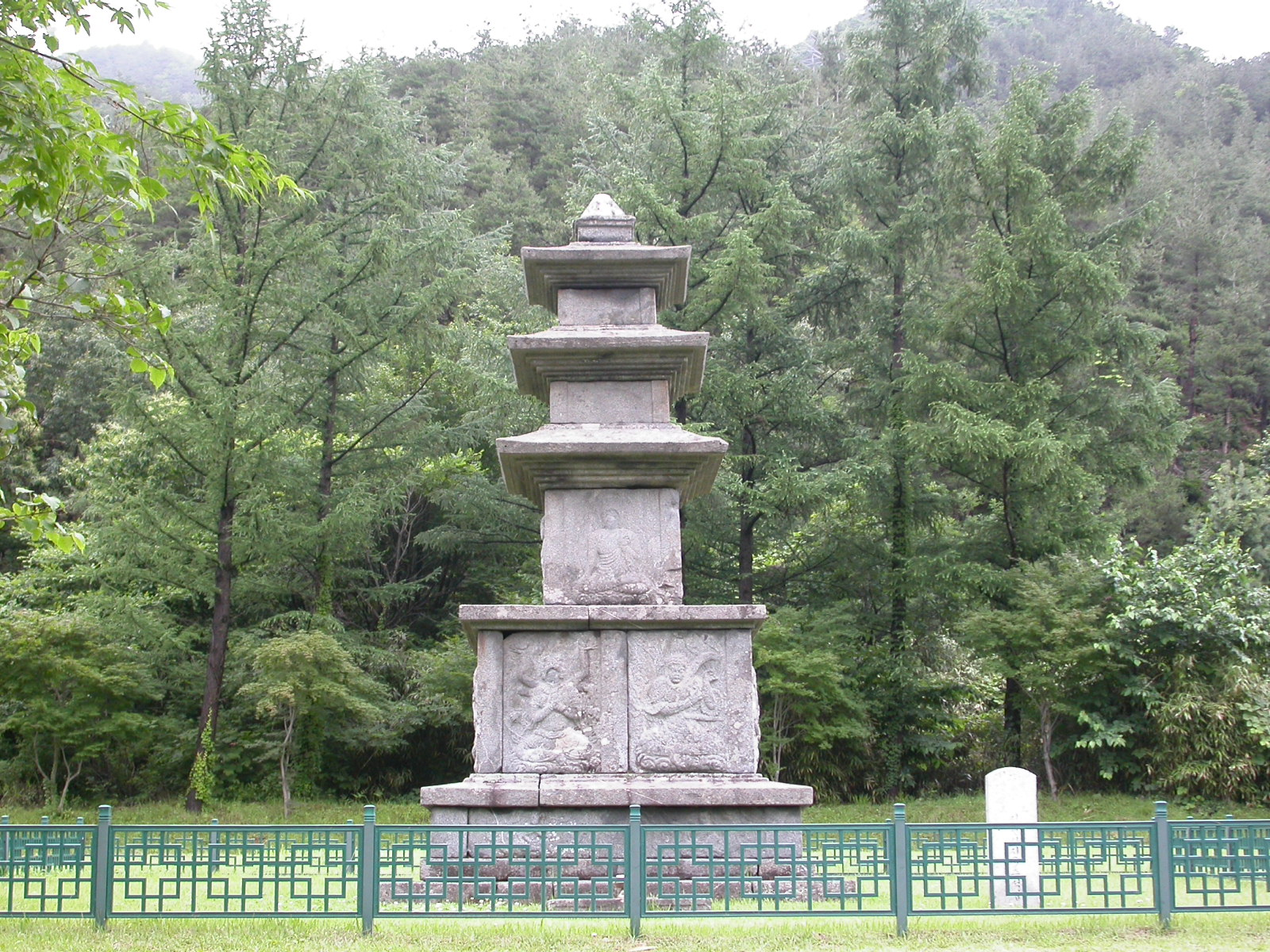
Three-story Stone Pagoda at Jinjeonsa Temple Site

Naksansa
