= List of Asiana Airlines destinations =

As of December 2024, Asiana Airlines offers regular passenger service to over 80 destinations (except seasonal charter destinations) in 26 countries from its two hub airports, Incheon International Airport and Gimpo International Airport in South Korea. Outside South Korea, the countries with the largest airports served by Asiana Airlines are China with 24, Japan with nine and the United States with 10.

As of July 2020, Asiana Airlines operates between Incheon and 22 cities in China, and along with Korean Air is one of the two largest foreign airlines to operate in China.

Since the COVID-19 pandemic was declared in January 2020, Asiana Airlines has suspended most domestic and international routes, and following the merger with Korean Air, Asiana Airlines ends cargo operation on July 31, 2025.

As of October 2023, Asiana Airlines operates limited domestic and international routes.

== List ==
Country	City	Airport	Notes	Refs
Australia	Cairns	Cairns Airport	Terminated	
Australia	Melbourne	Melbourne Airport	Seasonal	
Australia	Sydney	Sydney Airport	Passenger	
Austria	Vienna	Vienna International Airport ^{Cargo}	Terminated	
Bangladesh	Dhaka	Hazrat Shahjalal International Airport ^{Charter}	Terminated	
Belgium	Brussels	Brussels Airport ^{Cargo}	Terminated	
Brunei	Bandar Seri Begawan	Brunei International Airport ^{Charter}	Terminated	
Cambodia	Phnom Penh	Phnom Penh International Airport	Airport closed	
Cambodia	Phnom Penh	Techo International Airport	Passenger	
Cambodia	Siem Reap	Siem Reap–Angkor International Airport	Seasonal charter	
Cambodia	Siem Reap	Siem Reap International Airport	Airport closed	
Canada	Calgary	Calgary International Airport ^{Cargo}	Terminated	
Canada	Halifax	Halifax Stanfield International Airport ^{Cargo}	Terminated	
China	Beijing	Beijing Capital International Airport	Passenger	
China	Changchun	Changchun Longjia International Airport	Passenger	
China	Changsha	Changsha Huanghua International Airport	Passenger	
China	Chengdu	Chengdu Shuangliu International Airport	Terminated	
China	Chengdu	Chengdu Tianfu International Airport	Passenger	
China	Chongqing	Chongqing Jiangbei International Airport	Passenger	
China	Dalian	Dalian Zhoushuizi International Airport	Passenger	
China	Guangzhou	Guangzhou Baiyun International Airport	Passenger	
China	Guilin	Guilin Liangjiang International Airport	Passenger	
China	Guiyang	Guiyang Longdongbao International Airport ^{Charter}	Terminated	
China	Haikou	Haikou Meilan International Airport ^{Passenger}	Suspended	
China	Hailar	Hulunbuir Hailar Airport ^{Charter}	Terminated	
China	Hangzhou	Hangzhou Xiaoshan International Airport	Passenger	
China	Harbin	Harbin Taiping International Airport	Passenger	
China	Huangshan	Huangshan Tunxi International Airport	Terminated	
China	Jinan	Jinan Yaoqiang International Airport	Terminated	
China	Lanzhou	Lanzhou Zhongchuan International Airport	Terminated	
China	Lijiang	Lijiang Sanyi International Airport ^{Charter}	Terminated	
China	Nanchang	Nanchang Changbei International Airport ^{Charter}	Terminated	
China	Nanjing	Nanjing Lukou International Airport	Passenger	
China	Ningbo	Ningbo Lishe International Airport ^{Charter}	Terminated	
China	Qingdao	Qingdao Jiaodong International Airport	Passenger	
China	Qingdao	Qingdao Liuting International Airport	Airport closed	
China	Qiqihar	Qiqihar Sanjiazi Airport ^{Charter}	Terminated	
China	Shanghai	Shanghai Hongqiao International Airport	Passenger	
China	Shanghai	Shanghai Pudong International Airport	Passenger	
China	Shenyang	Shenyang Taoxian International Airport ^{Passenger}	Suspended	
China	Shenzhen	Shenzhen Bao'an International Airport	Passenger	
China	Taiyuan	Taiyuan Wusu International Airport ^{Charter}	Terminated	
China	Tianjin	Tianjin Binhai International Airport	Passenger	
China	Weihai	Weihai Dashuipo Airport ^{Passenger}	Suspended	
China	Wenzhou	Wenzhou Longwan International Airport ^{Charter}	Terminated	
China	Xi'an	Xi'an Xianyang International Airport	Passenger	
China	Xuzhou	Xuzhou Guanyin International Airport ^{Charter}	Terminated	
China	Yancheng	Yancheng Nanyang International Airport	Passenger	
China	Yanji	Yanji Chaoyangchuan International Airport	Passenger	
China	Yantai	Yantai Penglai International Airport	Suspended	
China	Zhangjiajie	Zhangjiajie Hehua International Airport ^{Charter}	Terminated	
Czech Republic	Prague	Václav Havel Airport Prague	Passenger	
Egypt	Cairo	Cairo International Airport	Passenger	
France	Paris	Charles de Gaulle Airport	Passenger	
Germany	Frankfurt	Frankfurt Airport	Passenger	
Greece	Athens	Athens International Airport	Seasonal charter	
Guam	Hagåtña	Antonio B. Won Pat International Airport ^{Passenger}	Suspended	
Hong Kong	Hong Kong	Hong Kong International Airport	Passenger	
Hong Kong	Hong Kong	Kai Tak International Airport	Airport closed	
Hungary	Budapest	Budapest Ferenc Liszt International Airport	Passenger	
India	Delhi	Indira Gandhi International Airport	Terminated	
Indonesia	Denpasar	Ngurah Rai International Airport	Terminated	
Indonesia	Jakarta	Soekarno–Hatta International Airport	Passenger	
Italy	Milan	Milan Malpensa Airport	Passenger	
Italy	Palermo	Falcone Borsellino Airport ^{Seasonal charter}	Terminated	
Italy	Rome	Rome Fiumicino Airport	Passenger	
Italy	Venice	Venice Marco Polo Airport ^{Passenger}	Suspended	
Japan	Asahikawa	Asahikawa Airport	Passenger	
Japan	Fukuoka	Fukuoka Airport	Passenger	
Japan	Fukushima	Fukushima Airport	Terminated	
Japan	Hiroshima	Hiroshima Airport	Terminated	
Japan	Kobe	Kobe Airport	Passenger	
Japan	Kumamoto	Kumamoto Airport	Passenger	
Japan	Omitama	Ibaraki Airport	Terminated	
Japan	Matsuyama	Matsuyama Airport	Terminated	
Japan	Memanbetsu	Memanbetsu Airport ^{Charter}	Terminated	
Japan	Miyazaki	Miyazaki Airport	Passenger	
Japan	Nagoya	Chubu Centrair International Airport	Passenger	
Japan	Naha	Naha Airport	Passenger	
Japan	Osaka	Kansai International Airport	Passenger	
Japan	Osaka	Osaka International Airport ^{Charter}	Terminated	
Japan	Sapporo	New Chitose Airport	Passenger	
Japan	Sendai	Sendai Airport	Passenger	
Japan	Shizuoka	Shizuoka Airport	Terminated	
Japan	Takamatsu	Takamatsu Airport	Terminated	
Japan	Tokyo	Haneda International Airport	Passenger	
Japan	Tokyo	Narita International Airport	Passenger	
Japan	Toyama	Toyama Airport	Terminated	
Japan	Yonago	Miho-Yonago Airport	Terminated	
Kazakhstan	Almaty	Almaty International Airport	Passenger	
Kazakhstan	Astana	Nursultan Nazarbayev International Airport	Terminated	
Macau	Macau	Macau International Airport	Terminated	
Malaysia	Johor Bahru	Senai International Airport ^{Charter}	Terminated	
Malaysia	Kota Kinabalu	Kota Kinabalu International Airport	Seasonal	
Malaysia	Kuala Lumpur	Kuala Lumpur International Airport ^{Cargo}	Terminated	
Malaysia	Penang	Penang International Airport ^{Cargo}	Terminated	
Mongolia	Ulaanbaatar	Buyant-Ukhaa International Airport	Airport closed	
Mongolia	Ulaanbaatar	Chinggis Khaan International Airport	Passenger	
Myanmar	Yangon	Yangon International Airport	Terminated	
Netherlands	Amsterdam	Amsterdam Airport Schiphol ^{Cargo}	Terminated	
New Zealand	Auckland	Auckland Airport	Terminated	
New Zealand	Christchurch	Christchurch Airport ^{Seasonal charter}	Terminated	
Northern Mariana Islands	Saipan	Saipan International Airport	Passenger	
Norway	Oslo	Oslo Gardermoen Airport ^{Seasonal charter}	Terminated	
Palau	Koror	Roman Tmetuchl International Airport ^{Passenger}	Suspended	
Philippines	Cebu	Mactan–Cebu International Airport	Terminated	
Philippines	Clark	Clark International Airport	Passenger	
Philippines	Kalibo	Kalibo International Airport	Terminated	
Philippines	Manila	Ninoy Aquino International Airport	Passenger	
Philippines	Tagbilaran	Bohol–Panglao International Airport	Seasonal charter	
Portugal	Lisbon	Lisbon Airport ^{Charter}	Terminated	
Russia	Khabarovsk	Khabarovsk Novy Airport	Terminated	
Russia	Moscow	Domodedovo International Airport ^{Cargo}	Terminated	
Russia	Saint Petersburg	Pulkovo Airport ^{Cargo}	Terminated	
Russia	Vladivostok	Vladivostok International Airport	Terminated	
Russia	Yuzhno-Sakhalinsk	Yuzhno-Sakhalinsk Airport	Terminated	
Singapore	Singapore	Changi Airport	Passenger	
Spain	Barcelona	Josep Tarradellas Barcelona–El Prat Airport	Passenger	
South Korea	Busan	Gimhae International Airport	Passenger	
South Korea	Cheongju	Cheongju International Airport	Passenger	
South Korea	Daegu	Daegu International Airport	Passenger	
South Korea	Gwangju	Gwangju Airport	Passenger	
South Korea	Jeju	Jeju International Airport	Focus city	
South Korea	Mokpo	Mokpo Airport	Airport closed	
South Korea	Muan	Muan International Airport	Terminated	
South Korea	Pohang	Pohang Gyeongju Airport	Terminated	
South Korea	Sacheon	Sacheon Airport	Terminated	
South Korea	Seoul	Gimpo International Airport	Domestic hub	
South Korea	Seoul	Incheon International Airport	International hub	
South Korea	Ulsan	Ulsan Airport	Terminated	
South Korea	Yecheon	Yecheon Airport	Airport closed	
South Korea	Yeosu	Yeosu Airport	Passenger	
Sweden	Gothenburg	Göteborg Landvetter Airport ^{Cargo}	Terminated	
Taiwan	Kaohsiung	Kaohsiung International Airport	Passenger	
Taiwan	Taichung	Taichung International Airport	Passenger	
Taiwan	Taipei	Taoyuan International Airport	Passenger	
Thailand	Bangkok	Don Mueang International Airport	Terminated	
Thailand	Bangkok	Suvarnabhumi International Airport	Passenger	
Thailand	Chiang Mai	Chiang Mai International Airport	Terminated	
Thailand	Krabi	Krabi International Airport ^{Charter}	Terminated	
Thailand	Phuket	Phuket International Airport	Passenger	
Turkey	Istanbul	Istanbul Arnavutköy International Airport	Passenger	
Turkey	Istanbul	Istanbul Atatürk International Airport	Airport closed	
United Kingdom	London	London Heathrow International Airport	Passenger	
United Kingdom	London	London Stansted Airport ^{Cargo}	Terminated	
United States	Anchorage	Ted Stevens Anchorage International Airport ^{Cargo}	Terminated	
United States	Atlanta	Hartsfield–Jackson Atlanta International Airport ^{Cargo}	Terminated	
United States	Chicago	O'Hare International Airport ^{Cargo}	Terminated	
United States	Dallas	Dallas Fort Worth International Airport ^{Cargo}	Terminated	
United States	Honolulu	Daniel K. Inouye International Airport	Passenger	
United States	Los Angeles	Los Angeles International Airport	Passenger	
United States	Miami	Miami International Airport ^{Cargo}	Terminated	
United States	New York City	John F. Kennedy International Airport	Passenger	
United States	Portland, OR	Portland International Airport ^{Cargo}	Terminated	
United States	San Francisco	San Francisco International Airport	Passenger	
United States	Seattle	Seattle–Tacoma International Airport	Terminated	
Uzbekistan	Tashkent	Tashkent International Airport	Passenger	
Vietnam	Da Nang	Da Nang International Airport	Passenger	
Vietnam	Ha Long	Van Don International Airport ^{Charter}	Terminated	
Vietnam	Hanoi	Noi Bai International Airport	Passenger	
Vietnam	Ho Chi Minh City	Tan Son Nhat International Airport	Passenger	
Vietnam	Nha Trang	Cam Ranh International Airport	Passenger	
Vietnam	Phu Quoc	Phu Quoc International Airport ^{Passenger}	Suspended	
