= Asiana Airlines =

Airline of South Korea

- Asiana Airlines Airbus A350
IATA	ICAO	Call sign
OZ	AAR	ASIANA
- Founded: 17 February 1988; 38 years ago (as Seoul Airlines)
- Commenced operations: 23 December 1988; 37 years ago
- Hubs: Seoul–Gimpo; Seoul–Incheon
- Focus cities: Jeju
- Frequent-flyer program: Asiana Club
- Alliance: Star Alliance
- Subsidiaries: Air Busan; Air Seoul; Asiana Airport; Asiana IDT; Asiana Sabre; Kumho Resort
- Fleet size: 67
- Destinations: 78
- Parent company: Korean Air (63.9%) (2024–present); Korea Development Bank (2020–2024); Kumho Asiana Group (1988–2020)
- Traded as: KRX: 020560
- Headquarters: Osoe-dong, Gangseo District, Seoul, South Korea
- Key people: Won Yoo-seok (president & CEO)
- Revenue: ▲ ₩5,552 billion (2015)
- Employees: 10,380 (2015)
- Website: flyasiana.com

Korean name
- Hangul: 아시아나항공
- Hanja: 아시아나航空
- RR: Asiana hanggong
- MR: Asiana hanggong

Asiana Airlines Inc. (Korean: 아시아나항공; Hanja: 아시아나航空; RR: Asiana Hanggong KRX: 020560) is a South Korean airline headquartered in Seoul. The airline operates 90 international passenger routes, 14 domestic passenger routes and 27 cargo routes throughout Asia, Europe, and North America. In 2019, it accounted for 25% of South Korea's international aviation market and 20% of its domestic market. It maintains its international hub at Incheon International Airport and its domestic hub at Gimpo International Airport, both in Seoul. The airline will merge with Korean Air on 17 December 2026.

Asiana Airlines started merging with Korean Air in 2024, creating a dominant carrier in South Korea and completing a process that was initiated in 2020. It is a full-service airline member of Star Alliance. Asiana Airlines has two subsidiary low-cost carriers, Air Busan and Air Seoul: It is the largest shareholder of Air Busan, a regional carrier that the airline established as joint venture with Busan; it also operates Air Seoul, a wholly owned subsidiary.

== History ==
=== Founding ===
Korean Air, which was acquired by Hanjin Transportation in 1969, had a monopoly on the South Korean airline industry until the establishment of Asiana in 1988. Asiana's formation did not come about as a policy initiative favoring liberalized market conditions, but rather because of pressure from other chaebols and interests that wanted to compete. It was formed by the Kumho Asiana Group (formerly Kumho Group) as Seoul Air International. Asiana was established on 17 February 1988 and started operations in December 1988 with flights to Busan. As of 2007, the airline was owned by domestic private investors (30.53%), Kumho Industrial (29.51%), Kumho Petrochemical (15.05%), foreign investors (11.9%), Korea Development Bank (7.18%), and others (5.83%).

=== Beginning regular service ===
Asiana began operations in December 1988, using Boeing 737 Classic aircraft, with flights to Busan and Gwangju. In 1989, Asiana began regular services to Jeju City, Gwangju, and Daegu, and later that same year, began international chartered flights to Sendai in Japan. In 1990, Asiana began its first scheduled international services to the Japanese cities of Tokyo, Nagoya, Sendai, and Fukuoka. In the same year, Asiana had nine Boeing 747-400s, 20 Boeing 767-300s, and eight Boeing 737-400s. In early 1991, Asiana began services to Bangkok, Singapore, Hong Kong, and Taipei. Transpacific flights to Los Angeles began in December 1991 with a Boeing 747-400 Combi. Services to Vienna, Brussels, and Honolulu began in the mid-1990s. In 1993, Asiana began services in Ho Chi Minh City in Vietnam.

=== Expansion as a global carrier and joining Star Alliance ===
Asiana Airlines has rapidly expanded since its establishment in 1988 to become a mid-sized global carrier with a fleet of 85 aircraft. In December 1998, the airline operated an aircraft on behalf of the president of South Korea for the first time. The airline was listed in KOSDAQ In December 1999. On 28 January 2003, the airline became a full Star Alliance member, expanding its worldwide network and global brand. In 2004, the airline added Airbus A330s and the Boeing 777-200ERs to its fleet and expanded its routes into mainland China. Currently, it provides international services to 71 cities in 23 countries on 91 routes and domestic services to 12 cities on 14 routes. It also provides international cargo services to 29 cities in 14 countries on 28 routes by Asiana Cargo, the airline's freight division. In 2012, the airline had net sales of US$5.3 billion.

=== New corporate identity ===
In February 2006, Asiana Airlines modernized its corporate identity for unification with those of other divisions of its parent company, the Kumho Asiana Group. The names of the travel classes have changed from first, business, and economy classes to first, business, and travel classes, respectively, and the colors of the travel classes have changed to yellow, blue, and red for first, business, and travel, respectively. New uniforms were also created for the crew.

=== Financial crisis ===
In April 2019, Asiana Airlines' parent company, Kumho Asiana Group, announced its plan to sell Asiana Airlines as a solution to its financial crisis. Asiana Airlines discontinued several unprofitable routes in the summer and fall of 2019 and, that September, the Aekyung Group, Mirae Asset Daewoo, and Korea Corporate Governance Improvement applied a letter of intent to acquire Asiana Airlines. On 12 November, a consortium of HDC Hyundai Development Company and Mirae Asset Daewoo was selected as the preferred bidder. The proposed purchase was approved in South Korea, China, Kazakhstan, Turkey, the United States, and Uzbekistan, but the merger was canceled by Korea Development Bank, the primary creditor for Asiana Airlines, and Kumho Asiana Group. Asiana Airlines would be run by creditors until a new owner was approved by the South Korean government.

Asiana Airlines has chosen to retire older aircraft, including Boeing 747-400s and Boeing 767-300s, allowing the airline to reduce debt and weakness.

=== Merger with Korean Air ===
On 16 November 2020, the Government of the Republic of Korea announced a policy of merging Asiana Airlines with Korean Air, which would acquire a 30.77% stake in Asiana from Korea Development Bank. The Korean state-run bank would invest 800 billion won (US$600 million) to Hanjin KAL, the holding company of Korean Air, to fund the merger. The two airlines would operate as separate brands until integration is complete. The Ministry of Land, Infrastructure, and Transport planned to integrate subsidiaries Air Busan, Air Seoul, and Jin Air into a new low-cost airline. The combined low-cost carrier will focus on regional airports within South Korea and flying regional Asia-Pacific routes.

==== 2021 ====
In March 2021, Korean Air announced it would delay the merger with Asiana Airlines due to a delay in antitrust approval from the government and six foreign authorities (China, Japan, Taiwan, Thailand, the United States, and Vietnam). Korean Air will operate Asiana Airlines as a subsidiary for the next two years, after which it will combine its operations, IT, and other systems into a single system until 2024. Once the merger is complete, Asiana Airlines could become a member of SkyTeam. According to The Korea Times, only Turkey has approved the antitrust deal so far.

On 30 June 2021, the post-merger plans between the two airlines were reported to have been finalized and approved by Korea Development Bank.

In August 2021, the Malaysian Aviation Commission approved the merger between Korean Air and Asiana Airlines, citing economic efficiencies and social benefits.

On 16 November 2021, it was announced that Ministry of Industry and Trade of Vietnam had approved Korean Air's acquisition of smaller local rival Asiana Airlines Inc.

==== 2022 ====
On 26 December 2022, the Ministry of Commerce of the People's Republic of China announced its approval of Korean Air's business combination with Asiana Airlines.

==== 2023 ====
The U.S. Department of Justice blocked the deal in May 2023, citing monopoly concerns. In November 2023, Asiana agreed to divest its cargo business in an attempt to appease regulatory concerns.

==== 2024 ====
On 28 November 2024, the European Commission approved the merger, followed by the approval from the United States on 2 December 2024. Following approval from all 14 countries, Korean Air officially completed the acquisition of Asiana Airlines on 12 December 2024.

Korean Air Co. said on 7 August 2024 that it signed a tentative agreement valued at 470 billion won (US$341.7 million) to sell the cargo business division of Asiana Airlines Inc. to Air Incheon.

On 12 December 2024, Korean Air completed the purchase of the debt-laden Asiana Airlines in a deal worth 1.5 trillion won (US$1.6 billion). The deal enables Korean Air to acquire 63.88% in the second-largest airline in the country, becoming the 12th-largest airline in the world by international capacity.

=== Towards integration with Korean Air in 2026 ===
In December 2024, Asiana Airlines quietly launched its new brand identity after the merger, which includes the removal of the "red arrow" elements (also branded as the Asiana Wings) of the previous owner Kumho Asiana Group and using the aircraft tail as a replacement. The Kumho Asiana Group logo on the fuselage has been removed, and the red arrows on all the passenger aircraft in the fleet have also been either removed or covered.

The brand identity of the two airlines will remain unchanged until the integration is fully completed and in the meantime, several integration process will be conducted, including appointing a new CEO and key executives, as well as the integration of the low-cost subsidiaries of both Korean Air and Asiana Airlines, including Jin Air, Air Busan and Air Seoul.

Asiana will end its 38 years of operation and will be integrated to Korean Air by the end of 2026.

== Corporate affairs ==
The airline has its global headquarters in Seoul at the Asiana Town (아시아나타운) in Osoe-dong, Gangseo District, Seoul. The airline's head office moved from Hoehyeon-dong, Jung District to Asiana Town in Osoe-dong on 1 April 1998.

== Destinations ==
Asiana Airlines serves destinations on five continents, with an Asian network that includes important cities in the China, Japan, Southeast Asia, and Central Asia. The airline serves several gateway cities in North America and Europe while retaining limited coverage of Oceania. Asiana Cargo, the airline's former cargo subsidiary, also had a wide network, especially in Europe, Asia, and the United States.

Asiana decided to launch Air Seoul, the airline's second subsidiary and its low-cost carrier, based in Incheon International Airport, and transfer some of its unprofitable routes to the subsidiary in November 2016.

=== Codeshare agreements ===
Asiana Airlines codeshares with these airlines:

- Air Astana
- Air Busan (Subsidiary)
- Air Canada
- Air China
- Air India
- Air Macau
- Air New Zealand
- Air Seoul (Subsidiary)
- All Nippon Airways
- Austrian Airlines
- China Southern Airlines
- Copa Airlines
- Croatia Airlines
- EgyptAir
- Ethiopian Airlines
- Etihad Airways
- EVA Air
- Hong Kong Airlines
- Juneyao Air
- Korean Air
- LOT Polish Airlines
- Myanmar Airways International
- Qatar Airways
- Shandong Airlines
- Shenzhen Airlines
- Singapore Airlines
- South African Airways
- Thai Airways International
- Turkish Airlines
- United Airlines
- Uzbekistan Airways

=== Interline agreements ===
Asiana Airlines has interline agreements with the following airlines:

- Deutsche Bahn (railway)
- Lao Airlines

== Fleet ==
=== Current fleet ===
As of July 2026, Asiana Airlines operates the following aircraft: These aircraft will be part of the Korean Air fleet after the merger between the two airlines is completed.

Asiana Airlines fleet
Aircraft	In service	Orders	Passengers					Notes
Aircraft	In service	Orders	C+	C	W	Y	Total	Notes
Airbus A321-200	11	—	—	12	—	162	174	
Airbus A321neo	13	12	—	12	—	168	180	
Airbus A321neo	13	12	—	8	—	180	188	
Airbus A330-300	14	—	—	30	—	260	290	
Airbus A330-300	14	—	—	30	—	268	298	
Airbus A350-900	15	15	—	28	36	247	311	Deliveries from 2025.
Airbus A380-800	6	—	12	66	—	417	495	To be retired before 2030.
Boeing 777-200ER	8	—	—	22	—	278	300	
Boeing 777-200ER	8	—	—	24	—	277	301	
Boeing 777-200ER	8	—	—	24	—	278	302	
Total	67	27						

=== Gallery ===
Asiana Airlines current fleet

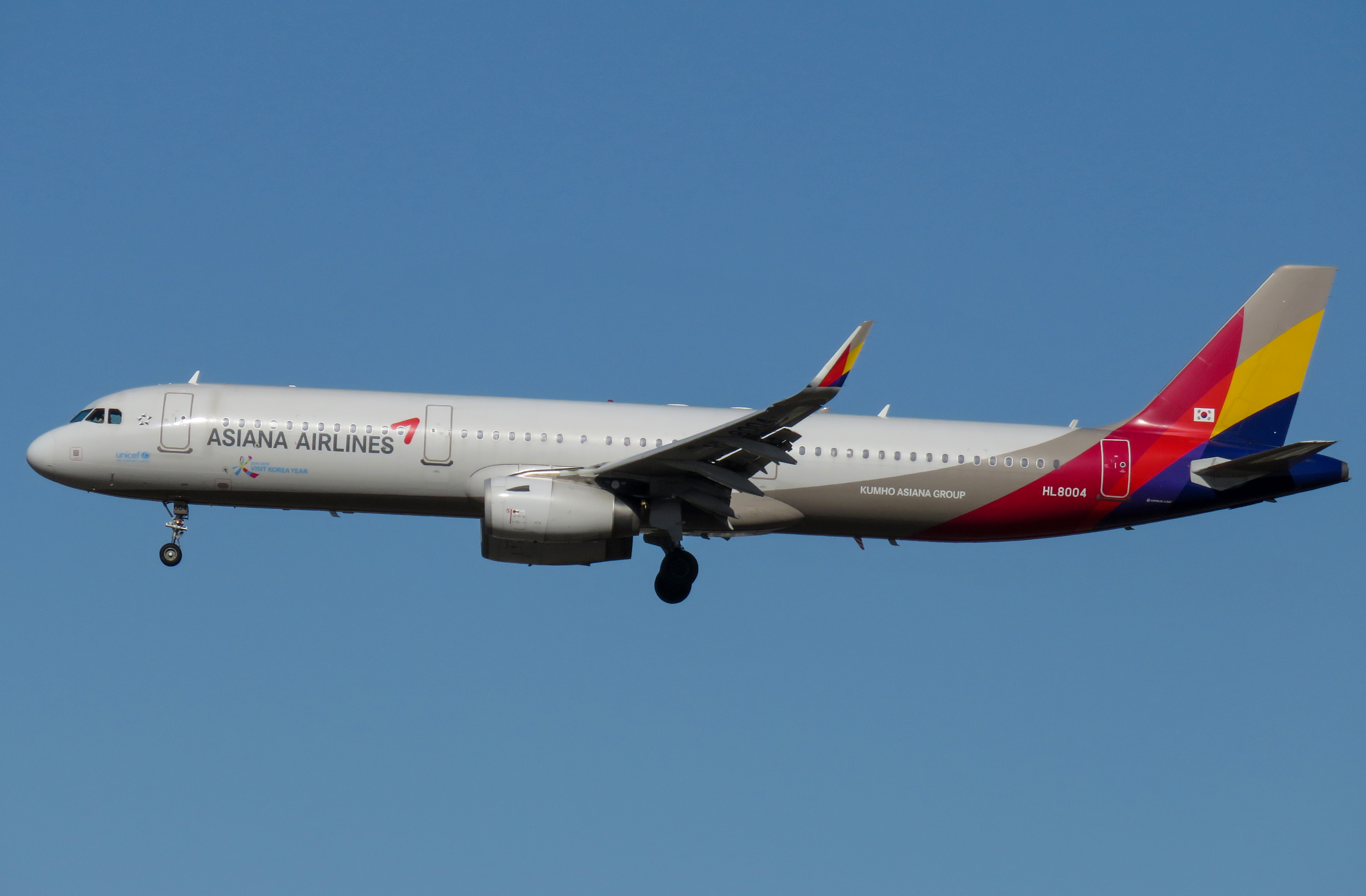
Airbus A321-200

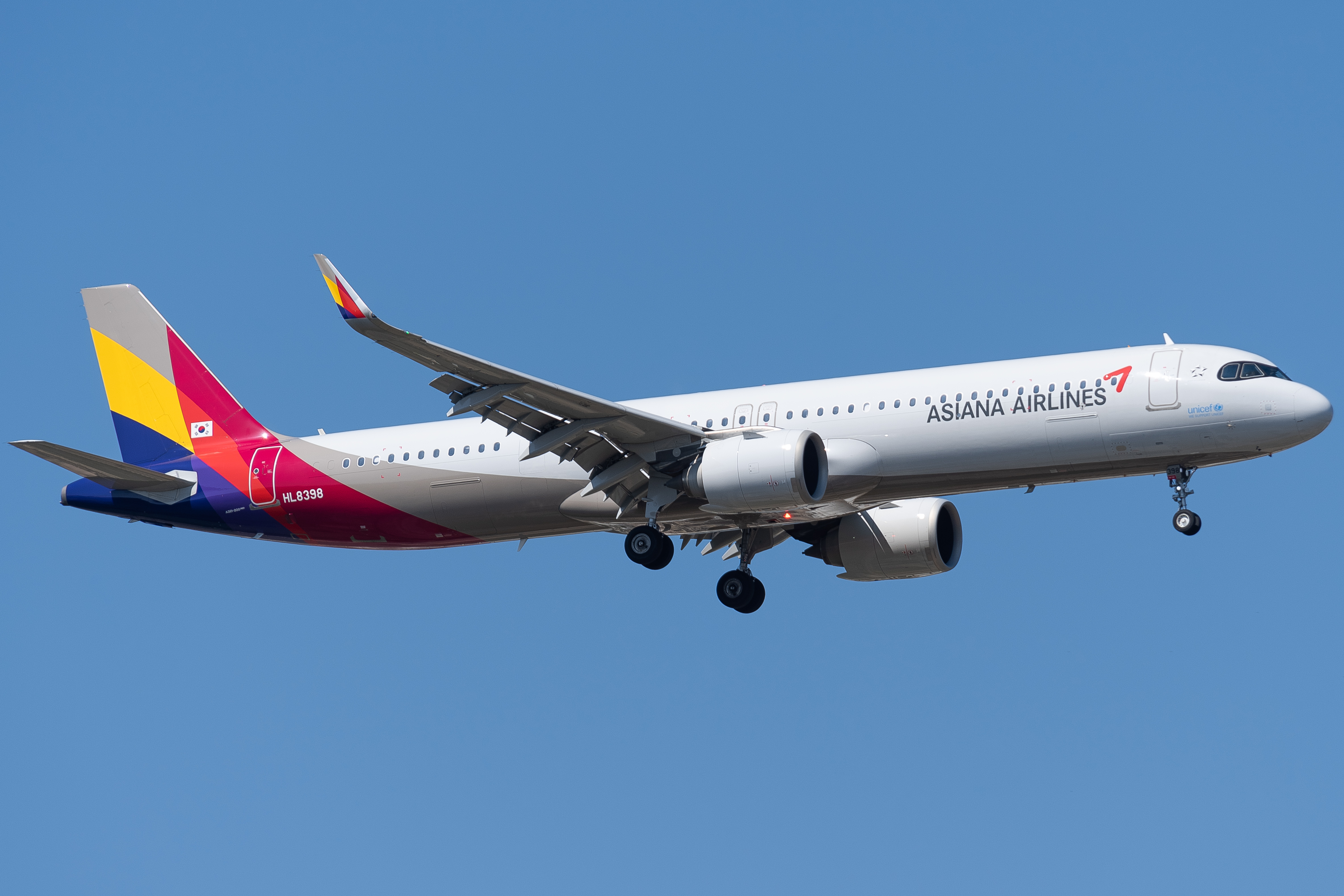
Airbus A321neo

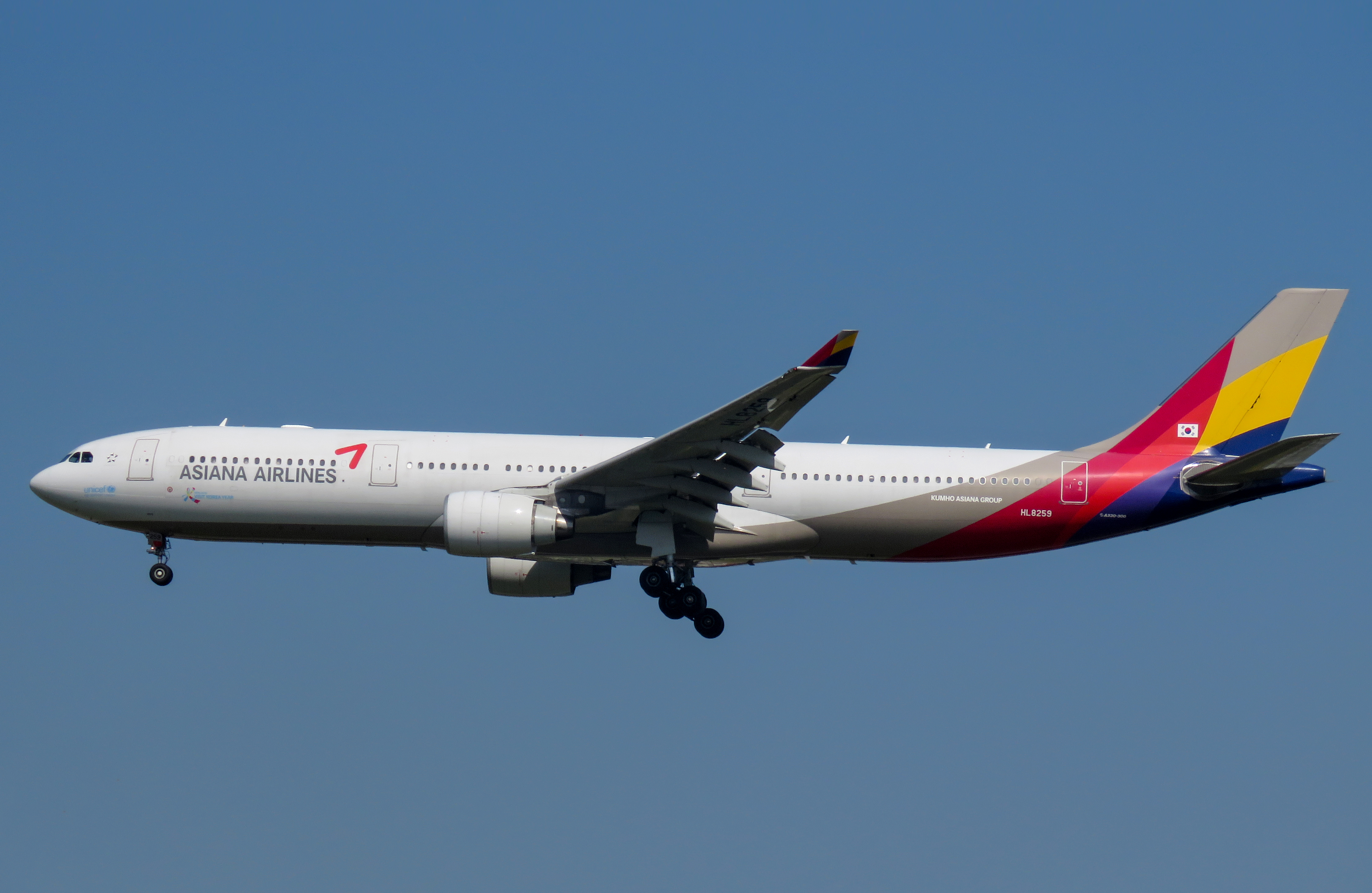
Airbus A330-300

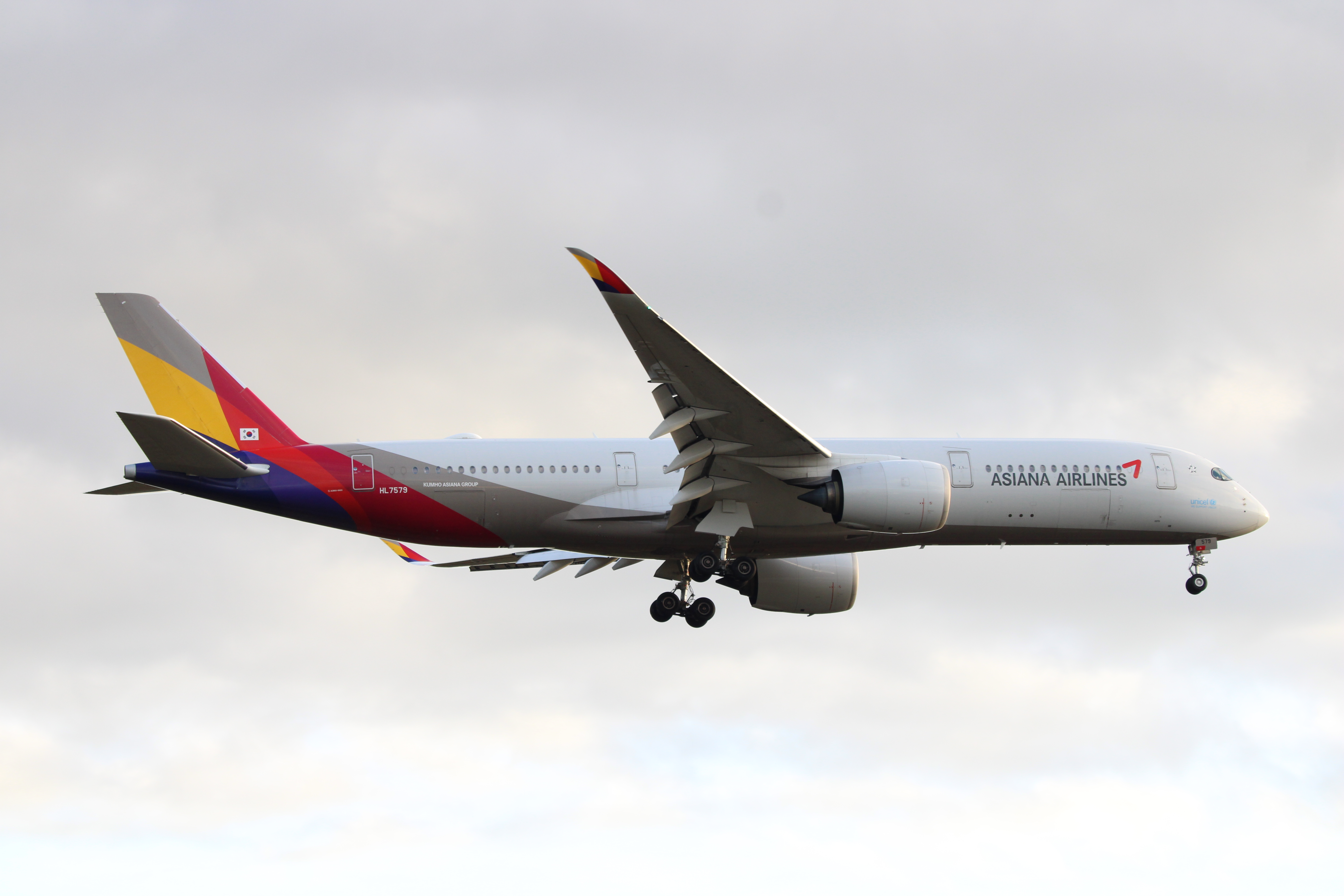
Airbus A350-900

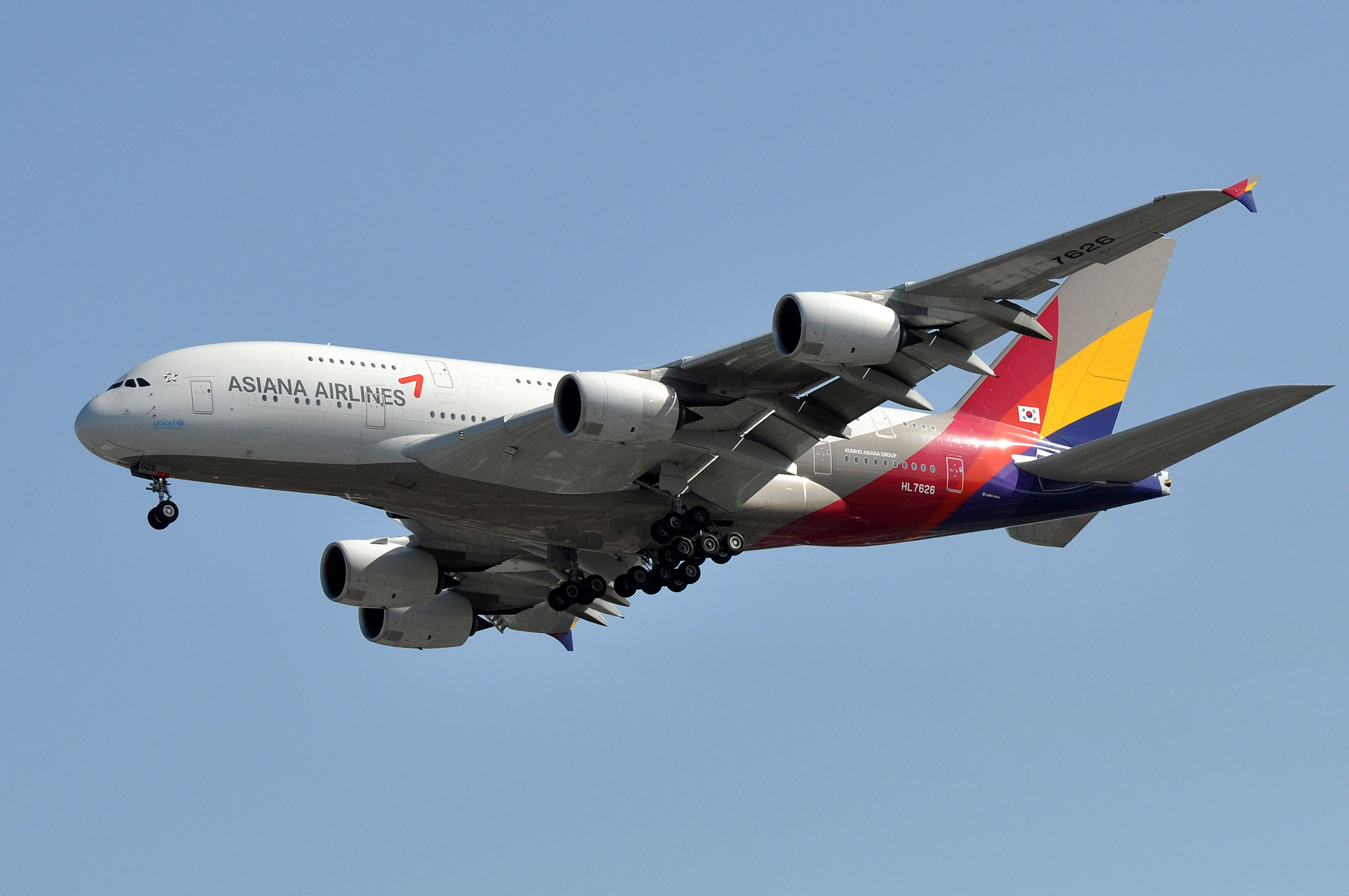
Airbus A380-800

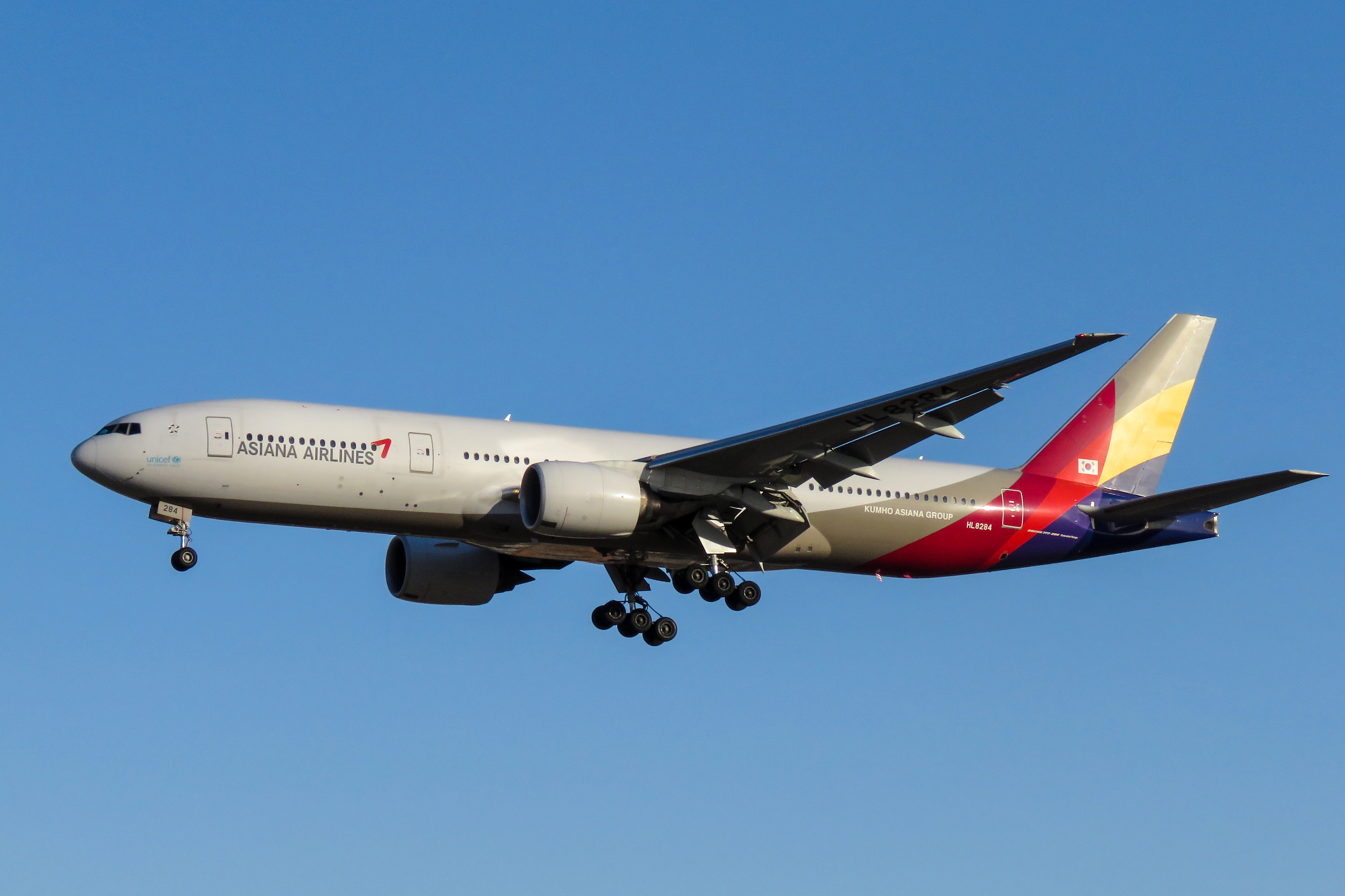
Boeing 777-200ER

=== Retired fleet ===
Asiana Airlines has previously operated the following aircraft:

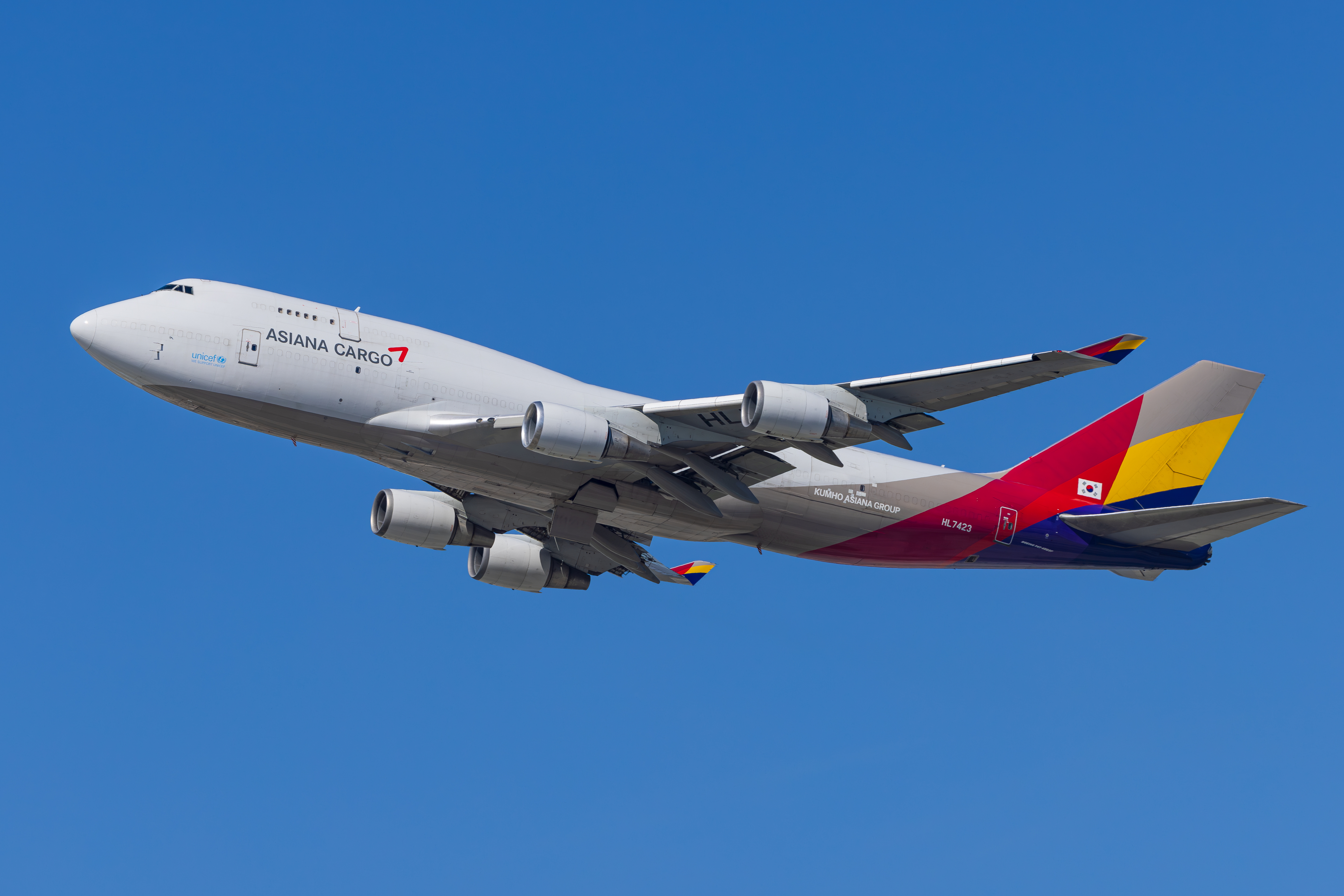
Asiana Airlines Boeing 747-400BDSF freighter

Asiana Airlines retired fleet
Aircraft	Total	Introduced	Retired	Replacement	Notes
Airbus A320-200	7	2005	2024	Airbus A321neo	
Airbus A320-200	3	2006	2014	Airbus A321neo	Transferred to subsidiary Air Busan.
Airbus A320-200	1	2007	2015	None	Crashed as flight OZ162
Airbus A321-100	4	1998	2021	Airbus A321neo	
Boeing 737-400	22	1988	2013	Airbus A320 family	
Boeing 737-400	4	1988	2013	Airbus A320 family	Transferred to subsidiary Air Busan
Boeing 737-500	3	1992	2008	Airbus A320 family	
Boeing 737-500	3	1992	2008	Airbus A320 family	Transferred to subsidiary Air Busan
Boeing 737-500	1	1992	1993	None	Crashed as flight OZ733
Boeing 747-400	3	1993	2024	Airbus A350-900; Airbus A380-800	
Boeing 747-400BDSF	2	2007	2022	None	
Boeing 747-400BDSF	5	2007	2025	None	Transferred to Air Incheon
Boeing 747-400F	2	1996	2009	None	
Boeing 747-400F	1	2006	2011	None	Crashed as flight OZ991
Boeing 747-400F	6	1996	2025	None	Transferred to Air Incheon
Boeing 747-400M	6	1991	2017	Airbus A350-900; Airbus A380-800	Converted into freighters and transferred to Asiana Cargo
Boeing 767-300	9	1990	2025	Airbus A330-300	
Boeing 767-300ER	9	1991	2006	Airbus A330-300	
Boeing 767-300F	1	1996	2025	None	Transferred to Air Incheon

== Services ==
=== Cabins ===
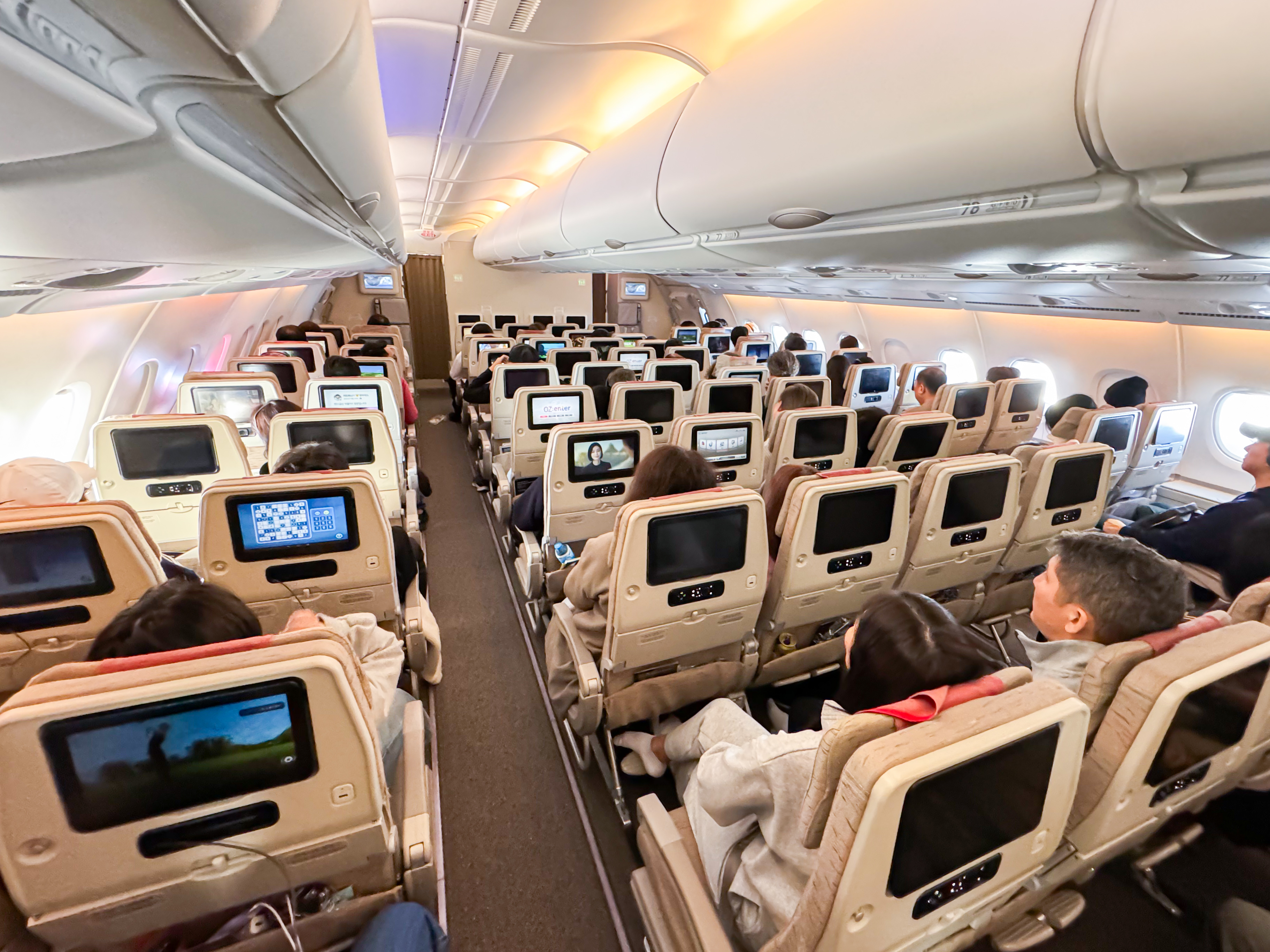
Economy class cabin on an Airbus A380-800 upper deck

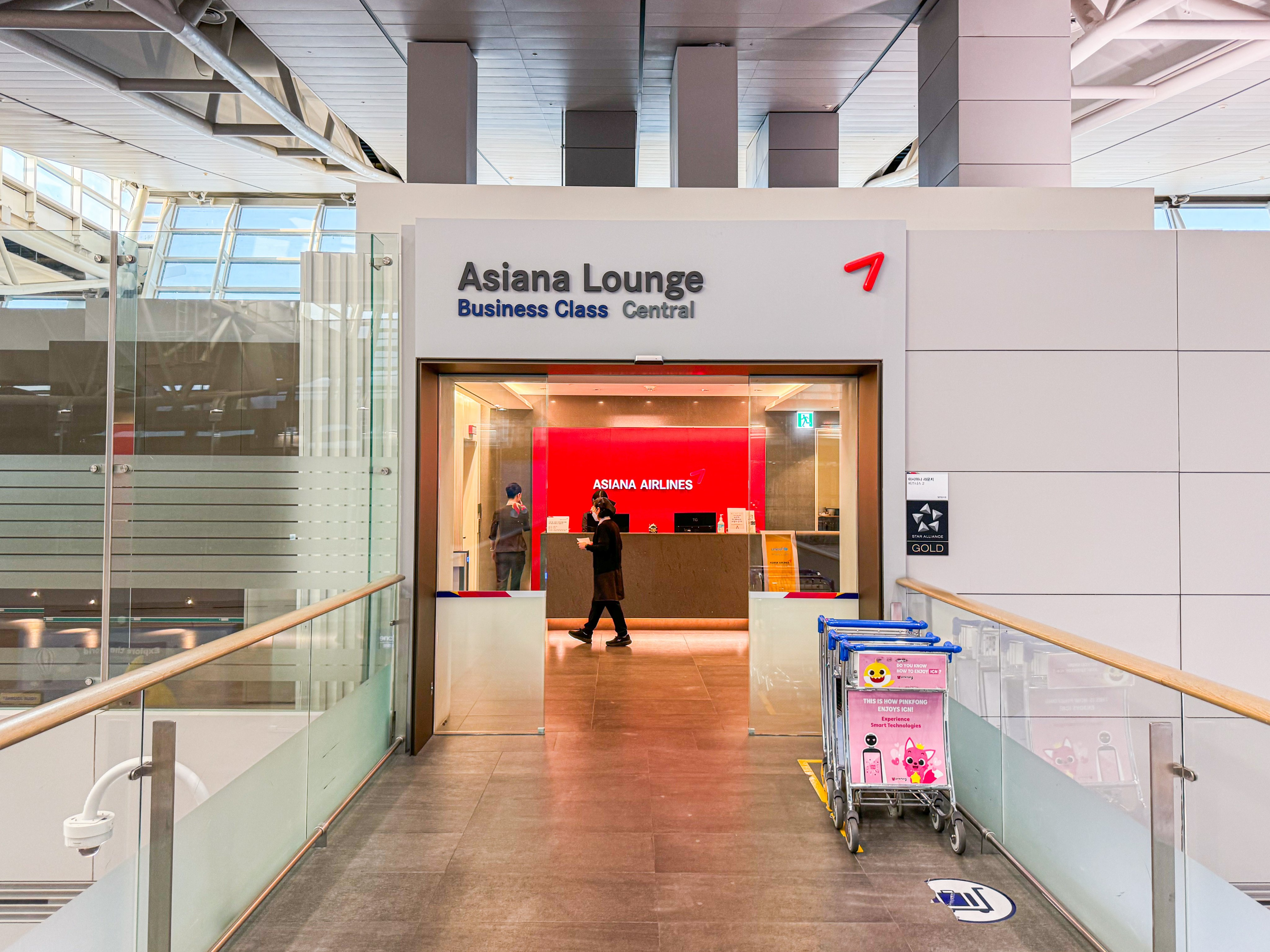
A former Asiana Lounge Central at Incheon International Airport Terminal 1

Asiana Airlines offers five classes of service – First Suite Class, First Class, Business Smartium Class, Business Class, and Travel (economy) Class. Seat configurations and in-flight entertainment systems vary by the type of aircraft and its operating routes.

First Suite class is offered on A380-800, which is serviced on routes to Los Angeles, New York City, Sydney, and Frankfurt. Both First Suite and old First Class were available on Boeing 777s but were later removed in favor of a two-class configuration. Passengers in these classes are offered pyjamas, souvenirs, and "amenity kits" containing items such as skin creams, toothpaste, eye shades, and earplugs. A passenger can pre-order in-flight meals 48 hours before departure. First-class seats are equipped with personal AVOD systems.

Besides those routes, most of Asiana's international flights offer two types of classes – business smartium class or business class as the highest class and travel class, without first class. Some of the short-length international flights and charter flights are operated on a mono-class basis, as well as all of the airline's domestic flights. Business Smartium Class is installed on Boeing 777-200ER, and Business Class is installed on A330, but some of the A330 are equipped with newly furbished cocoon seats. Most of Asiana's Travel class seats also have television or video systems. AVODs are installed on many of the aircraft and business class is fully equipped with new AVODs. In-flight entertainment systems are not offered on domestic routes, which consist of flights of an hour or less.

=== In-flight meals ===
Asiana offers complimentary meals to both economy and business class passengers on most international flights. Meals consist of both Korean dishes like Bibimbap and western dishes like Pasta.

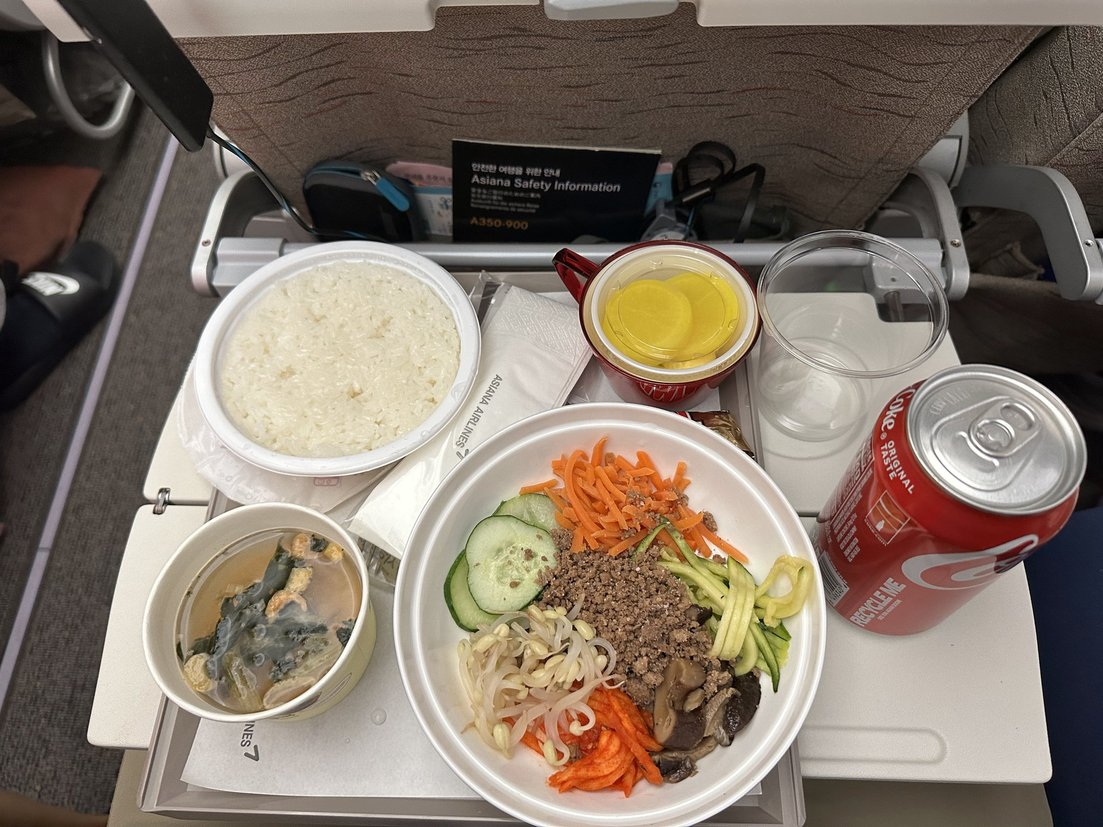
Bibimbap served on an Asiana Airlines flight

=== In-flight magazines ===
Asiana offers two in-flight magazines, Asiana (a travel magazine) and Asiana Entertainment.

=== Frequent-flyer program ===
Asiana Club is Asiana Airlines' frequent-flyer program, formerly Asiana Bonus Club. Asiana Club has five tiers: Silver, Gold, Diamond, Diamond Plus, and Platinum. To acquire or maintain each tier, members are required to accrue 0, 20000, 40000, 100000 miles in two calendar years from the 'reference date'. Status miles are based on 'On-board mileage', which includes miles accumulated by travelling with Asiana Airlines or Star Alliance airlines. Also, members can accrue miles by flying partner airlines such as Qatar Airways. As Asiana is a Star Alliance member, customers reaching certain qualifications are entitled to certain benefits which may be used across the entirety of the Star Alliance network.

=== Partnerships ===
Asiana Club Miles can be collected on all flights operated by Star Alliance member airlines, as well as Air Astana, Etihad Airways and Qatar Airways.

== Marketing ==
Asiana has endorsement deals with the following:

- Park Ji-Sung – Manchester United ambassador
- K. J. Choi – professional golfer
- Yang Yong-eun – professional golfer
- Chan-Ho Park – ex-MLB pitcher
- YG Entertainment – record label and talent agency
- JYP Entertainment – record label and talent agency
- KBS Symphony Orchestra
- Korea National Ballet

== Accidents and incidents ==
- On 26 July 1993, Asiana Airlines Flight 733, a Boeing 737-500 (HL7229) crashed in poor weather about 10 kilometers short of the runway in Mokpo while making its third landing attempt on runway 06 at Mokpo Airport. Two of the six crew members and 66 of the 110 passengers on board were killed.
- On 11 November 1998, an Asiana Airlines Boeing 747-400 was attempting a U-turn in the gate area of Ted Stevens Anchorage International Airport when the tip of its wing collided with the tail of an Ilyushin Il-62M belonging to Aeroflot. No one was injured. Asiana was subsequently sued by Aeroflot, and the Il-62M was written off.
- On 9 June 2006, Asiana Airlines Flight 8942 (Airbus A321-131) from Jeju International Airport to Gimpo International Airport encountered hail during its approach to Gimpo Airport, damaging the cockpit and radome. There were no injuries. Asiana Airlines attempted to reward the pilots, but it was discovered that the pilots had intentionally entered the clouds. In addition, when a similar accident occurred a year before this one, a pilot who was a member of a union was disciplined, but since the pilots in this accident were not members of a union, controversy arose and the rewards were eventually canceled.
- On 16 June 2011, an Airbus A321-200, operating as Asiana Airlines Flight 324 between Chengdu Shuangliu International Airport, China and Incheon International Airport, was fired upon by two soldiers of the Republic of Korea Marine Corps as it came in to land at Incheon. A total of 99 rounds were discharged at the aircraft, which was out of range and it made a safe landing without sustaining any damage. The soldiers had misidentified the aircraft as belonging to the North Korean military and were acting on orders that permitted them to engage without reference to senior officers, following the Bombardment of Yeonpyeong in November 2010.
- On 28 July 2011, Asiana Airlines Cargo Flight 991, a Boeing 747-400F bound for Shanghai Pudong International Airport from Incheon International Airport, crashed into the East China Sea off Jeju Island, South Korea, after reporting a fire in the cargo compartment. Both pilots were killed.
- On 6 July 2013, Asiana Airlines Flight 214, a Boeing 777-200ER (HL7742), crashed short of the runway while landing at San Francisco International Airport, due to pilot error, killing three of the 307 passengers on board. Two of the fatally injured passengers were not wearing their seat belts and were ejected from the aircraft during the crash. The third died in hospital a week after the incident as a result of her injuries. On 25 February 2014, Asiana Airlines was fined $500,000 by the U.S. Department of Transportation for "failing to promptly contact passengers' families and keep them informed about their loved ones" during and after the crash.
- On 14 April 2015, Asiana Airlines Flight 162, an Airbus A320 (HL7762), crash landed short of the runway at Hiroshima Airport, Japan. The aircraft spun 180 degrees and eventually stopped on the runway with a fractured wing, damage to the left engine, and all landing gear collapsed. The aircraft was operating an international scheduled passenger flight from Incheon International Airport, Seoul, South Korea. More than 20 of the 82 people on board were injured. The aircraft was written off.
- On 9 April 2019, Asiana Airlines Flight 8703, an Airbus A320-232 (HL7772), suffered a 90-degree rotation of the nosegear on landing at Gwangju Airport's runway 04R. The tires and flanges suffered serious damage.
- On 26 May 2023, a passenger opened an emergency exit as Asiana Airlines Flight 8124, an Airbus A321-200 (HL8256) was on approach to Daegu International Airport on a flight from Jeju International Airport. The emergency slide was deployed and ripped off. The aircraft landed safely, but at least six people were injured and taken to hospital. The passenger who opened the exit door was arrested.

== See also ==
- Transport in South Korea
- List of companies of South Korea
- List of airlines of South Korea
- List of airports in South Korea
- List of Asian airline holding companies
