= Asiana Airlines Flight 733 =

1993 plane crash in South Korea

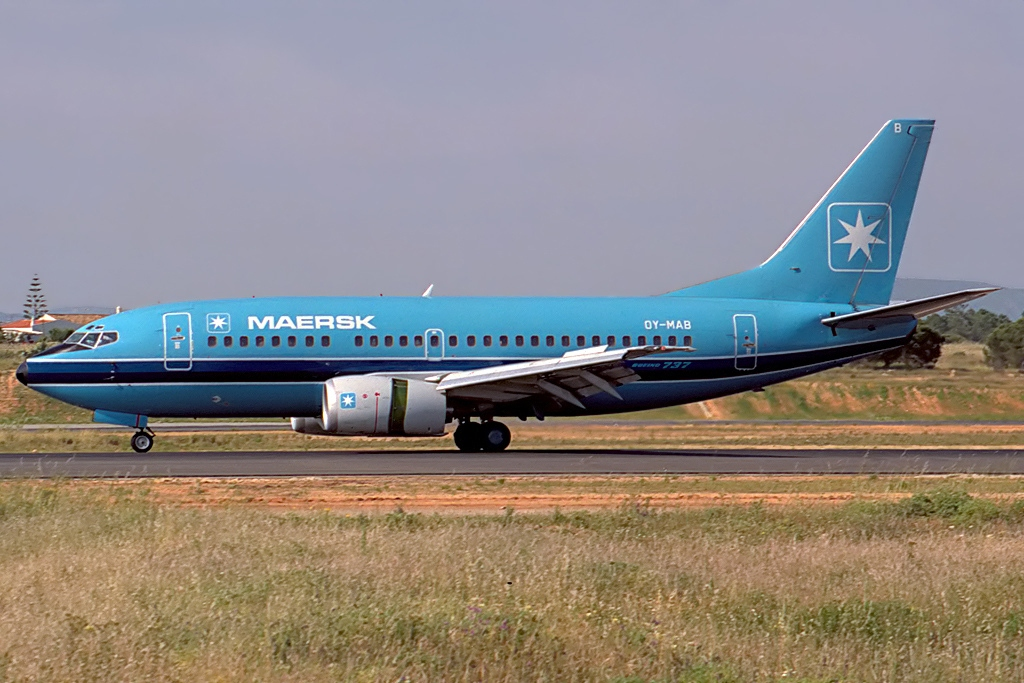
- The aircraft involved in the accident, photographed in 1990 while in service with Maersk Air

Accident
- Date: 26 July 1993
- Summary: Controlled flight into terrain due to pilot error
- Site: Ungeo Mountain, near Mokpo Airport, South Korea; 34°42′31″N 126°18′39″E

Aircraft
- Aircraft type: Boeing 737-5L9
- Operator: Asiana Airlines
- IATA flight No.: OZ733
- ICAO flight No.: AAR733
- Call sign: ASIANA 733
- Registration: HL7229
- Flight origin: Seoul-Gimpo International Airport
- Destination: Mokpo Airport
- Occupants: 116
- Passengers: 110
- Crew: 6
- Fatalities: 68
- Injuries: 48
- Survivors: 48

Asiana Airlines Flight 733 was a domestic Asiana Airlines passenger flight from Seoul-Gimpo International Airport to Mokpo Airport, South Korea. The Boeing 737-500 operating the flight crashed on 26 July 1993, in the Hwawon area of Haenam County, South Jeolla Province. The cause of the accident was determined to be pilot error leading to controlled flight into terrain. 68 of the 116 passengers and crew members on board were killed. The crash resulted in the first hull loss of a 737-500.

== Background ==
=== Aircraft ===
The aircraft involved was a Boeing 737-5L9, (Note: The aircraft was a Boeing 737-500 model; Boeing assigns a unique customer code for each company that buys one of its aircraft, which is applied as a suffix to the model number at the time the aircraft is built. The code for Maersk Air is "L9", hence "737-5L9".) MSN 24805, registered as HL7229, was manufactured in 1990. It had logged approximately 7301 airframe hours and 5707 takeoff and landing cycles. It was equipped with two CFM International CFM56-3B1 engines.

On approach to Mokpo the aircraft struck Mount Ungeo, which is 320 m (1,050 ft) high, at an altitude of 240 m (800 ft). Mokpo Airport was not equipped with any precision approaches; it was only equipped with a VOR/DME.

=== Passengers and crew ===
There were three Japanese nationals and two American nationals among the passengers, many of whom were heading for a popular summer resort on the Yellow Sea according to the airline. The captain was Hwang In-ki (Korean: 황인기; Hanja: 黃仁淇), and the first officer was Park Tae-hwan (박태환; 朴台煥). There were four flight attendants on board.

Nationality	Passengers	Crew	Total
South Korea	105	6	111
Japan	3	-	3
United States	2	-	2
Total	110	6	116

== Accident ==
On 26 July 1993, flight 733 departed Gimpo International Airport in Seoul, bound for Mokpo Airport, for a scheduled arrival at 15:15. At that time, the weather conditions in Mokpo and Yeongam County area consisted of heavy rain and wind. However, the weather conditions were not enough to delay the arrival time. The flight planned to land on runway 06. The aircraft made its first landing attempt at 15:24, which failed, followed by a second landing attempt at 15:28, which also failed. At 15:38, after two failed landing attempts, the aircraft made a third attempt. The twin-engine plane then disappeared from the radar at 15:41. At 15:48 the aircraft crashed into a ridge, Mt. Ungeo, at 240 m (800 ft) above sea level. At 15:50, the wreckage was found near Masanri, Haenam County, South Jeolla Province about 10 km (6.2 mi; 5.4 nmi) southwest of Mokpo Airport. The news was reported by two surviving passengers who escaped from the wreckage and ran to the Hwawon-myeon branch of the village below the mountain.

== Cause ==
After the crash, Asiana Airlines announced that the plane had been delayed by three landing attempts and that it appeared to have crashed. The runways did not have an ILS installed. Mokpo Airport was equipped with only a VOR/DME, resulting in the pilots performing multiple landing attempts, contributing to the accident. A prosecutor in charge of investigating the accident concluded that the aircraft, having disappeared from the normal flight route, had made an unintentional landing with the pilots having misunderstood the situation. Both pilots were killed in the crash. Chung Jong-hwan, the director general of the Ministry of Transportation, said that captain Hwang's actions caused the crash. An inquiry found pilot error was the cause of the crash when the plane began a descent while it was still passing over a mountain peak. The flight recorders were found and they recorded that after the third attempt, the crew told the control tower that the aircraft was veering off course. According to the cockpit voice recorder (CVR), captain Hwang flew the aircraft below the minimum safe altitude (1,600 ft (490 m)), as he said, "okay, eight hundred," a few seconds before impact.

== Aftermath ==
This was Asiana Airlines' first fatal (and as of 2025, deadliest) aircraft crash. After the accident, Asiana suspended the Gimpo - Mokpo route. The airline paid compensation to the families of the victims. At the time, the transportation department was planning to build Muan International Airport in Muan County, Jeolla Province. When Muan International Airport was opened in 2007, Mokpo Airport was closed and converted into a military base. The accident also caused Asiana to cancel their order of Boeing 757-200s and instead order the Airbus A321.

Flight 733 was the deadliest aviation accident in South Korea at that time. It was surpassed by Air China Flight 129, which crashed on 15 April 2002, with 129 fatalities. It was also the deadliest accident involving a Boeing 737-500 at that time. It was surpassed by Aeroflot Flight 821, which crashed on 14 September 2008, with 88 fatalities. As of 29 December 2024, Flight 733 remains the second deadliest accident involving a Boeing 737-500, and the third deadliest aviation accident in South Korea, behind Jeju Air Flight 2216 and Air China Flight 129. Coincidentally, the former occurred at Muan International Airport, the airport which replaced Flight 733's intended destination: Mokpo Airport.

As of March 2026, Asiana Airlines still uses flight number 733 for the late evening Seoul-Incheon–Hanoi route which utilizes an Airbus A350-941 aircraft.

== See also ==
- Ground proximity warning system
