= Asiana Airlines Flight 991 =

2011 aviation accident in the East China Sea

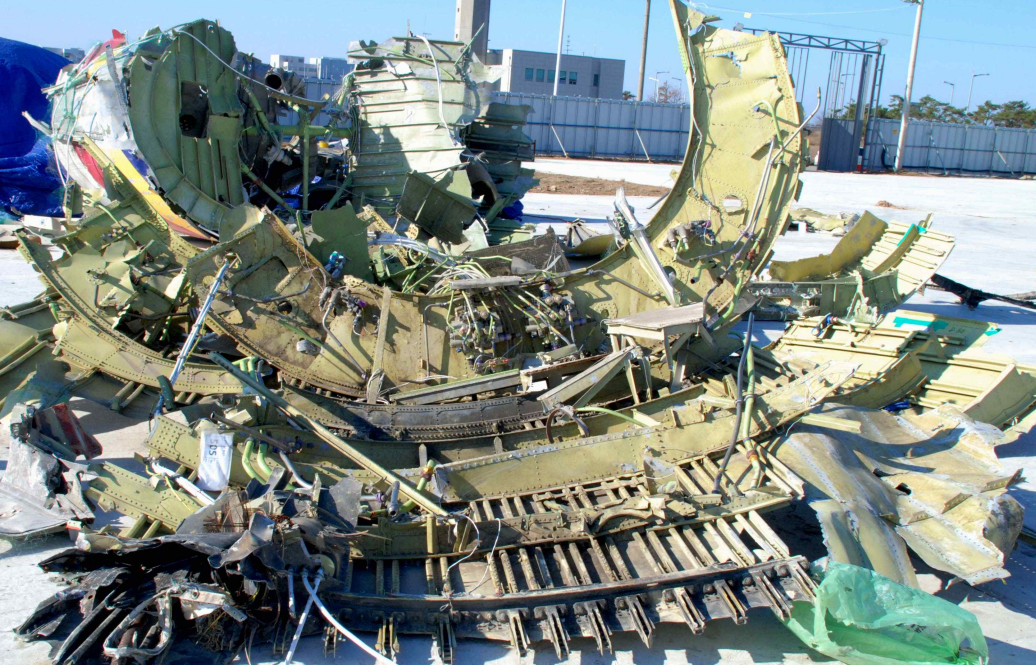
- Recovered aircraft wreckage

Accident
- Date: 28 July 2011
- Summary: Crashed into the sea following in-flight fire of undetermined cause leading to In-flight breakup
- Site: East China Sea, 130 km (81.3 miles) west off Jeju Island, South Korea; 33°15′4.56″N 124°59′31.02″E

Aircraft
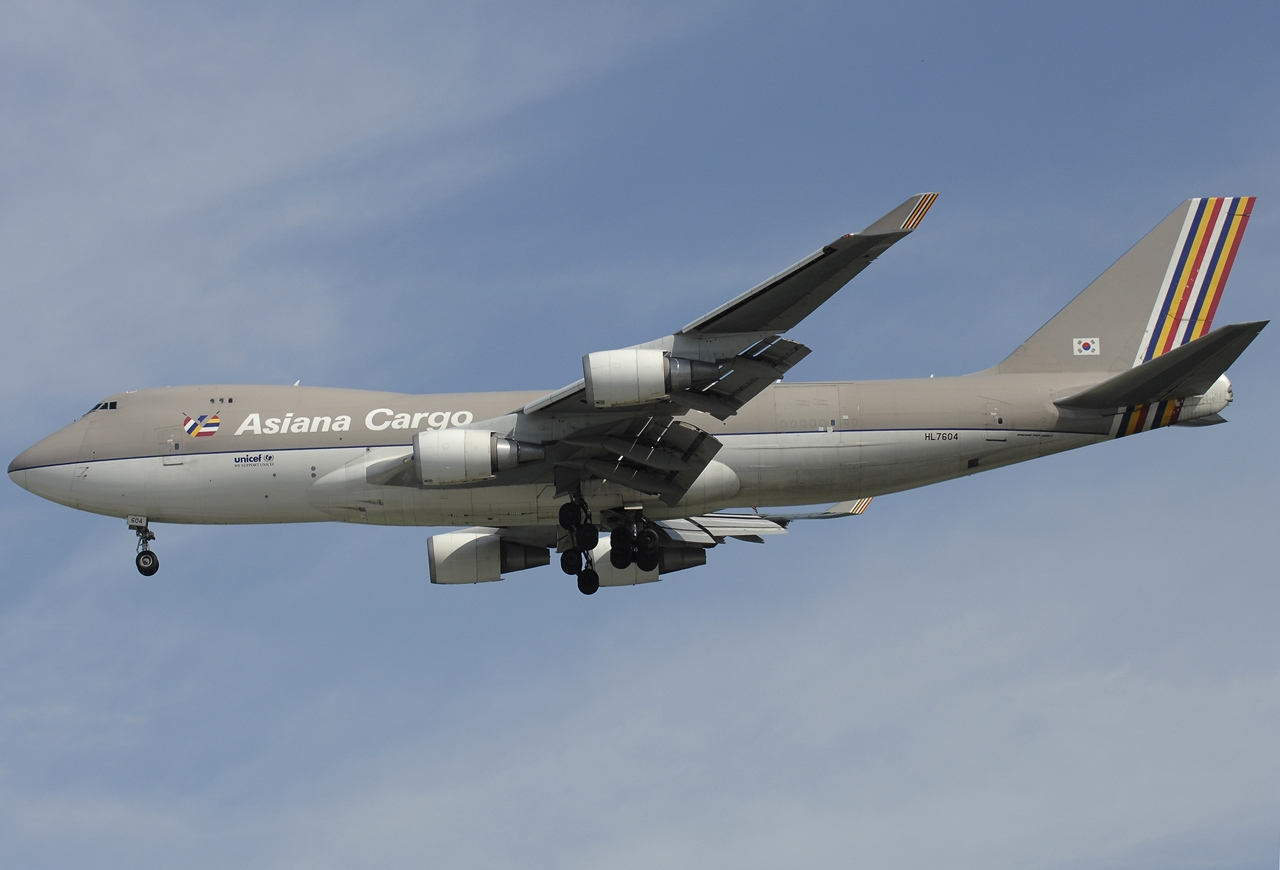
- HL7604, the aircraft involved in the accident, seen in 2010
- Aircraft type: Boeing 747-48EF
- Operator: Asiana Airlines Cargo
- IATA flight No.: OZ991
- ICAO flight No.: AAR991
- Call sign: ASIANA 991
- Registration: HL7604
- Flight origin: Incheon International Airport, Seoul, South Korea
- Destination: Shanghai Pudong International Airport, Shanghai, China
- Occupants: 2
- Crew: 2
- Fatalities: 2
- Survivors: 0

Asiana Airlines Flight 991 was a cargo flight operated by Asiana Airlines. On 28 July 2011, the Boeing 747-400 flying from Seoul, South Korea, to Shanghai, China, crashed into the sea about 81 miles west off of the coast of Jeju Island after suffering an in-flight cargo fire. Both pilots, the only two people on board, were killed. The accident marked the second loss of a 747 freighter due to a cargo hold fire in less than a year, following the crash of UPS Airlines Flight 6 in Dubai in September 2010.

== Background ==
=== Aircraft ===
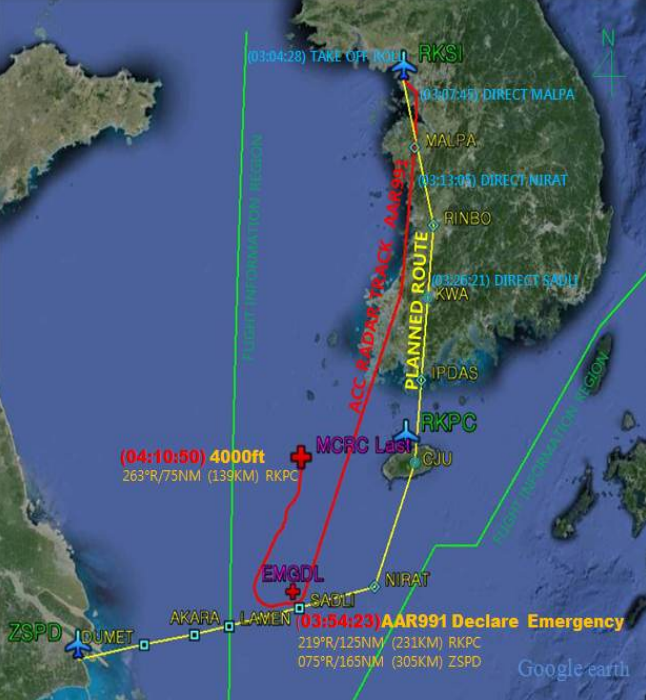
The flight path of Flight 991

The aircraft involved, manufactured in 2006, was a Boeing 747-48EF registered as HL7604, the 1370th 747 built. It first flew on 15 February 2006, and was delivered to Asiana Airlines a week later. In its five years of service, the aircraft had flown more than 28,752 flight hours in 4,799 takeoff/landing cycles. It was equipped with four General Electric CF6-80C2B1F engines and its maintenance history did not reveal anything significant during the accident investigation.

=== Crew ===
Flight 991 was crewed by two pilots: Captain Choi Sang-gi, aged 52, with 14,123 logged flight hours (including 6,896 on the Boeing 747) and First Officer Lee Jeong-woong, aged 43, with 5,211 logged flight hours (including 492 on the Boeing 747). The aircraft took off from Incheon International Airport at 03:04 local time on 28 July bound for Shanghai Pudong International Airport.

== Accident ==
The aircraft was loaded with 58 tonnes of cargo, the majority of which consisted of semiconductors, mobile phones, liquid crystal displays, and light-emitting diodes. The remaining 400 kg (880 lb) of cargo consisted of lithium batteries, paint and photoresist fluid.

At 03:54, while cruising at 34,000 feet (10,000 m), the crew contacted air traffic control (ATC) reporting a fire on board, requesting an immediate descent and diversion to Jeju Airport, South Korea, for an emergency landing.

The aircraft was observed on radar descending towards 8,000 feet (2,400 m) at 04:01 and then erratically climbing and descending for the following nine minutes, reaching an altitude of almost 15,000 feet (4,600 m). In their last communications to ATC, the crew reported heavy vibrations and loss of flight controls. After a steep descent to 4,000 feet (1,200 m), radio contact was lost at 04:11, when the aircraft was 130 km (80 mi) west of Jeju Island.

== Search ==
Search-and-rescue operations conducted by the Republic of Korea Coast Guard recovered parts of the aircraft within a day of the crash. The search effort involved a total of 10 ships from the Coast Guard, the Navy, and the Korea Hydrographic and Oceanographic Administration, as well as three helicopters. The South Korean government also requested the assistance of Singapore and the U.S. Navy.

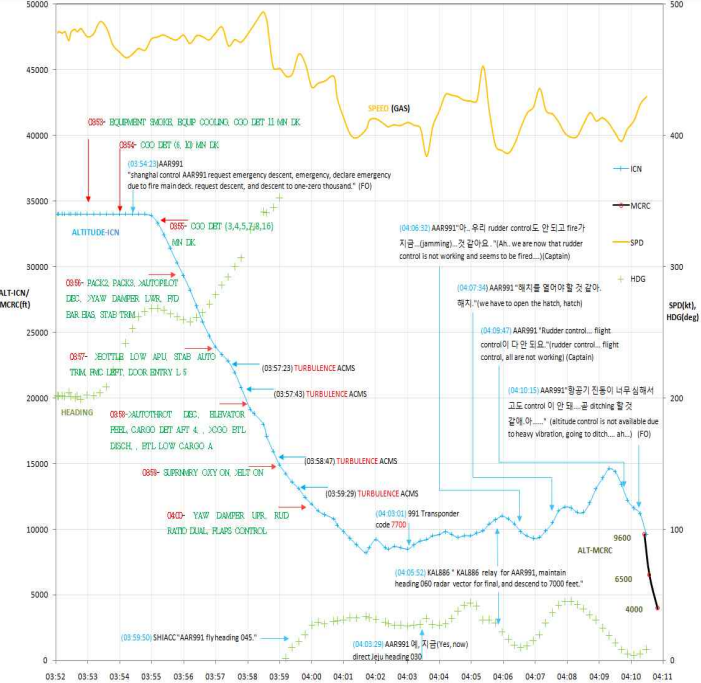
Important aspect of the flight

On 17 August, the search team identified the location of 39 parts of the aircraft lying on the sea floor at a depth of around 80 m (250 ft). Among them was the tail section, which was expected to contain the flight data recorder (FDR) and cockpit voice recorder (CVR), but both boxes had broken off their mounting brackets. The bodies of the two crewmembers were recovered on 29 October.

The FDR was finally found in May 2012, but the memory module had detached from the FDR chassis, potentially by heavy sea waves, so nothing useful could be used. The CVR was never found.

== Investigation ==
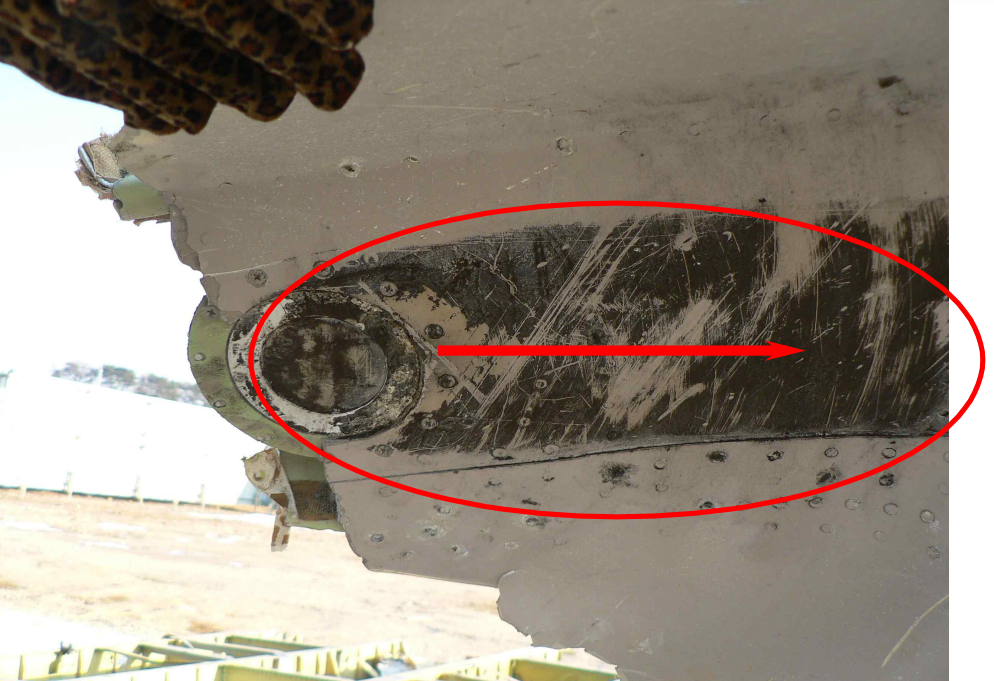
Soot (which indicates a fire) being shown off of the cockpit smoke evacuation shutter

The South Korean Aviation and Railway Accident Investigation Board (ARAIB) conducted the investigation, but due to the loss of both flight recorders, it could not fully determine the causes of the fire nor the exact sequence of events prior to the impact with the sea. From the distribution of fire and heat damage on the recovered debris, a fire was found to have started in or near one of the ULD pallets containing dangerous goods in the rear fuselage, but not enough evidence was found to determine exactly what caused the fire.

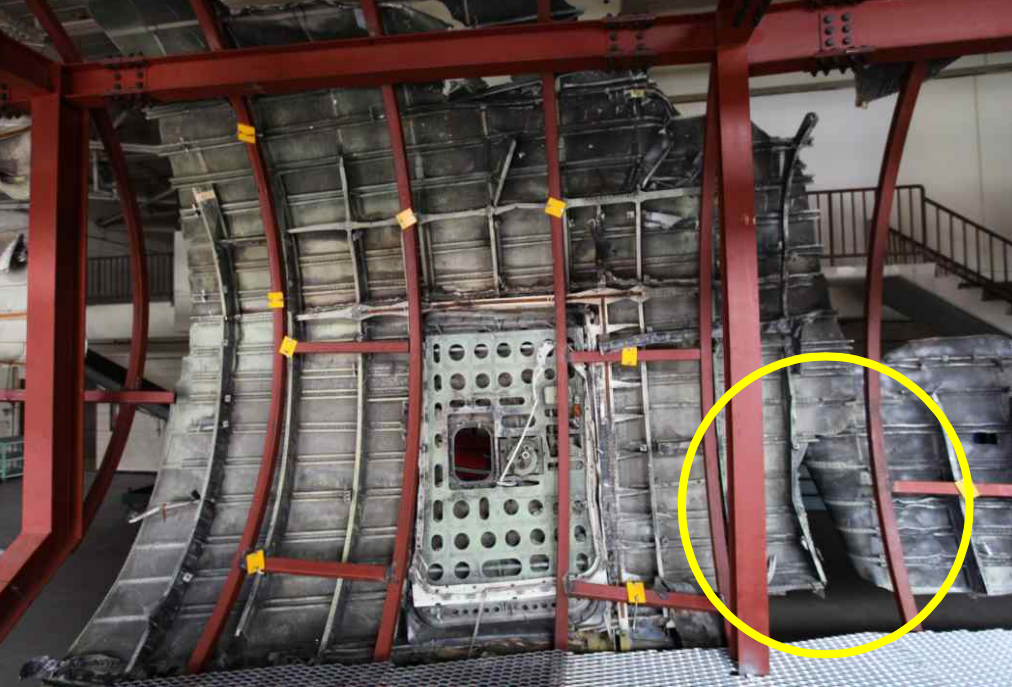
The highlighted area indicates evidence of an in-flight breakup due to the fire.

The fire was not contained and quickly propagated forward to the rest of the fuselage. Fire damage and soot were found in the air conditioning ducts that run along the fuselage and on ceiling panels near the cockpit area. The cockpit smoke evacuation vent displayed traces of soot, indicating that smoke had entered the cockpit. Some electronic components that were part of the cargo were found embedded in the wing's upper surface, together with traces of paint and photoresist, suggesting that at some point, the flammable liquids transported in one of the pallets ignited, causing an explosion that blew out portions of the fuselage in midair.

It was estimated that only 18 minutes had elapsed from the moment the fire was first detected to the final impact with the sea. The crew likely would not have been able to extinguish the fire or safely land the plane within that time frame.

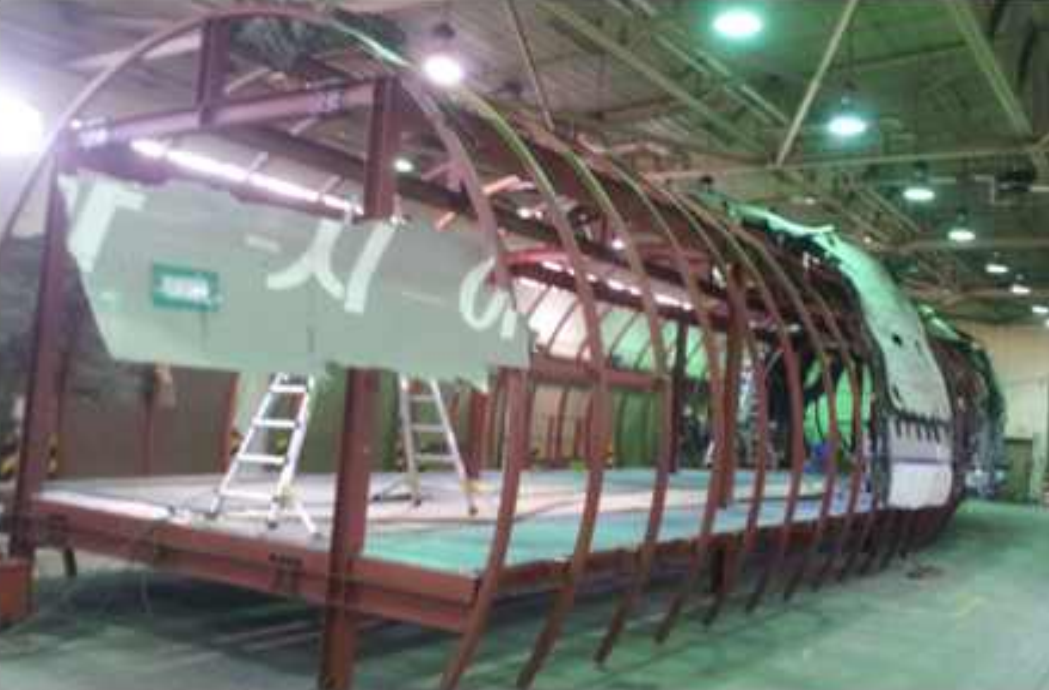
Flight 991 being reconstructed

== Aftermath ==
According to Asiana, the crash of Flight 991 led to damages to the airline of about US$190 million (200.4 billion won). In 2012, the International Civil Aviation Organization considered applying new safety standards to air carriage of lithium batteries as a result of this and the preceding crash of UPS Airlines Flight 6.
