= Asiana Airlines Flight 162 =

2015 aviation accident in Japan

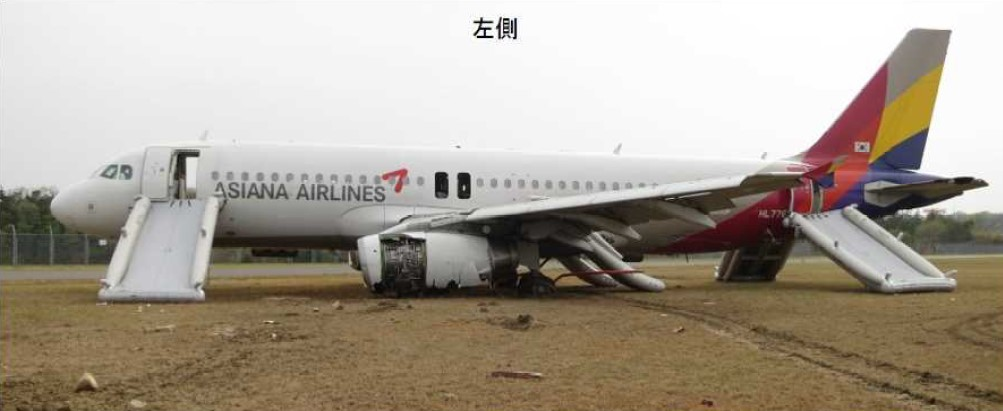
- The aircraft after the incident

Accident
- Date: 14 April 2015
- Summary: Descent below final approach path and impact with ground structures due to pilot error and poor training
- Site: Hiroshima Airport, Mihara, Hiroshima, Japan; 34°26′5.35″N 132°55′11.52″E

Aircraft
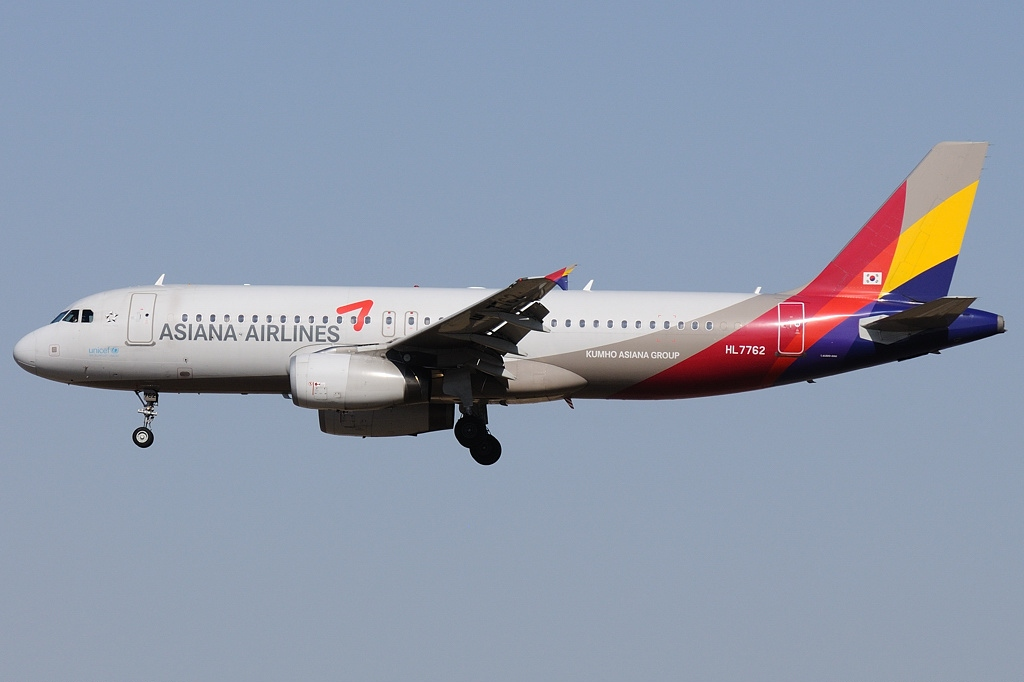
- HL7762, the aircraft involved in the accident, photographed in 2011
- Aircraft type: Airbus A320-232
- Operator: Asiana Airlines
- IATA flight No.: OZ162
- ICAO flight No.: AAR162
- Call sign: ASIANA 162
- Registration: HL7762
- Flight origin: Incheon International Airport, South Korea
- Destination: Hiroshima Airport, Japan
- Occupants: 82
- Passengers: 74
- Crew: 8
- Fatalities: 0
- Injuries: 27
- Survivors: 82

Asiana Airlines Flight 162 was a regular short-haul international passenger flight from Incheon International Airport near Seoul, South Korea, to Hiroshima Airport in Hiroshima, Japan. On 14 April 2015, the Airbus A320 aircraft touched down short of the runway, struck the localizer array, skidded onto the runway on its tail, and spun 120 degrees before finally coming to a rest on the grass, opposite the terminal building. The aircraft suffered substantial damage to the left wing and engine. Of the 82 people aboard, 27 occupants (25 passengers and 2 crew) were injured, one seriously.

== Aircraft and crew ==
The aircraft involved, an Airbus A320-200 registration HL7762, was delivered new to Asiana Airlines in 2007, making the aircraft seven years old at the time of the accident. The aircraft was written off as a result of the accident.

The 47-year-old captain had 8,242 flight hours, including 1,318 hours on the Airbus A320. The 35-year-old co-pilot had 1,588 flight hours, with 1,298 of them on the Airbus A320. Both pilots had previous experience in landing at Hiroshima Airport, but Flight 162 was their first flight with each other. Actual names of the crew were not disclosed.

== Accident ==
Landing path of Flight 162 at Hiroshima

The transport ministry's Osaka Regional Civil Aviation Bureau stated that the crew tried to land the aircraft in darkness and inclement weather without access to an instrument landing system. At this airport, aircraft normally approach from the west because the instrument landing system is installed only at the eastern end of the runway. On this occasion, the pilot was instructed by an air traffic controller to approach from the east due to the wind direction. Bureau officials were reported to have stated that the pilot attempted to land in poor weather with low visibility while using such aids as the lighting near the centre-line of the runway that indicates glide angles (normally used in good weather conditions).

At 18:58 Japan Standard Time (JST), while cruising at flight level (FL) 33,000 feet (10,000 m) the first officer received the weather conditions at Hiroshima. The captain, who was the pilot flying, gave an approach briefing, stating he intended to land on runway 10 using radar vectors from air traffic control (ATC). He also warned the first officer about runway 28, as the full length of that runway was not visible from the threshold, and advised him to speak up if there were any concerns. The first officer then received the Automatic Terminal Information System (ATIS) which stated that runway 28 was the active runway and that aircraft were using the RNAV (area navigation) approach and told the relayed information to the captain. The crew decided to land on runway 28.

The first officer then configured the Flight management system for the approach. The aircraft then began to descend from its cruising altitude. The captain then gave a second briefing, saying that he would configure the aircraft for landing before reaching the final approach fix (FAF) and acknowledged the new information in the FMC. At 19:57 the approach controller told Flight 162 to expect radar vectors to the waypoint (and the intermediate approach fix (IF)) VISTA. Two minutes later, Flight 162 was cleared for an RNAV approach to runway 28. At 20:00, Flight 162 was transferred to the tower controller, who cleared the flight to land. The landing gear was then lowered, the flaps were extended to full, and the landing checklist was carried out. After completing the landing checklist, the captain gave a go-around briefing, stating that TO/GA thrust would be used and the flaps would be retracted one position at a time. At 20:03, the flight crew discussed concern about the runway's appearance, as recorded on the aircraft's cockpit voice recorder (CVR):

Captain: "The runway looks strange."
First officer: "Yes, a little bit awkward."
Captain: "It means we might have some cloud in there?"

The captain then disengaged the autopilot. Recovered flight data shows that, after autopilot disconnect, the aircraft began a slow and controlled descent below the normal glide slope approach path about 4 kilometres (2.5 mi; 2.2 nmi) before impact. At 20:04, the first officer made two more comments about the weather saying "ah, It looks a bit ambiguous due to cloud, sir," and "wow, getting invisible in a second," at 20:04:14 and 20:04:39 respectively. At 20:04:42, the aircraft was at 1,484 feet (452 m) according to the Flight Data Recorder (FDR). The CVR recorded the following at this time:

Enhanced Ground Proximity Warning System (EGPWS): "Minimum."
First officer: "Minimum."
Captain: "Continue."
First officer: "Ah. Runway not in sight."
Captain: "Wait a second. Shoot, wait a second. We have RA [radio altimeter] is there-"
First officer "Yes, nine hundred, eight hundred."
Captain: "Please keep your eye on RA."
First officer: "Yes, six hundred, five hundred. Five hundred." (RA height
EGPWS: "Four hundred. Three hundred. Two hundred." (Actual height (above ground level))
First officer: "Five hundred."

At 20:05:11, the captain initiated a go-around and pulled the side-stick to full nose aft.

Captain: "No runway, go-around."
First officer: "Yes. Go-around."
EGPWS: "Forty."
First officer: "Yes."
Cockpit area microphone (CAM): [Sound of impact]
End of recording

Three seconds after the go-around was initiated, the aircraft struck the localizer 325 metres (355 yd; 1,066 ft) before the runway threshold in a nose-high attitude 148 metres (162 yd; 486 ft) short of the runway, with the main gear making contact with the ground 12 metres (39 ft) further on. After exiting the runway, the aircraft rotated until it came to rest facing the direction it had landed from.

== Investigation ==
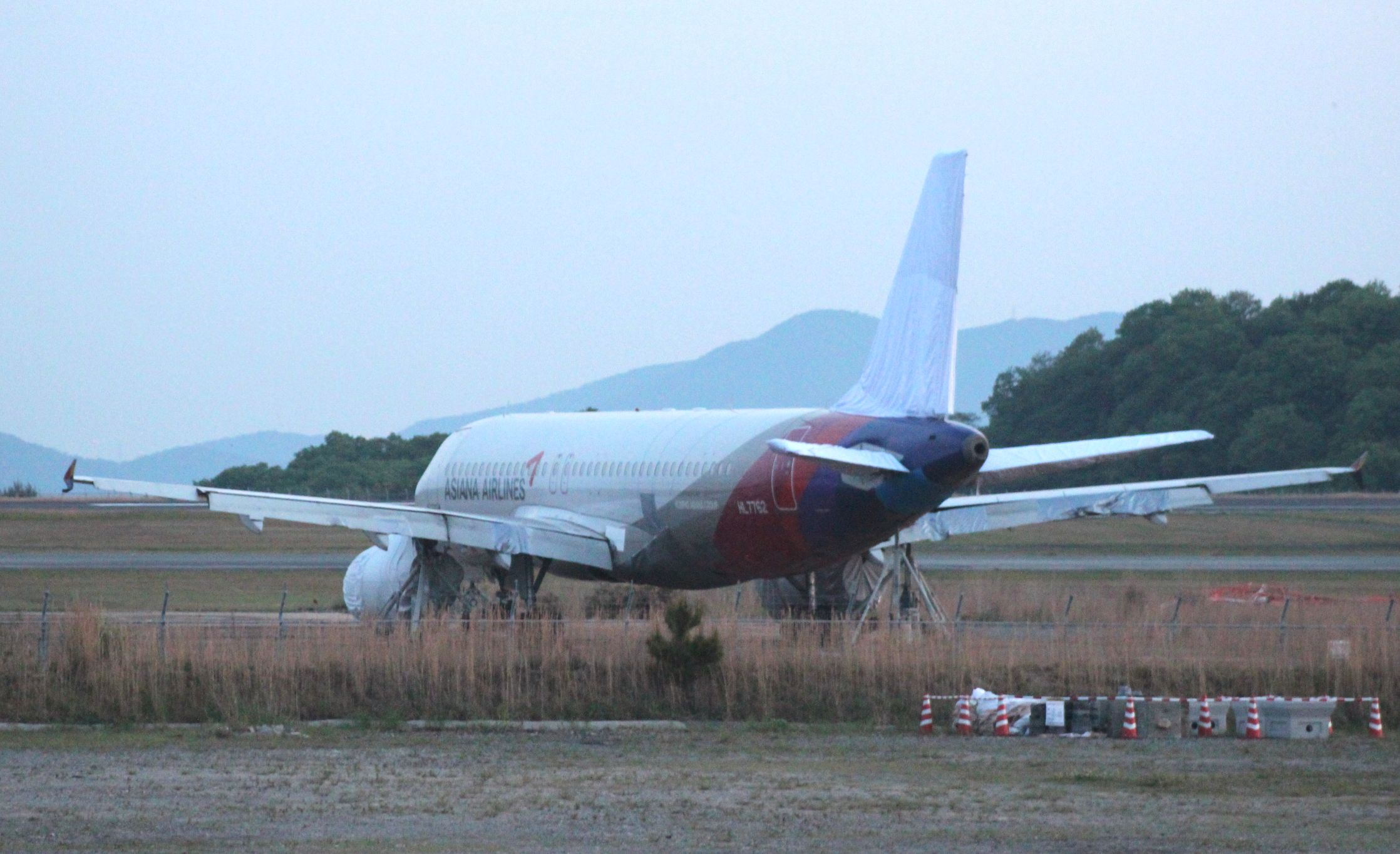
The aircraft in open storage at Hiroshima Airport following the accident

The Japanese Transportation Safety Board (JTSB) opened an investigation into the accident. Hiroshima Prefecture Prefectural police also launched an investigation on 15 April. South Korean investigators and airline officials traveled to Japan to join the investigation on 15 April.

On 16 April, investigators began debriefing the captain and first officer. One investigator from the JTSB stated that a downdraft during approach may have contributed to the inadequate altitude at the runway threshold. The METAR (weather conditions) for the time did not indicate any unusual weather or wind shear. The weather was low overcast with almost no wind. The captain stated to investigators that he had not lost sight of the runway during the approach, but initiated a go-around as an instrument showed the aircraft deviating to the right. The first officer, on the other hand, stated that he did lose sight of the runway and should have initiated a go-around after losing sight of it, but instead read the radio altimeters at the captain's request.

The JTSB released its final report on 18 November 2016. The report determined that the probable cause of the accident was the captain's failure to immediately initiate a go-around when visual cues were lost, the first officer's failure to challenge the captain's performance (both of which did not follow to Standard Operating Procedures), lack of crew resource management (CRM) and Asiana Airlines' insufficient training. The JTSB's issued two safety recommendations to Asiana Airlines, both of which urged the airline to improve its flight crew training; the first recommendation stated that the airline should reinforce the importance of flight crew's adherence to SOP's, while the second instructed the airline to implement training for pilots in awareness with visual references and appropriately using flight instruments when necessary.

== See also ==
- Accidents and incidents involving the Airbus A320 family
- Asiana Airlines Flight 214
- Air Canada Flight 624
