= Osoe-dong =

- Country: South Korea

Korean name
- Hangul: 오쇠동
- Hanja: 五釗洞
- RR: Osoe-dong
- MR: Osoe-dong

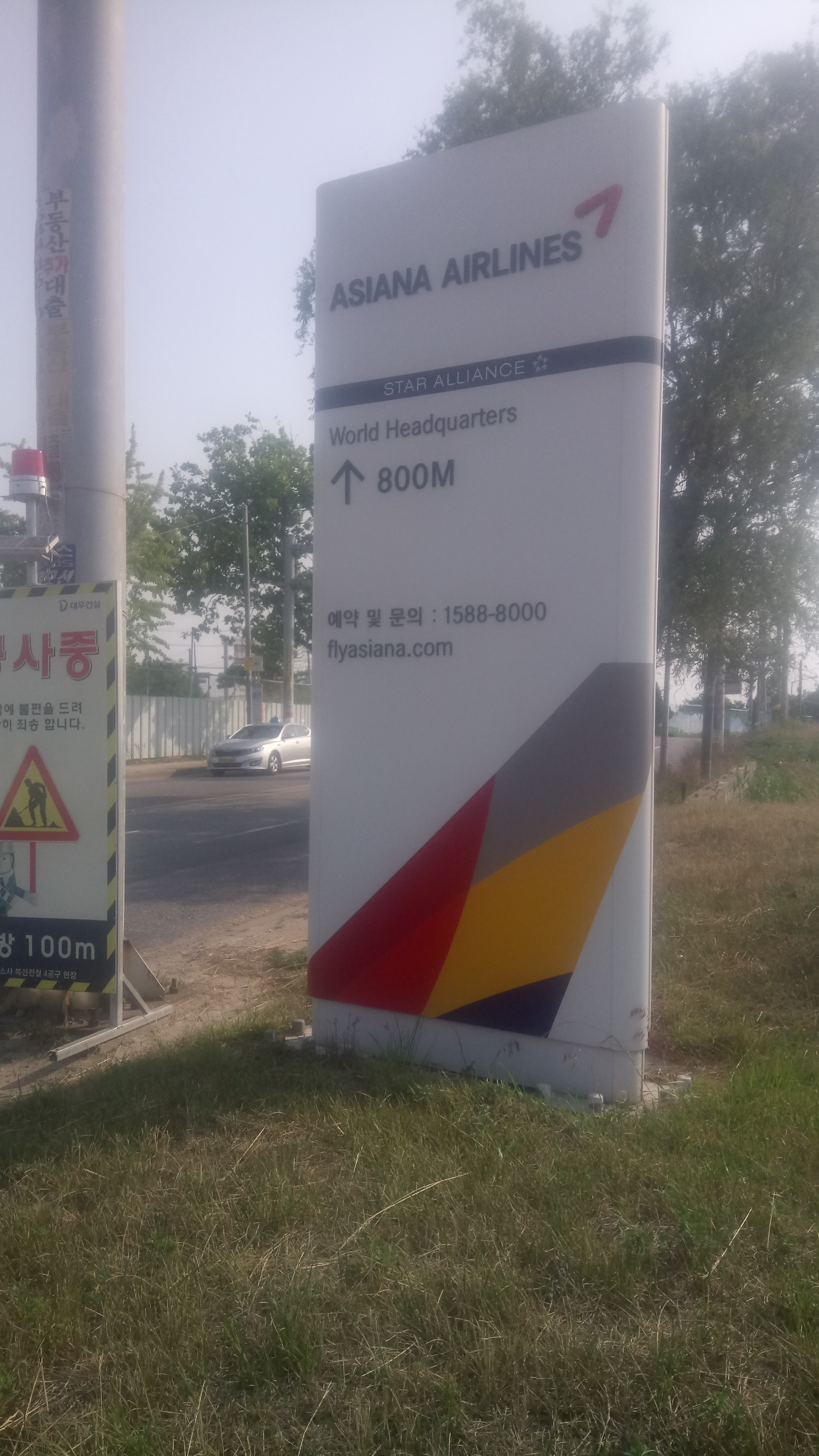
The sign for Asiana Town (아시아나타운), the Asiana Airlines headquarters

Osoe-dong (Korean: 오쇠동) is a dong (neighbourhood) of Gangseo District, Seoul, South Korea. It is a legal dong (법정동 法定洞) managed by its administrative dong (행정동 行政洞), Gonghang-dong.

Asiana Airlines maintains its headquarters, Asiana Town, in Osoe-dong.

== History ==
The name of the town originated from the fact that the region had five people who used to make iron crossbows in another place and took refuge.The region also had a sacred tree used for religious rituals.

From 1942, the Japanese constructed an airfield. After independence the airfield became the Gimpo airport.

In 1992, the original inhabitants of the town left with some compensations from the government to use the land for the airport

== See also ==
- Administrative divisions of South Korea
