= AirZeta =

Cargo airline of South Korea

AIRZETA 에어제타

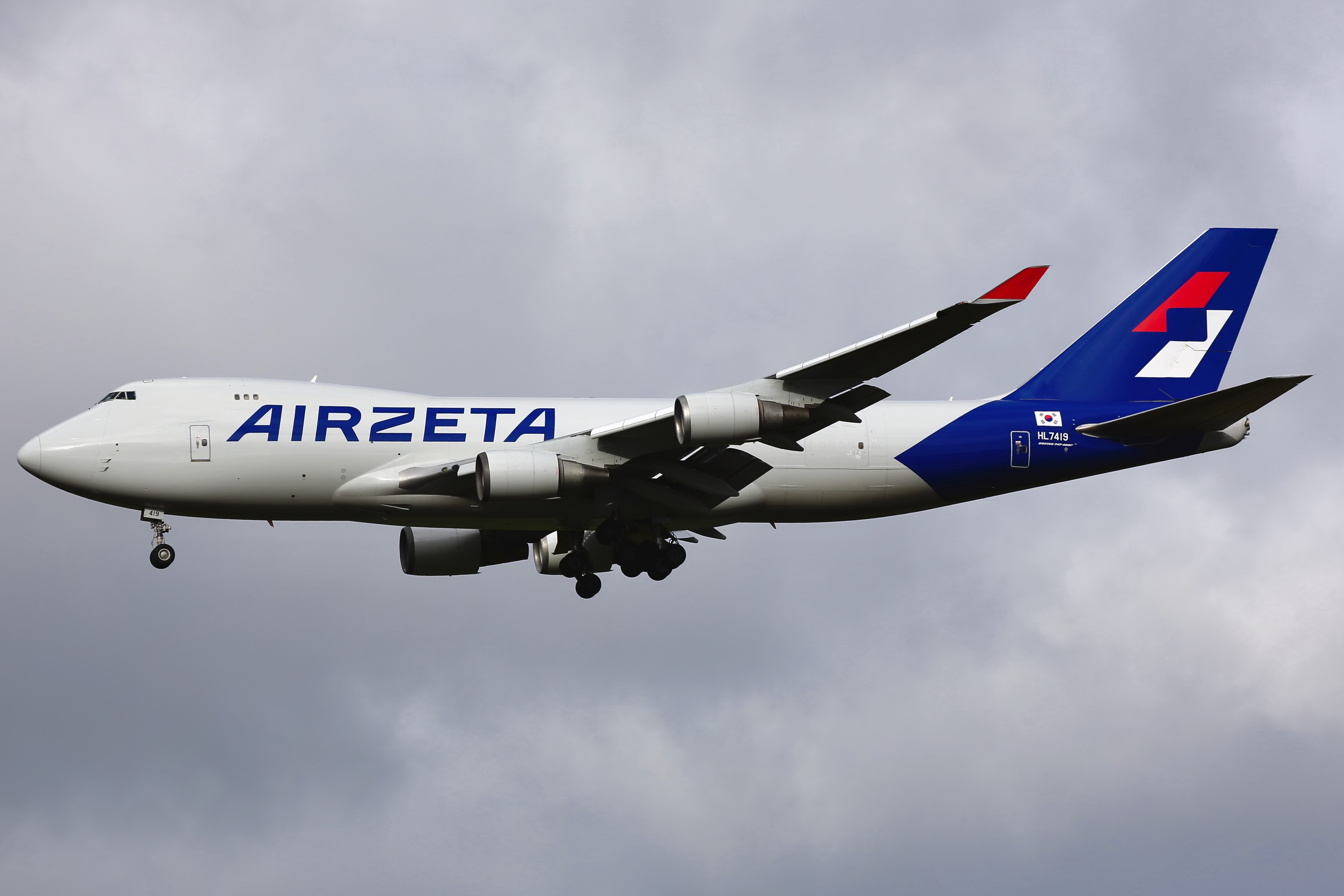
- AirZeta Boeing 747-400F
IATA	ICAO	Call sign
KJ	AIH	QUANTUM SKY
- Founded: 24 February 2012; 14 years ago (as Air Incheon)
- Commenced operations: 2 March 2013; 13 years ago
- Hubs: Incheon International Airport
- Fleet size: 15
- Destinations: 30
- Headquarters: Incheon, South Korea
- Key people: Seung-Hwan Lee (CEO)
- Website: www.airzetacargo.com

AirZeta, styled as AIRZETA, formerly known as Air Incheon, is a South Korean cargo airline with its hub at Incheon International Airport near Seoul.

== Development ==
On February 24, 2012, Air Incheon was founded and started its operations in March 2013.

In August 2016, Air Incheon signed a letter of intent for three Boeing 737-800 to be converted to freighters and leased from Spectre Air Capital. In May 2019, due to financial reasons, Air Incheon cancelled the order for the Boeing 737-800 Freighters as well as retiring its Boeing 767-300F and one Boeing 737-400F.

Following Korean Air and Asiana Airlines' merger in 2024, the cargo division of Asiana Airlines was sold to Air Incheon as part of the deal, which included several Boeing 747-400BDSF, Boeing 747-400F and Boeing 767-300F cargo aircraft.

On 1 August 2025, Air Incheon was rebranded as AIRZETA, officially taking over 11 aircraft: 10 Boeing 747-400 freighters, 1 Boeing 767-300 freighter and the network from Asiana Cargo following the transfer of the cargo department of Asiana Airlines. 800 employees from Asiana Cargo also joined AirZeta as part of the takeover, making AirZeta swelled the size of its workforce from around 200 to around 1,000 employees.

On 1 July 2026, AIRZETA changed its callsign to QUANTUM SKY.

== Destinations ==
As of August 2025, AIRZETA flies to the following destinations:

Country	City	Airport	Notes	Refs
Austria	Vienna	Vienna International Airport		
Bangladesh	Dhaka	Hazrat Shahjalal International Airport		
Belgium	Brussels	Brussels Airport		
China	Chengdu	Chengdu Shuangliu International Airport		
China	Chengdu	Chengdu Tianfu International Airport		
China	Chongqing	Chongqing Jiangbei International Airport		
China	Guangzhou	Guangzhou Baiyun International Airport		
China	Haikou	Haikou Meilan International Airport		
China	Qingdao	Qingdao Jiaodong International Airport		
China	Shanghai	Shanghai Pudong International Airport		
China	Tianjin	Tianjin Binhai International Airport		
China	Yantai	Yantai Penglai International Airport		
Germany	Frankfurt	Frankfurt Airport		
Hong Kong	Hong Kong	Hong Kong International Airport		
Italy	Milan	Milan Malpensa Airport		
Japan	Osaka	Kansai International Airport		
Japan	Sapporo	New Chitose Airport		
Japan	Tokyo	Narita International Airport		
Kazakhstan	Almaty	Almaty International Airport		
Singapore	Singapore	Changi Airport		
South Korea	Seoul	Incheon International Airport	Hub	
Thailand	Bangkok	Suvarnabhumi Airport		
United Kingdom	London	London Stansted Airport		
United States	Anchorage	Ted Stevens Anchorage International Airport		
United States	Atlanta	Hartsfield–Jackson Atlanta International Airport		
United States	Chicago	O'Hare International Airport		
United States	Dallas	Dallas Fort Worth International Airport		
United States	Los Angeles	Los Angeles International Airport		
United States	New York City	John F. Kennedy International Airport		
United States	San Francisco	San Francisco International Airport		
United States	Seattle	Seattle–Tacoma International Airport		
Vietnam	Hanoi	Noi Bai International Airport		

== Fleet ==
=== Current fleet ===
As of July 2026, AirZeta operates the following aircraft:

Aircraft	In fleet	Orders	Notes
Boeing 737-800SF	4	—	
Boeing 747-400BDSF	4	—	Transferred from Asiana Cargo.
Boeing 747-400F	6	—	Transferred from Asiana Cargo.
Boeing 767-300F	1	—	Transferred from Asiana Cargo.
Total	15	—	

=== Fleet development ===
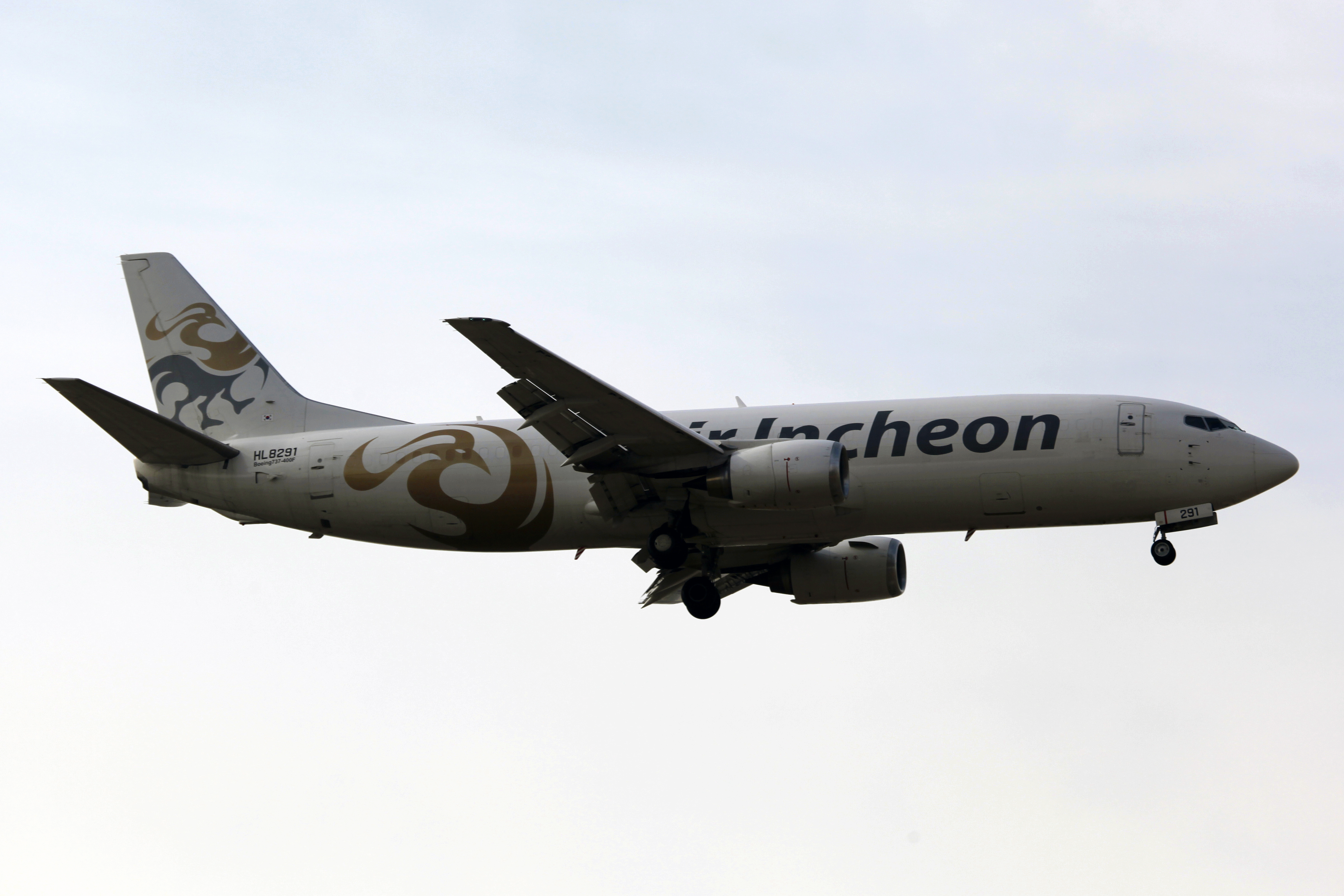
Air Incheon Boeing 737-400F, 2015

In August 2016, Air Incheon signed a letter of intent for three Boeing 737-800 to be converted to freighters and leased from Spectre Air Capital. In May 2019, due to financial reasons, Air Incheon cancelled the order for the Boeing 737-800NG Freighters as well as retiring its Boeing 767-300ERF and one Boeing 737-400F.

Following Korean Air and Asiana Airlines’ merger in 2024, the cargo division of Asiana Airlines, also known as Asiana Cargo, was sold to Air Incheon as part of the deal, which includes several Boeing 747-400BDSF, Boeing 747-400F and Boeing 767-300F cargo aircraft. AIRZETA officially took over the aircraft on 1 August, 2025.

=== Former fleet ===
As of August 2025, AirZeta operated 4 Boeing 737-800SF, 4 Boeing 747-400BDSF, 6 Boeing 737-400F and 1 Boeing 767-300F.

Air Incheon also operated the following aircraft (as of July 2021):

Aircraft	Total	Introduced	Retired
Boeing 737-400F	3	2013	2021
Boeing 767-300F	1	2018	2019
