= Mokpo Air Base =

Military airport in South Jeolla, South Korea

Mokpo Air Base 목포공항
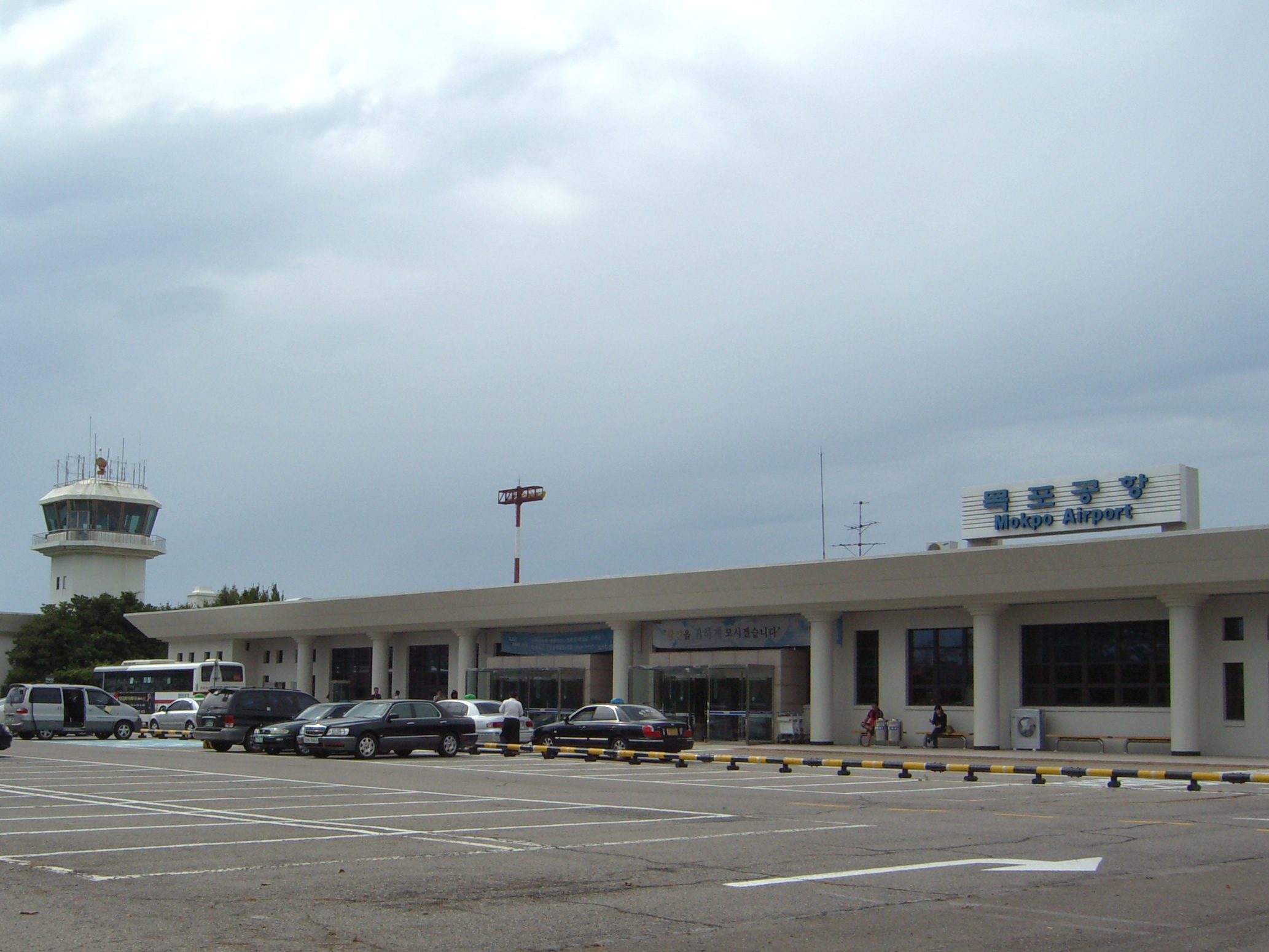
- IATA: ~~MPK~~; ICAO: RKJM

Summary
- Airport type: Military
- Owner/Operator: Republic of Korea Navy
- Location: Yeongam County, South Jeolla, South Korea
- Opened: 1969
- Passenger services ceased: 5 November 2007
- Elevation AMSL: 7 m / 23 ft
- Coordinates: 34°45′31″N 126°22′48″E
- Interactive map of Mokpo Air Base

Runways
Direction	Length		Surface
Direction	m	ft	Surface
06/24	1,600	5,249	Asphalt
- Source: DAFIF

Mokpo Air Base (Korean: 목포공항, IATA: ~~MPK~~, ICAO: RKJM) is an air base in Yeongam County, South Jeolla Province, South Korea, near Mokpo. In 2006, 16,909 passengers utilized the airport. The airport ceased commercial operations when the nearby Muan International Airport opened in November 2007.

== Overview ==
Mokpo Airport opened as a stopover between Seoul-Jeju in 1969 but closed in 1972. Twenty years later, Mokpo Airport opened again and several airplanes took off and landed. There were six daily flights to Seoul, two to Jeju, and one to Busan.

Problems associated with this airport include a narrow runway as well as frequent misty weather. Additionally, there were fewer customers after the crash of Asiana Airlines Flight 733 and the opening of the Seohaean Expressway also known as the west coast highway. These were among the reasons that the airport was closed in 2007.

== Accidents and incidents ==
On 26 July 1993, Asiana Airlines Flight 733, a Boeing 737-500 (HL7229) struck high ground in poor weather about four kilometres from the runway in Mokpo while it was making its third attempt at landing. 2 of the 6 crew members and 66 of the 110 passengers were killed.
