= Hiroshima Airport =

Airport in Mihara, Hiroshima Prefecture, Japan

Hiroshima Airport 広島空港
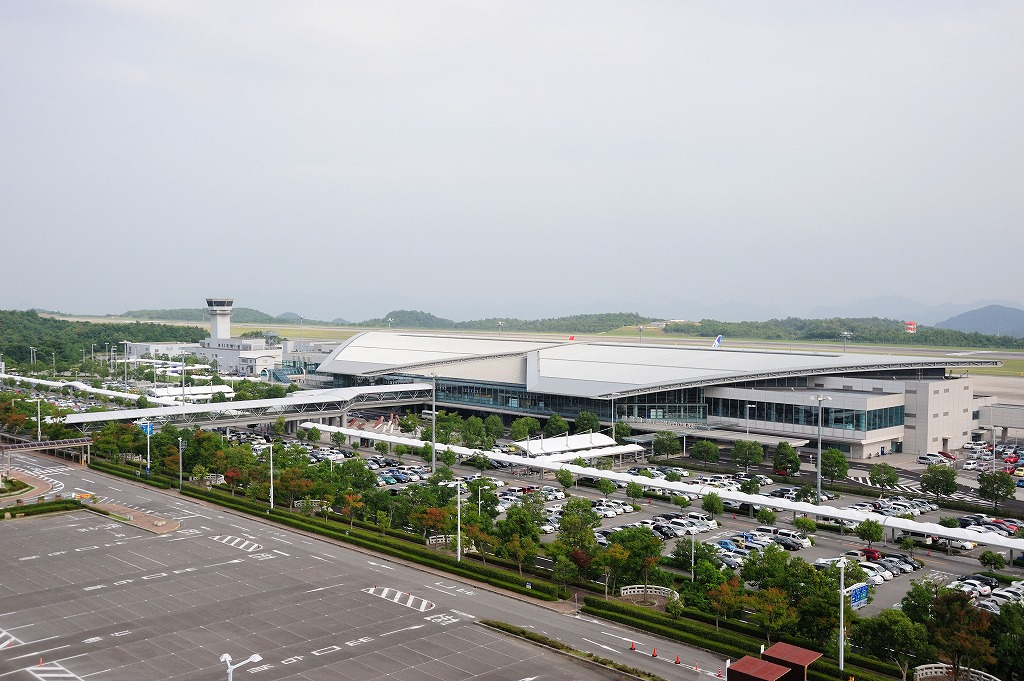
- IATA: HIJ; ICAO: RJOA; WMO: 47789

Summary
- Airport type: Public
- Operator: Hiroshima International Airport Co., Ltd (広島国際空港株式会社)
- Serves: Hiroshima Prefecture
- Location: Mihara, Hiroshima Prefecture, Japan
- Opened: 29 October 1993; 32 years ago
- Elevation AMSL: 1,086 ft (331 m)
- Coordinates: 34°26′10″N 132°55′10″E
- Website: www.hij.airport.jp

Map
- Location in Hiroshima Prefecture Location in Japan

Runways
Direction	Length		Surface
Direction	m	ft	Surface
10/28	3,000	9,843	Asphalt concrete

Statistics (2015)
- Passengers: 2,669,210
- Cargo (metric tonnes): 18,704
- Aircraft movement: 23,294
- Source: Japanese Ministry of Land, Infrastructure, Transport and Tourism

Hiroshima Airport (広島空港, Hiroshima Kūkō) (IATA: HIJ, ICAO: RJOA) is an international airport in the city of Mihara, Hiroshima Prefecture, Japan. Located 50 km (31 mi) east of Hiroshima, it is the largest airport in the Chugoku and Shikoku region, and the second busiest in the region after Matsuyama Airport. 80% of the airport's domestic traffic is to and from Haneda Airport in Tokyo. In 2022, the Hiroshima-Haneda route was the tenth-busiest domestic air route in Japan.

== History ==
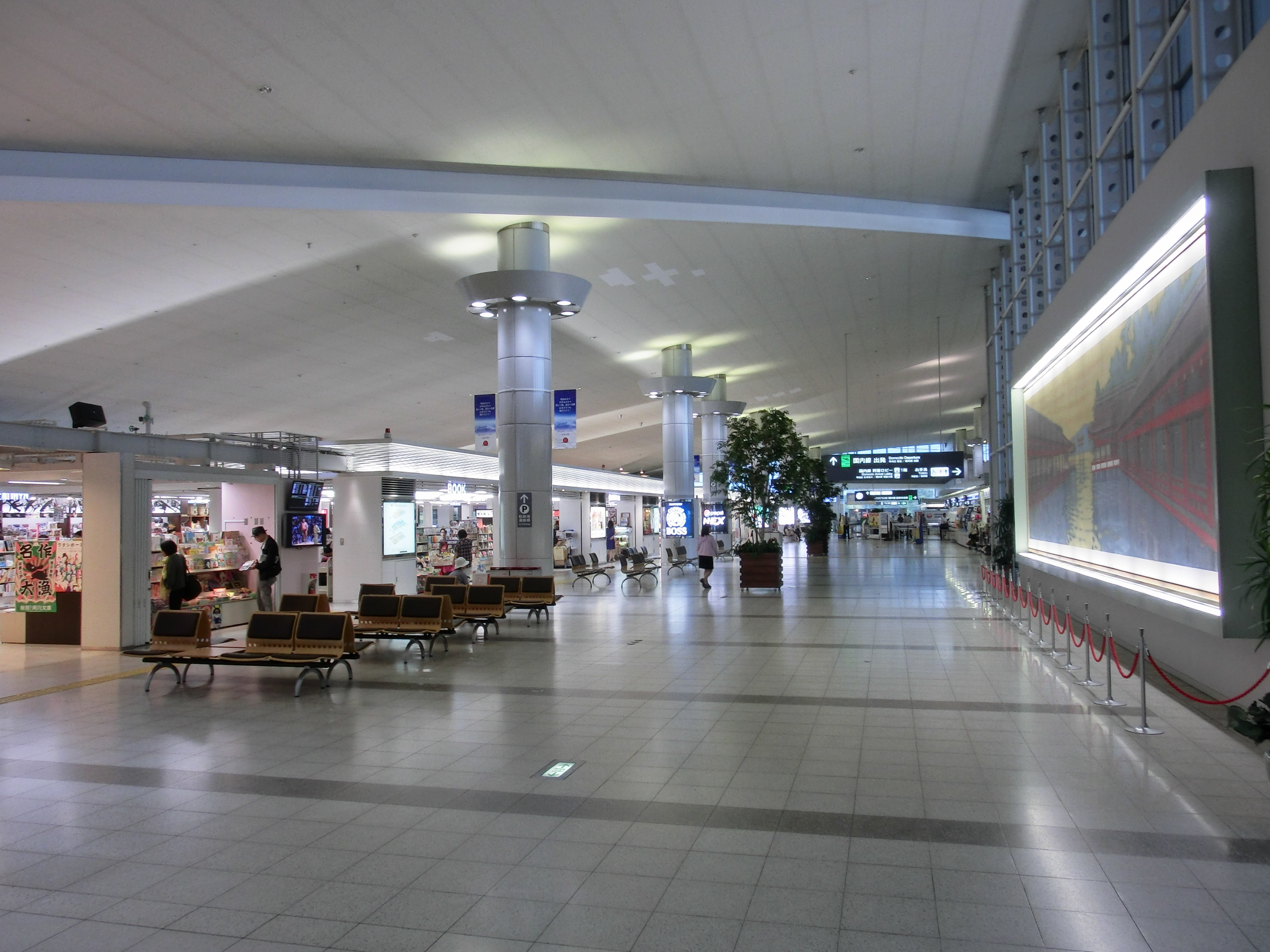
Hiroshima Airport interior

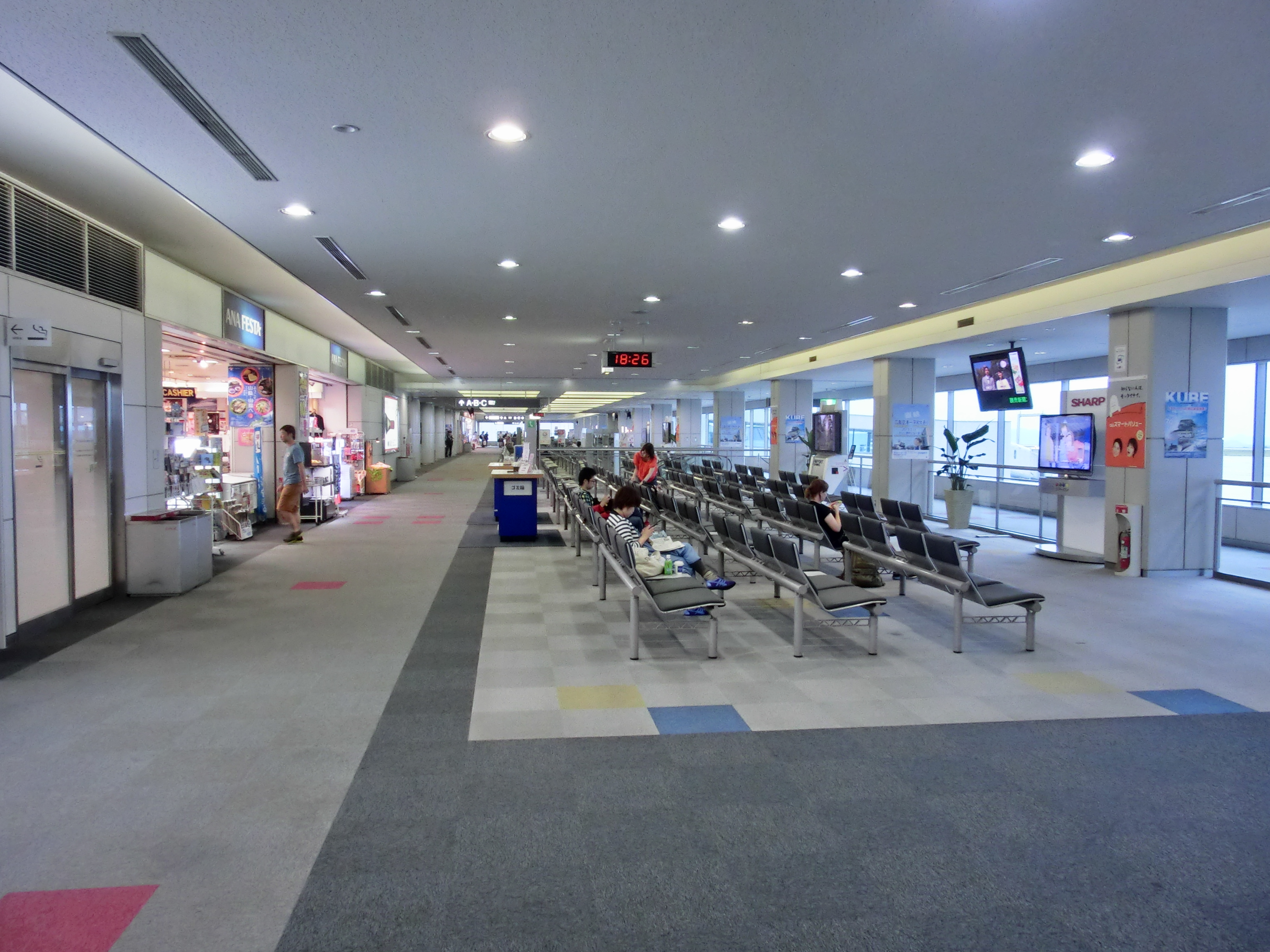
Hiroshima Airport (airside)

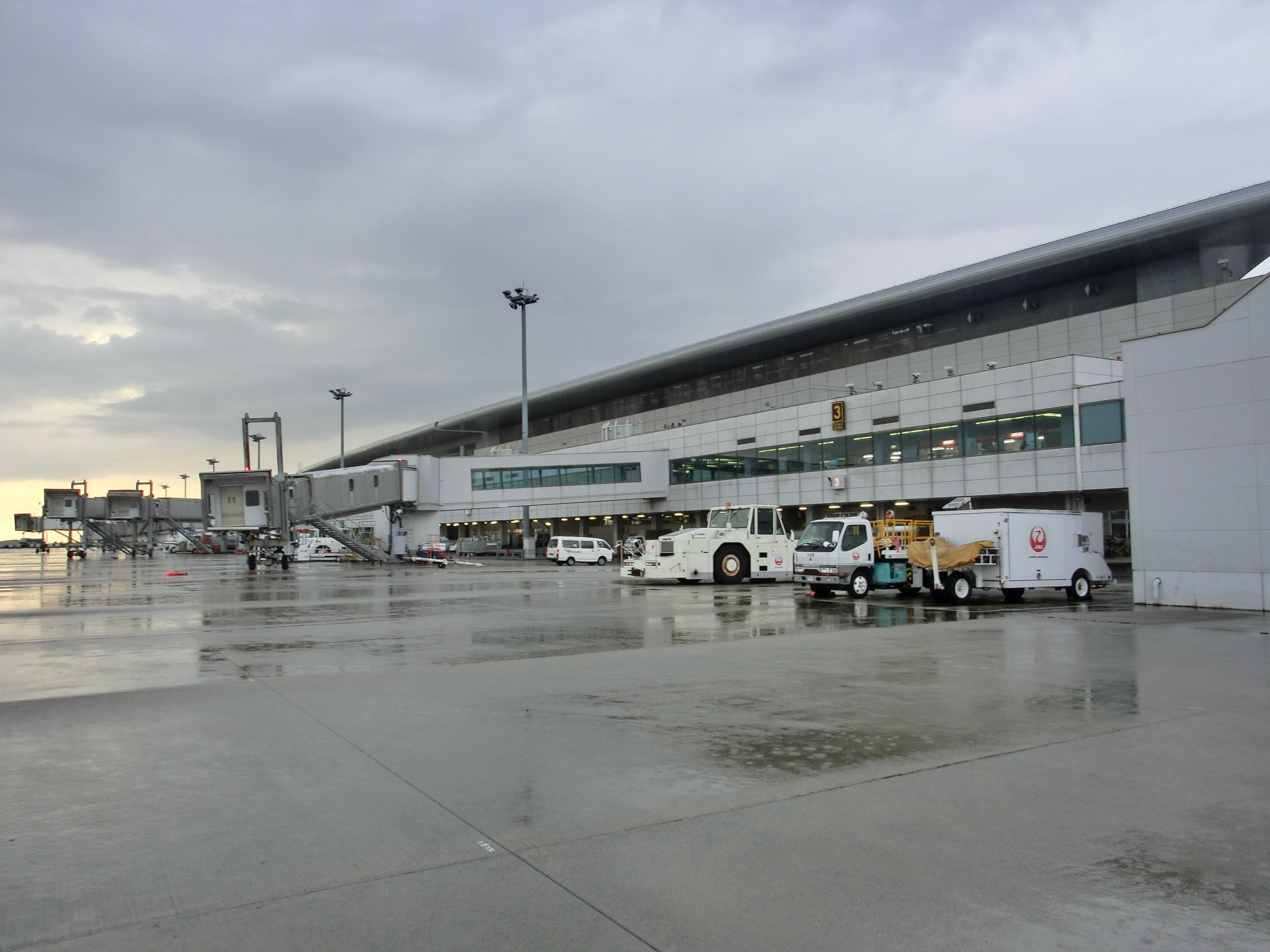
Terminal building

The New Hiroshima Airport was opened for public use on 29 October 1993 as a replacement for the old Hiroshima Airport, which was renamed Hiroshima-Nishi Airport. The old airport was located in a more central waterfront location, but was too small to handle widebody aircraft and could not be expanded. In 1994, the New Hiroshima Airport was renamed to just Hiroshima Airport after the old airport was renamed.

The airport's single runway opened with a length of 2,500 m (700 m longer than Hiroshima-Nishi). The runway was then extended to 3,000 m in 2001, and its ILS was upgraded to CAT-IIIa in 2008 and CAT-IIIb in 2009.

== Terminal ==
The airport only has one terminal with separated departures and arrivals facilities for domestic and international flights and nine gates (A1/A2 through D domestic; E through H international). The international and domestic areas are separated landside by a central atrium. The domestic departures lounge has separate JAL and ANA airline lounges, while the international area has one shared airport lounge.

== Airlines and destinations ==
Airlines	Destinations
Aero K	Cheongju
All Nippon Airways	Naha, Sapporo–Chitose, Tokyo–Haneda
China Airlines	Taipei–Taoyuan
China Eastern Airlines	Shanghai–Pudong
HK Express	Hong Kong
Ibex Airlines	Sendai
J-Air	Sapporo–Chitose
Japan Airlines	Tokyo–Haneda
Jeju Air	Seoul–Incheon
Korean Air	Seoul–Incheon (begins 23 December 2026)
Spring Japan	Tokyo–Narita
VietJet Air	Hanoi

== Statistics ==
Year	Passengers	Year	Passengers
1995	2,652,270	1998	2,989,733
1996	2,761,389	1999	3,263,171
1997	2,849,670	2000	3,330,770
2011	2,499,855	2012	2,693,652
2013	2,622,309	2014	2,677,134

== Ground transportation ==
=== Road ===
The airport has no direct expressway connection but is located near the San'yō Expressway. Limousine bus service to and from the downtown Hiroshima Bus Terminal is scheduled at 53 minutes but is often subject to traffic delays. Hiroshima Station is accessible by bus in 45 minutes. Bus service is also available to Shiraichi Station, Fukuyama Station, Kure Station and Mihara Station.

=== Rail ===
Unusually among major Japanese airports, Hiroshima Airport has no railway station. The closest station is Shiraichi Station on the San'yō Main Line, and planners have proposed connecting the airport to this station with a new line, or to build a new station on the San'yō Shinkansen high-speed rail line. The West Japan Railway Company (JR), which operates both lines, has rejected proposals for connections because of the high cost involved and to maintain JR's competitiveness with commercial airlines for passenger traffic to and from Hiroshima.

== Accidents and incidents ==
Landing path of Flight 162 at Hiroshima

- On 14 April 2015, Asiana Airlines Flight 162, operated by Airbus A320 HL-7762 departed the runway on landing. The aircraft was operating an international scheduled passenger flight from Incheon International Airport, Seoul, South Korea. At least 27 of the 81 people on board were injured (25 passengers and two crew members). Initial indications were that the aircraft had hit off the localizer antenna belonging to the airport's Instrument landing system as it was coming in to land. The airport was closed through 16 April and reopened on 17 April with the ILS offline, resulting in flight cancellations during periods of adverse weather.
