= Geumjusan =

Mountain in Gyeonggi, South Korea

Highest point
- Elevation: 569.2 m (1,867 ft)
- Coordinates: 37°57′N 127°16′E

Geography
- Location: South Korea

Korean name
- Hangul: 금주산
- Hanja: 金珠山
- RR: Geumjusan
- MR: Kŭmjusan

Geumjusan (Korean: 금주산) is a mountain in Gyeonggi Province, South Korea. Its area extends across Pocheon. Geumjusan has an elevation of 569.2 m (1,867 ft).

== See also ==
- List of mountains in Korea
