= Streptomyces panacagri =

Scientific classification
- Domain: Bacteria
- Kingdom: Bacillati
- Phylum: Actinomycetota
- Class: Actinomycetia
- Order: Streptomycetales
- Family: Streptomycetaceae
- Genus: Streptomyces
- Species: S. panacagri

Binomial name
- Streptomyces panacagri Cui et al. 2012

Type strain
- DSM 41871, Gsoil 519, KCTC 19139

Species of bacterium

Streptomyces panacagri is a Gram-positive, spore-forming and aerobic bacterium species from the genus of Streptomyces which has been isolated from soil from a ginseng field in the Pocheon in South Korea.

== See also ==
- List of Streptomyces species
