= Buhwal =

Buhwal (Korean: 부활) may refer to:

- Buhwal-ho, a South Korean powered aircraft, developed in 1953
- Boohwal, a South Korean rock band, formed in 1985
- Resurrection (Buhwal) is a 2005 South Korean television series
