= Republic of Korea Air Force =

Air warfare branch of South Korea's military

- 대한민국 공군
- Republic of Korea Air Force emblem
- Founded: 1 October 1949 (77 years, 1 month)
- Country: South Korea
- Type: Air force Space force
- Role: Aerial warfare Space warfare
- Size: 65,000 (2022); 720 aircraft
- Part of: Republic of Korea Armed Forces
- Headquarters: Gyeryong, South Korea
- Mottos: 대한민국을 지키는 가장 높은 힘; "The Highest Power Defending the Republic of Korea"
- March: 공군가; "Air Force Anthem"
- Mascots: "Haneuli" and "Purumae"
- Equipment: KF-21(In development)
- Engagements: Korean War; Persian Gulf War; Global War on Terrorism
- Website: airforce.mil.kr

Commanders
- President: Lee Jae-Myung
- Minister of National Defense: Ahn Gyu-back
- Chief of Staff of Air Force: General Son Sug Rag
- Vice Chief of Staff of Air Force: Lieutenant General

Insignia
- Flag

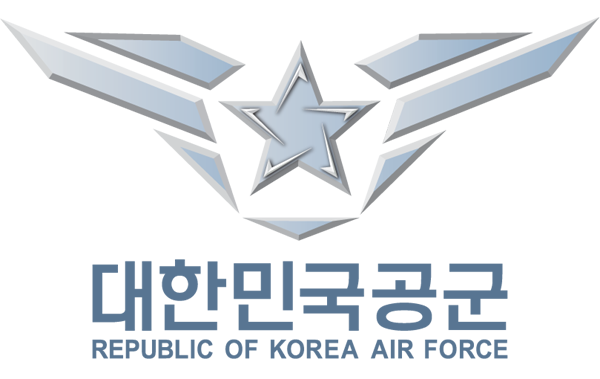
- Logo

- Roundel

- Low Visibility Roundel

Aircraft flown
- Electronic warfare: E-7A
- Fighter: KF-5E/F, F-16C, F-15K, FA-50, F-35A
- Helicopter: Bell 412, CH-47D, HH-60P, S-92, Ka-32, MD 500 Defender, Eurocopter AS332
- Attack helicopter: MD 500 Defender
- Patrol: RQ-4 Global Hawk
- Reconnaissance: RC-800, Dassault Falcon 2000
- Trainer: KAI KT-1, TA-50/50B, KT-100
- Transport: Boeing 747, Boeing 737, CASA CN-235, C-130H, C-130J
- Tanker: A330 MRTT

Korean name
- Hangul: 대한민국 공군
- Hanja: 大韓民國空軍
- RR: Daehanminguk gonggun
- MR: Taehanmin'guk konggun

The Republic of Korea Air Force (ROKAF; Korean: 대한민국 공군), also known as the ROK Air Force or South Korean Air Force, is the aerial and space warfare service branch of South Korea, operating under the South Korean Ministry of National Defense.

== History ==
=== 1940s ===
Shortly after the end of World War II, the South Korean Air Construction Association was founded on 10 August 1946, to publicize the importance of air power. Despite the then-scanty status of Korean armed forces, the first air unit was formed on 5 May 1948, under the direction of Dong Wi-bu, the forerunner to the modern South Korean Ministry of National Defense. On 13 September 1949, the United States contributed 10 L-4 Grasshopper observation aircraft to the South Korean air unit. An Army Air Academy was founded in January 1949, and the ROKAF was officially founded in October 1949.

=== 1950s ===
The 1950s were a critical time for the ROKAF as it expanded tremendously during the Korean War. At the outbreak of the war, the ROKAF consisted of 1,800 personnel but was equipped with only 20 trainers and liaison aircraft, including 10 North American T-6 Texan advanced trainers purchased from Canada. The North Korean Air Force had acquired a considerable number of Yak-9 and La-7 fighters from the Soviet Union, dwarfing the ROKAF in terms of size and strength. During the war, though, the ROKAF acquired 110 aircraft - 79 fighter-bombers, three fighter squadrons, and one fighter wing. The first combat aircraft received was North American F-51D Mustangs, along with a contingent of US Air Force instructor pilots under the command of Major Dean Hess, as part of Bout One Project. The ROKAF participated in bombing operations and flew independent sorties. After the war, the ROKAF Headquarters were moved to Daebangdong, Seoul. Air Force University was also founded in 1956. In 1953, ROKAF Technical School developed a liaison aircraft named Buhwal-ho, which is the first domestic-developed powered aircraft of Korea.

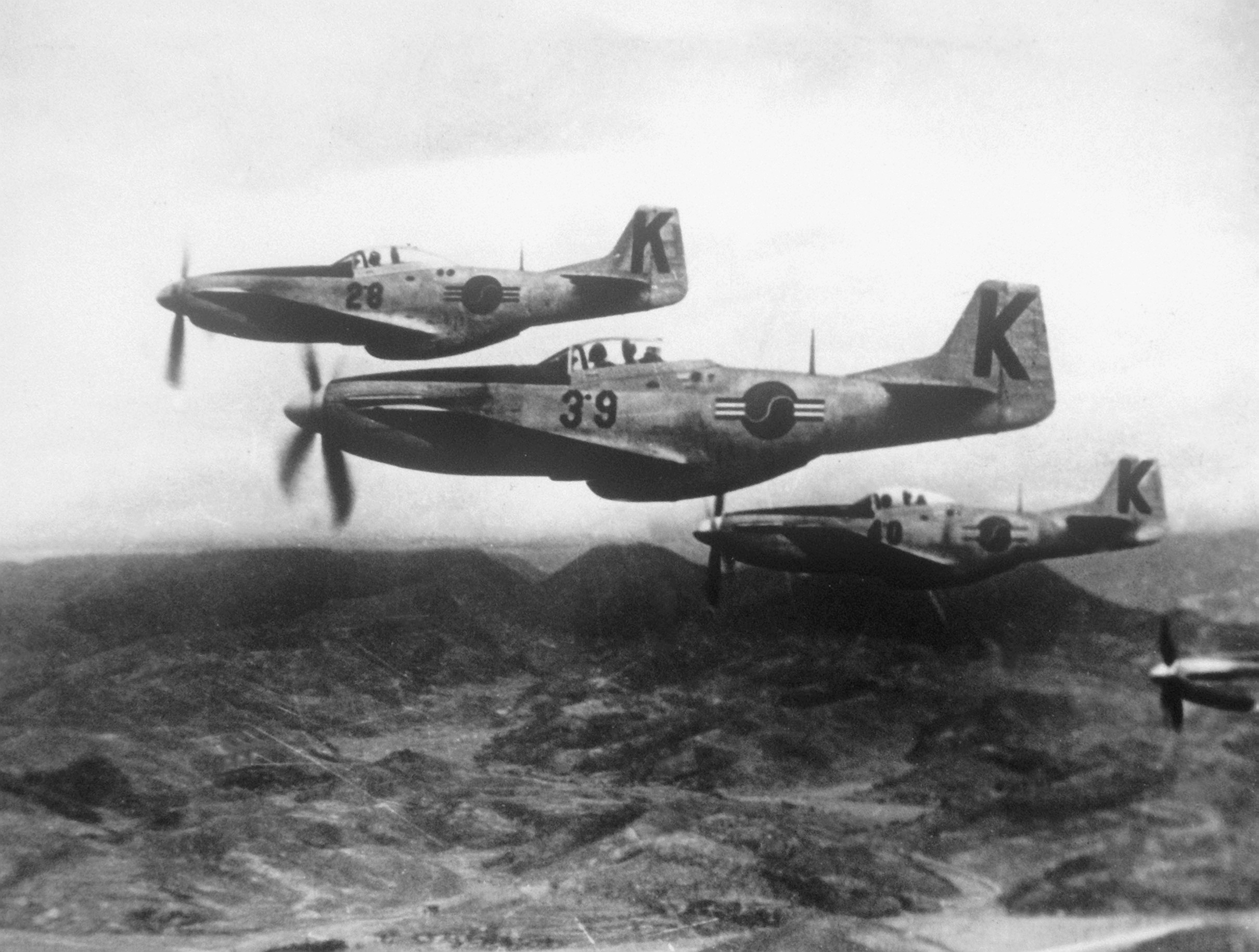
P-51 Mustangs were among the first fighter aircraft for the ROKAF

=== 1960s ===
To counter the threat of possible North Korean aggression, the ROKAF underwent a substantial capability enhancement. The ROKAF acquired North American T-28 Trojan trainers, North American F-86D Sabre night- and all-weather interceptors, Northrop F-5 fighters and McDonnell Douglas F-4D Phantom fighter bombers. Air Force Operations Command was established in 1961 to secure efficient command and control facilities. Air Force Logistics Command was established in 1966, and emergency runways were constructed for emergency use during wartime. The Eunma Unit was founded in 1966 to operate Curtiss C-46 Commando transport aircraft used to support Republic of Korea Army and Republic of Korea Marine Corps units serving in South Vietnam during the Vietnam War.

=== 1970s ===
The ROKAF was posed with a security risk, with an increasingly belligerent North Korea throughout the 1970s. The South Korean government increased its expenditure on the ROKAF, resulting in the purchase of Northrop F-5E Tiger II fighters in August 1974 and F-4E fighter-bombers. Support aircraft, such as Fairchild C-123 Providers and Grumman S-2 Trackers were also purchased at the time. Great emphasis was placed on the flight training program; new trainer aircraft (Cessna T-41 Mescalero and Cessna T-37) were purchased, and the Air Force Education & Training Command was also founded in 1973 to consolidate and enhance the quality of personnel training.

=== 1980s ===
The ROKAF concentrated on the qualitative expansion of aircraft to catch up to the strength of the North Korean Air Force. In 1982, Korean variants of the F-5E, the Jegong-ho were first produced. The ROKAF gathered a good deal of information on the North Korean Air Force when Captain Lee Woong-Pyeong, a North Korean pilot, defected to South Korea. The Korean Combat Operations Information Center was soon formed and the Air Defence System was automated to attain air superiority against North Korea. When the 1988 Seoul Olympics was held in South Korea, the ROKAF contributed to the success of this event by helping to oversee the entire security system. The ROKAF also moved its headquarters and the Air Force Education & Training Command to other locations. 40 General Dynamics F-16 Fighting Falcon fighters were also purchased in 1989.

=== 1990s ===
South Korea committed its support for coalition forces during the Persian Gulf War, forming the "Bima Unit" to fight in the war. The ROKAF also provided airlift support for peacekeeping operations in Somalia in 1993. The increased participation in international operations depicted the ROKAF's elevated international position. Over 180 KF-16 fighters of F-16 Block 52 specifications were introduced as part of the Peace Bridge II & III program in 1994. In 1997, for the first time in Korean aviation history, female cadets were accepted into the Korean Air Force Academy.

=== 2000s ===
The last of the old South Korean 60 F-5A/B fighters were all retired in August 2007, and they were replaced with the F-15K and F/A-50. On 20 October 2009, Bruce S. Lemkin, deputy undersecretary of the U.S. Air Force, said that the ROKAF's limited intelligence, surveillance and reconnaissance (ISR) capabilities increased the risk of instability on the Korean Peninsula and suggested the purchase of American systems such as the F-35 Lightning II to close this gap.

=== 2010s ===
The South Korean Air Force also expressed interest in acquiring the RQ-4 Global Hawk remotely piloted vehicle (RPV) and several Joint Direct Attack Munition conversion kits to further improve its intelligence and offensive capabilities. In 2014, Northrop Grumman awarded a contract to provide South Korea with four RQ-4 Global. The South Korean Air Force acquired 40 F-35s and +20 additional F-35.

=== 2020s ===
In 2021, the Space Operations Center was established at the Air Force Headquarters.

On 22 October 2023, the ROKAF conducted its first-ever trilateral exercise with the United States and Japanese air forces near the Korean Peninsula.

On 7 June 2024, F-4E Phantom II, which were deployed at the 10th Fighter Wing based in Suwon, were retired.

On 6 March 2025, a KF-16 accidentally released eight bombs over Pocheon, Gyeonggi Province, injuring 43 people and damaging buildings and vehicles.

== Organization ==
=== Republic of Korea Air Force Headquarters ===
- Republic of Korea Air Force Headquarters
  - 7th Air Force Communication Service Group, based at Pyeongtaek
  - 35th Flight Group, based at Seongnam
  - Air Force Test & Evaluation Wing, based at Sacheon (KF-21)
    - 281st Flight Test Squadron
  - 53rd Air Demonstration Group, based at Wonju
  - 91st Civil Engineer Group
  - Air Force Aerospace Medical Center
  - Air Force Weather Group
  - Air Force Operations Command
    - Korean Air And Space Operations Center
    - Air Combat Command
      - 1st Fighter Wing, based at Gwangju (T-50)
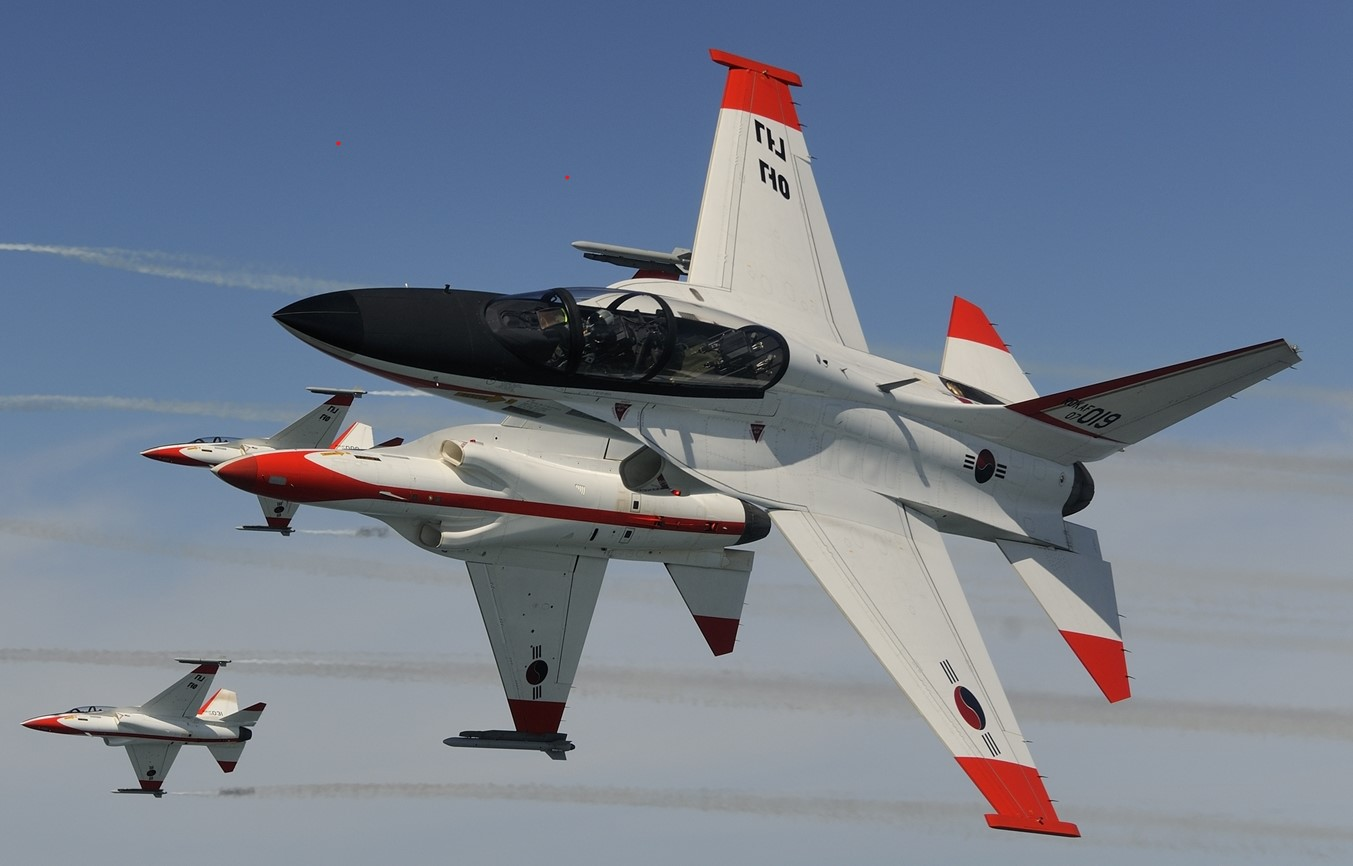
        T-50 Squadron on demo flight
      - 8th Fighter Wing, based at Wonju (FA-50, KA-1, HARPY)
      - 10th Fighter Wing, based at Suwon (KF-5E/F)
      - 11th Fighter Wing, based at Daegu (F-15K)
      - 16th Fighter Wing, based at Yecheon (TA-50, FA-50)
        - 156th Fighter Squadron (KF-21)
      - 17th Fighter Wing, based at Cheongju (F-35A)
      - 18th Fighter Wing, based at Gangneung (KF-5E/F)
      - 19th Fighter Wing, based at Jungwon (KF-16, F-16)
      - 20th Fighter Wing, based at Seosan (KF-16)
      - 29th Tactical Fighter Weapons Group, based at Cheongju
      - 38th Fighter Group, based at Kunsan (KF-16)
    - Air Mobility & Reconnaissance Command
      - 3rd Flight Training Wing, based at Sacheon (KT-1)
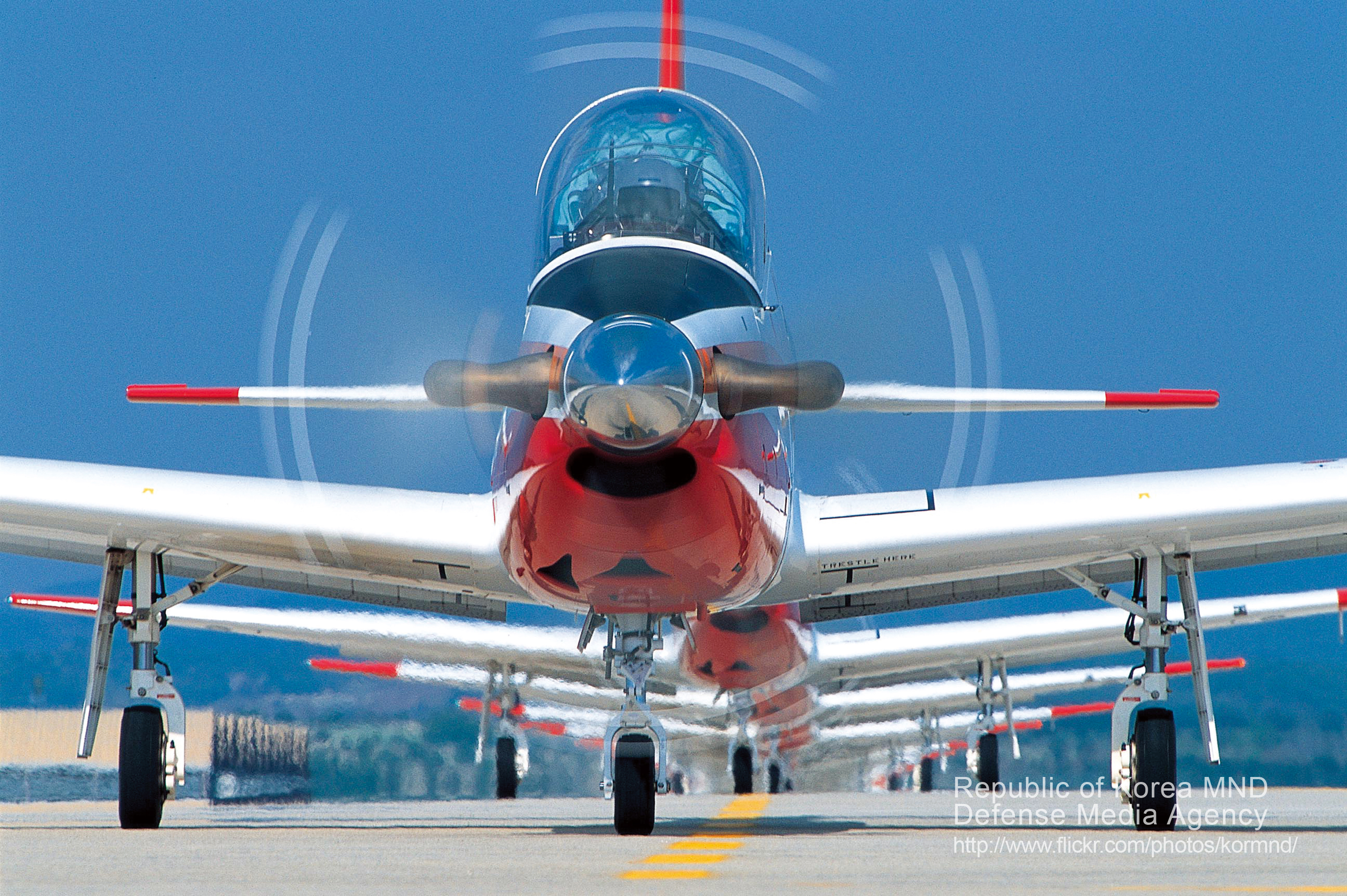
        KT-1 Woongbi Basic Trainer preparing to take off
        - 213th Flight Training Squadron
        - 215th Flight Training Squadron
        - 217th Flight Training Squadron
        - 236th Flight Training Squadron
      - 5th Air Mobility Wing, based at Gimhae (C-130, CN-235, KC-330)
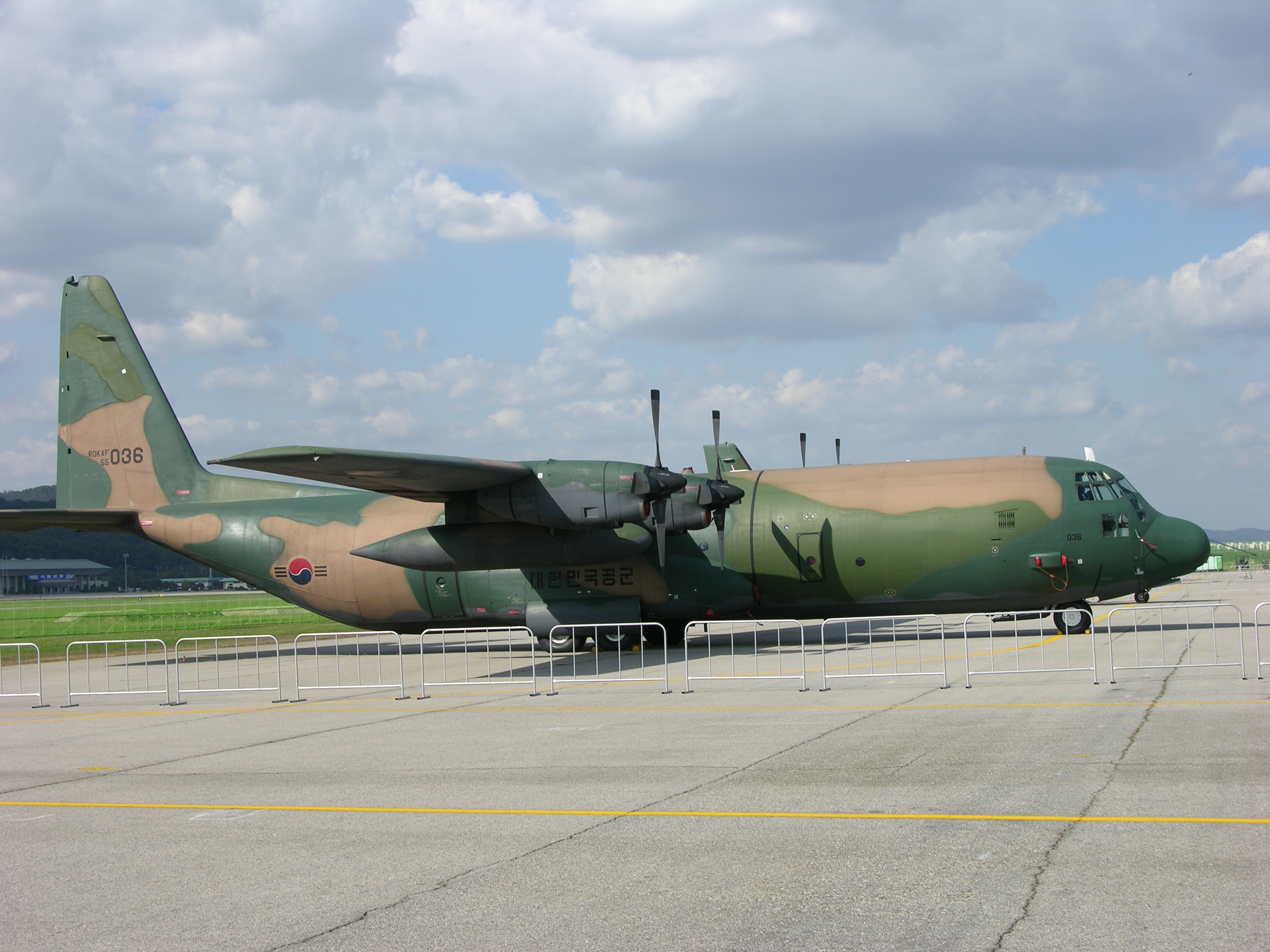
        A Lockheed C-130 Hercules transport aircraft
      - 15th Special Missions Wing, based at Seongnam (C-130, CN-235)
      - 39th Reconnaissance Wing, based at Jungwon (RF-16, RC-800)
      - 6th Search & Rescue Air Group, based at Cheongju
        - 231st Search and Rescue Squadron
        - 233rd Search and Rescue Squadron
        - 235th Search and Rescue Squadron
        - Special search and Rescue squad
      - 28th Flight Group
      - 51st Air Control Flight Group, based at Gimhae (E-737)
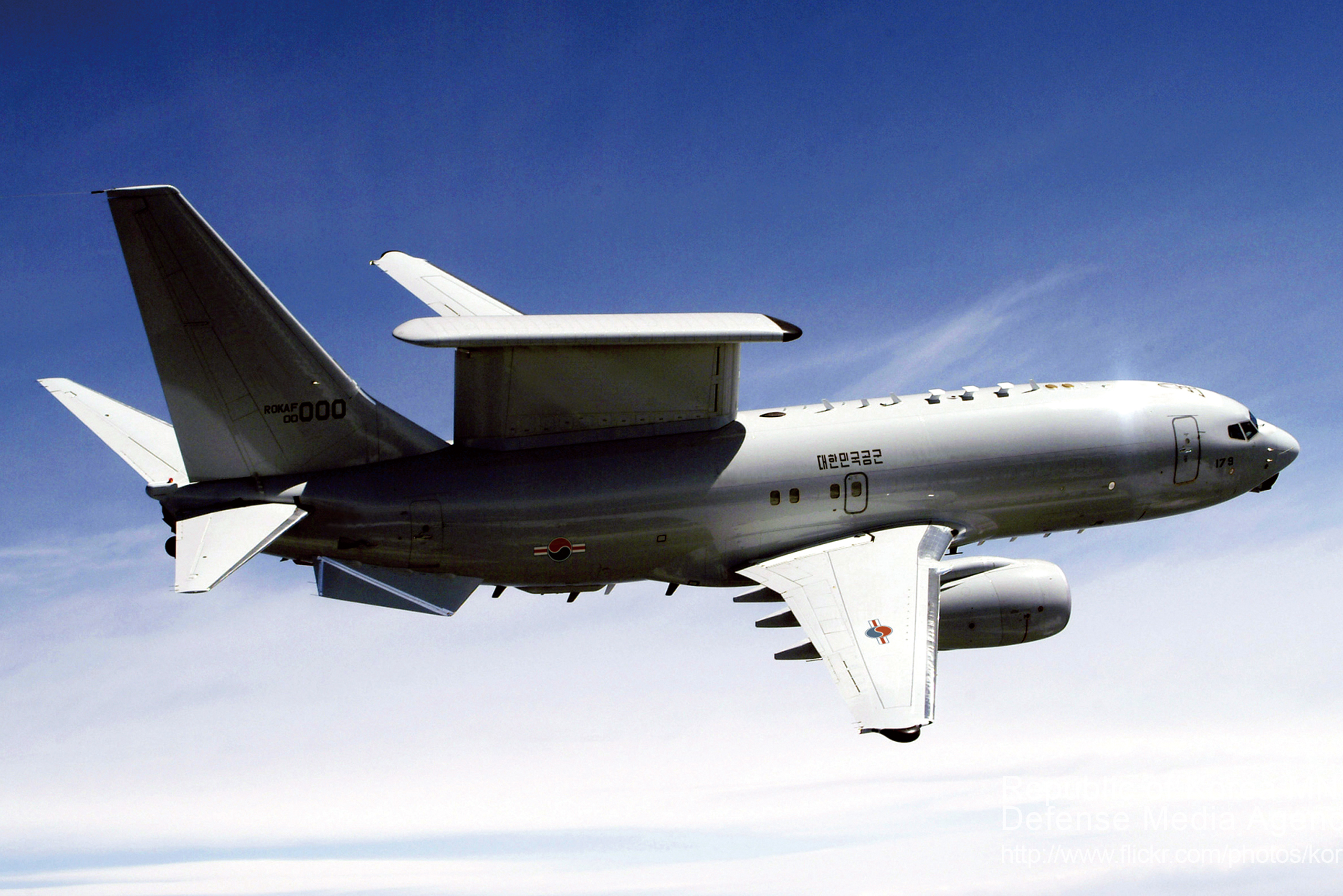
        Boeing 737 AEW&C aircraft of the Republic of Korea Air Force
    - Air & Missile Defense Command
      - 1st Air & Missile Defense Brigade
      - 2nd Air & Missile Defense Brigade
      - 3rd Air & Missile Defense Brigade
    - Air Defense Control Command
      - 31st Air Defense Control Group (1MCRC)
      - 32nd Air Defense Control Group (2MCRC)
      - 33rd Air Defense Control Group
      - 34th Air Defense Control Group
  - Air Force Logistics Command
  - Air Force Education & Training Command
    - Air Force Basic Military Training Wing, based at Sacheon
    - Air Force Aviation Science High School
    - Air Force 1st Logistics School
    - Air Force 2nd Logistics School
    - Information Communication School
    - Administrative School
    - Air Defence Artillery School
    - Boramae Leadership Center
  - Air Force Academy

== Current major projects ==
=== KF-X future fighter program ===
The Korea Aerospace Industries (KAI) KF-21 Boramae (Northern Goshawk) is a multi-role 4.5 generation fighter built By Korean KAI and Indonesian PT DI. It will have capabilities in between the light FA-50 fighter and the high-grade, long-range, heavy payload F-15K and F-35 Lightning II.

=== Mid-altitude unmanned aerial vehicles (MUAV) ===
The indigenously developed KUS-FS, nicknamed MUAV or Korean Unmanned System (KUS-FS), is designed for armed land and sea Intelligence, Surveillance and Reconnaissance (ISR) missions with endurance of up to 24 hours. Its maiden flight was in 2012. Korean Air's Aerospace Division (KAL-ASD) unveiled its MALE UAV in 2019 with LIG Nex1 SAR and Hanwha EO/IR sensors, aimed for serial production in 2021. It reportedly has a wider wingspan than the Reaper at 25 m and is powered by a 1200 hp Pratt & Whitney PT6 turboprop engine. South Korea will develop turbofan engines to be installed in high-performance unmanned aerial vehicles by 2025.

=== M-SAM Block II ===
In the spring of 2017 the PIP missile (M-SAM Block II) began its final tests, during which it shot down five of five practice ballistic missile targets. Seven (batteries) are scheduled for deployment throughout South Korea by 2022.

=== L-SAM ===
L-SAM refers to a locally made long-range surface-to-air missile currently under development, while the Cheolmae II, also known as KM-SAM, is a domestically manufactured medium-range surface-to-air missile capable of engaging an incoming target at an altitude as high as 20 kilometers. The new project has been nicknamed the K-THAAD due to its planned long range of 25 to 93 miles and its ability to hit targets as high as 200,000 feet. Nearly $1 billion has been devoted to the L-SAM or Cheolmae-4, which is scheduled for completion in 2022 with deployment of four batteries to follow a year or two afterwards.

=== Large Strategic Transport Aircraft ===
Since the introduction of the C-130J-30 Super Hercules as a large transport aircraft in 2010, ROKAF has announced its intention to implement a second project for the acquisition of large strategic transporters. Defense Acquisition Program Administration (DAPA) has disclosed detailed plans, outlining the purchase of four aircraft from overseas, with the entire project costing 480 billion won (US$37 million). DAPA has also mandated the formation of a consortium, involving Korean companies in the production of aircraft components.

Throughout March and April 2023, ROKAF, DAPA, and KIDA (the Korea Institute for Defense Analysis) conducted an assessment of manufacturers, including Airbus, Embraer, Lockheed Martin, as part of the procurement evaluation. The three manufacturers submitted the Airbus A400M Atlas, Embraer C-390 Millennium, and Lockheed Martin C-130J Super Hercules for consideration in the second project. In December 2023, DAPA selected the Embraer C-390 Millennium as the winner of the Large Transport Aircraft (LTA) II tender, and planning to introduce three units by 2026.

In 2018, apart from the second project, the Korean government was in discussions with the Spanish government regarding a potential swap involving the Airbus A400M Atlas for the KT-1 Woongbi basic trainer and the T-50 Golden Eagle advanced trainer.

=== Long Range Air Defense Radar ===
South Korea's Defense Acquisition Program Administration (DAPA) has launched a project to develop an indigenous long-range air defense radar. Foreign-manufactured radars (Lockheed Martin TPS-77) currently in use to monitor Kadiz will be phased out and replaced with new domestic equipment starting in 2027, according to the agency.

== Equipment ==
=== Aircraft ===
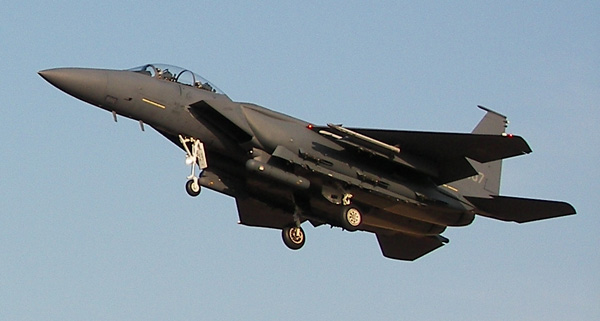
F-15K on landing

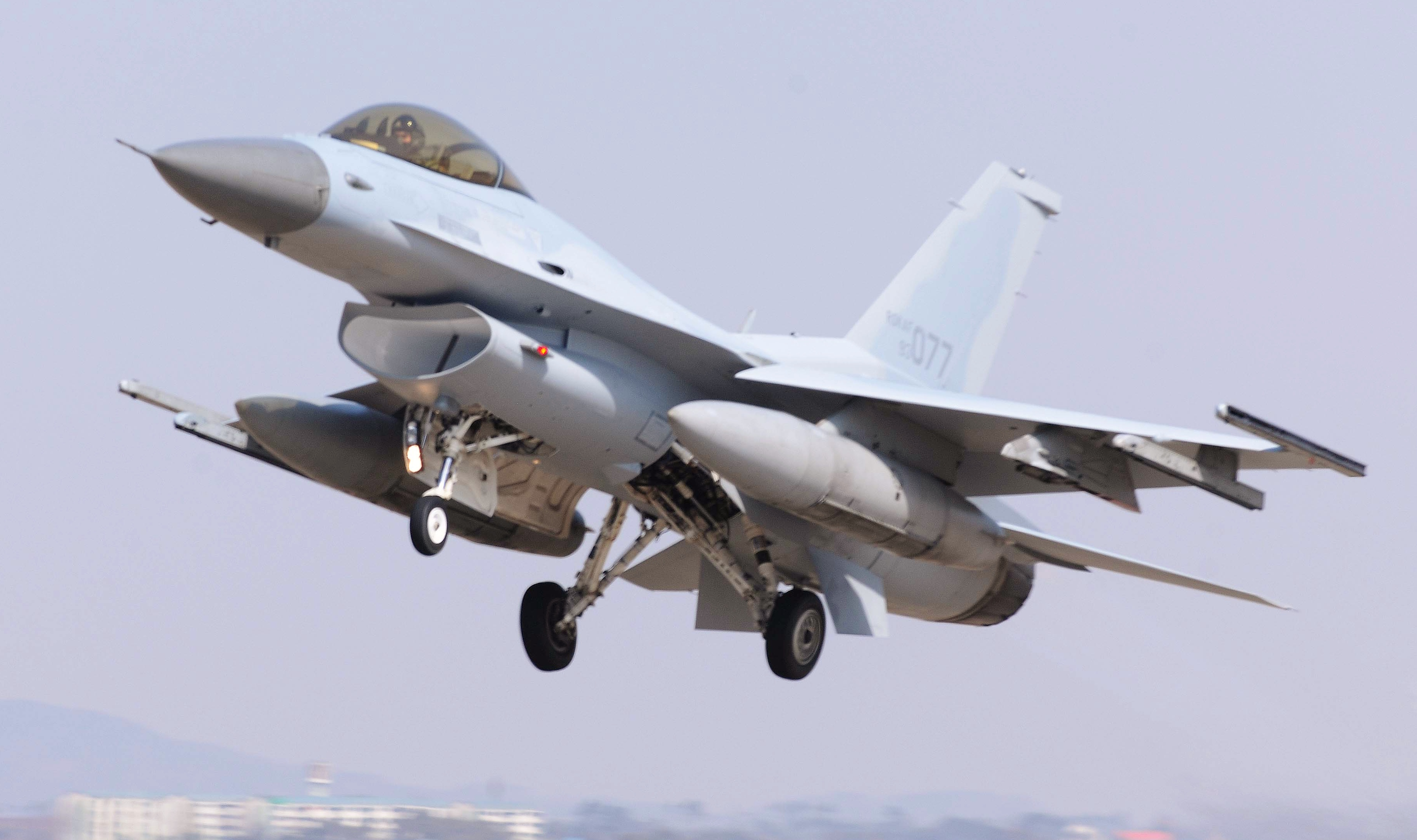
A F-16 Fighting Falcon on takeoff

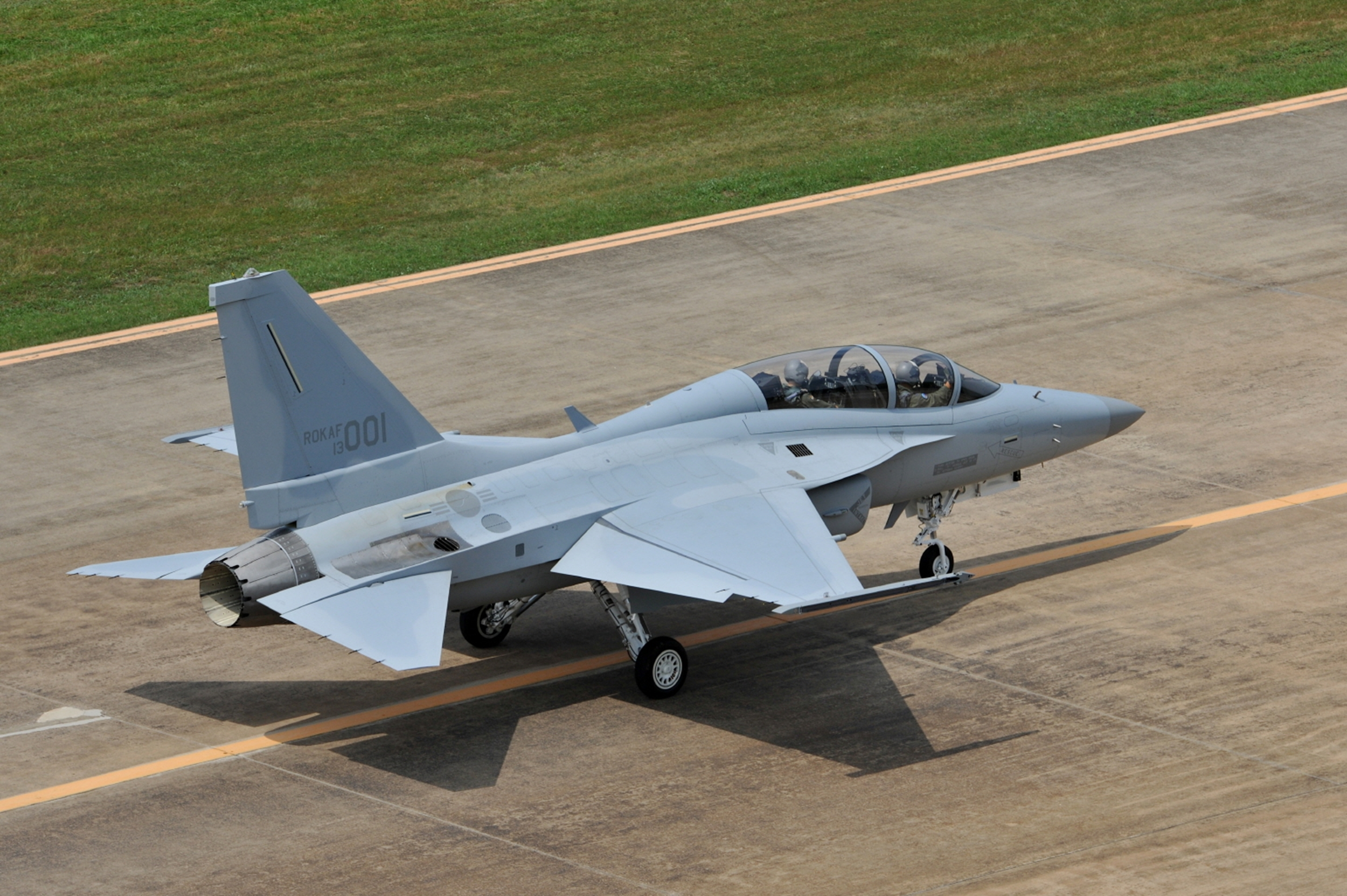
A FA-50 on first delivery

Aircraft	Origin	Type	Variant	In service	Notes
Combat aircraft
F-5 Tiger II	United States	fighter	KF-5E/F	61	
F-15E Strike Eagle	United States	multirole	F-15K	59	
F-16 Fighting Falcon	United States	multirole	KF-16C/U	118	
F-16 Fighting Falcon	United States	multirole	KF-16D	49	Also provide conversion training
F-35 Lightning II	United States	multirole	F-35A	40	20 on order
KF-21 Boramae	Republic of Korea	air superiority	Block 1	6 prototypes, 1 in service	20 on order
T-50 Golden Eagle	Republic of Korea	light multirole	FA-50	60	
AWACS
Bombardier Global 6500	Canada	AEW&C		4	Ordered in October 2025.
E-7 Wedgetail	United States	AEW&C	E-737	4	Equipped with a MESA radar
Electronic warfare
Bombardier Global 6500	Canada	Electronic warfare		2	Ordered in October 2025.
Reconnaissance
Dassault Falcon	France	EW / ELINT	2000	2	4 on order
Hawker 800	United Kingdom	reconnaissance / SIGINT	RC-800s	8	
Tanker
Airbus A330 MRTT	France	refueling / transport	KC-330	4	
Transport
Antonov An-2	Soviet Union	transport/utility			Used as aggressor aircraft
Boeing 737	United States	VIP	737 MAX 8	1	
Boeing 747	United States	VIP	747-8I	1	Presidential transport operated as Code One leased from Korean Air
CASA CN-235	Spain / Indonesia	transport / utility		18	
C-130 Hercules	United States	tactical airlifter	C-130H	12	
C-130J Super Hercules	United States	tactical airlifter		4	
C-390 Millennium	Brazil	transport / utility			3 on order
Helicopters
AS332 Super Puma	France	utility / transport		3	
Bell 412	United States	utility		3	
CH-47 Chinook	United States	transport / CSAR	HH-47D	9	
Sikorsky S-70	United States	utility / CSAR	HH-60P	17	
Sikorsky S-92	United States	VIP		3	
Trainer aircraft
KC-100 Naraon	Republic of Korea	trainer	KT-100	23	
KT-1 Woongbi	Republic of Korea	trainer	KT-1	103	
KT-1 Woongbi	Republic of Korea	light attack	KA-1	103	
T-50 Golden Eagle	Republic of Korea	trainer	T-50	72	
T-50 Golden Eagle	Republic of Korea	Aerobatic-specialized	T-50B	10	Used by Black Eagles aerobatic team
T-50 Golden Eagle	Republic of Korea	LIFT	TA-50	22	20 Block II on order.
UAV
RQ-4 Global Hawk	United States	surveillance		4	

==== Retired aircraft ====
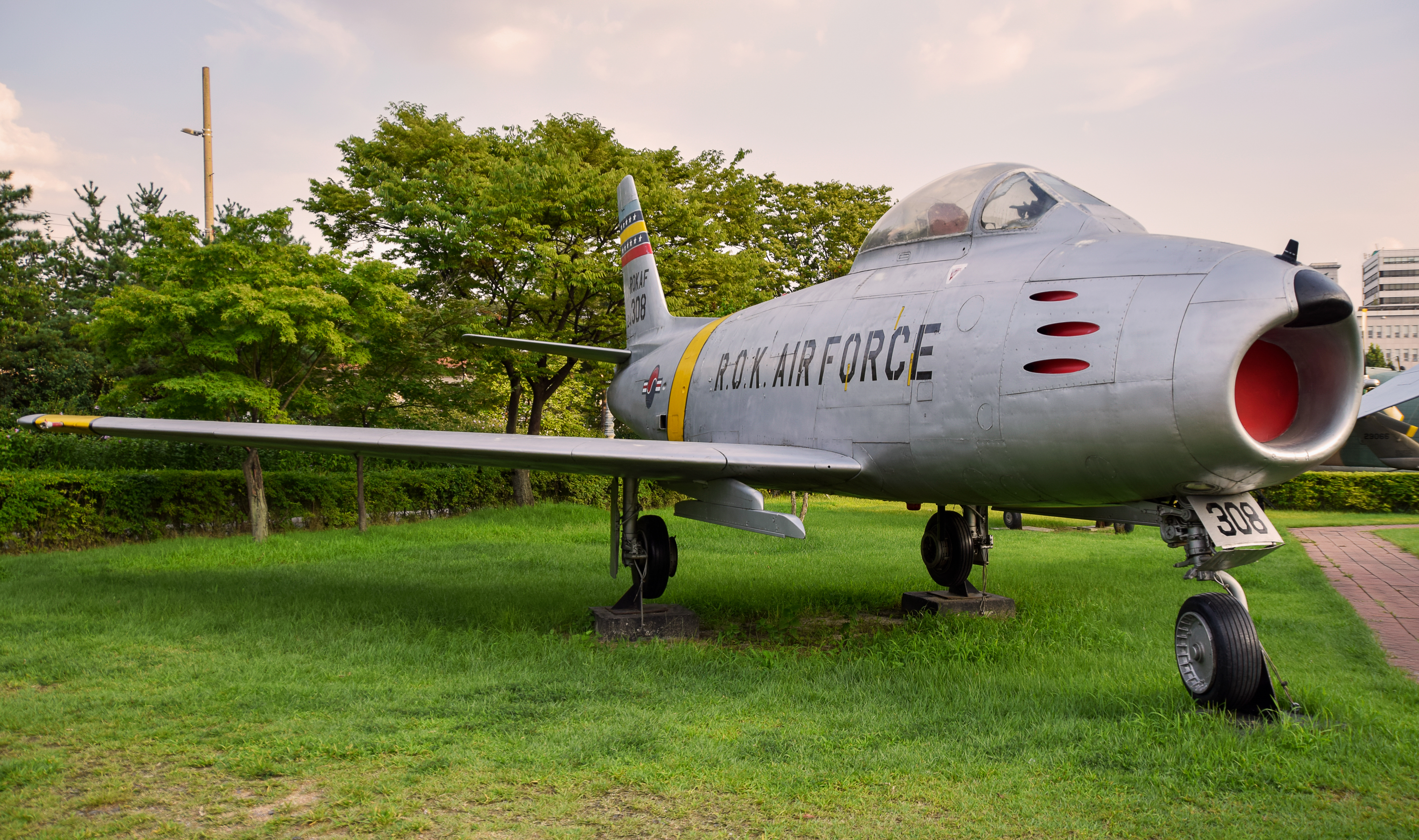
Retired North American F-86F Sabre of the ROKAF on display

Previous aircraft operated by the Republic of Korea Air Force consisted of the following aircraft.

- A-37B Dragonfly
- BAe 748
- C-46 Commando
- C-47 Skytrain
- F-4D Phantom II
- F-4E Phantom II
- F-86F Sabre
- F-86D Sabre Dog
- H-19 Chickasaw
- HH-32
- Il-103
- P-51 Mustang
- RF-4C Phantom II
- S-2 Tracker
- T-6 Texan
- T-28 Trojan
- T-33A Shooting Star
- Hawk Mk.67
- T-37C Tweet
- T-38A Talon
- UH-1 Huey

=== Air defence ===
The ROKAF Air Defence Artillery Command transferred from the Republic of Korea Army's air defense artillery and was established as a basic branch on 1 July 1991.

Name	Origin	Type	Variant	In service	Notes
Surface-to-air missile
MIM-104 Patriot	United States	ABM / SAM system	PAC-3	8 batteries	
KM-SAM Cheongung	Republic of Korea	medium range ABM / SAM system	Block I	18 batteries	
KM-SAM Cheongung	Republic of Korea	medium range ABM / SAM system	Block II	1 (7 on order)	
Anti-aircraft artillery
M167 VADS	Republic of Korea	anti-aircraft gun	KM167A3	200	20mm anti-aircraft gun
Man-portable air-defense system
KP-SAM Shingung	Republic of Korea	man-portable air-defense system		2,000	

== Military ranks ==
Officer ranks can be learned fairly easily if one sees the pattern. So equals small; Jung equals medium; Dae equals large. Jun equals the prefix sub-. Each of these is coupled with wi equals company grade, ryeong equals field grade, and jang equals general. This system is due to the hanja or Sino-Korean origin of the names.

Rank group	General/Flag/Air officers					Senior officers			Junior officers
Republic of Korea Air Force
Republic of Korea Air Force	원수; Wonsu	대장; Daejang	중장; Jungjang	소장; Sojang	준장; Junjang	대령; Daeryeong	중령; Jungnyeong	소령; Soryeong	대위; Daewi	중위; Jungwi	소위; Sowi

Rank Group	Warrant officer
Republic of Korea Air Force
Republic of Korea Air Force	준위; Junwi

Rank group	Non-commissioned officer				Enlisted
Republic of Korea Air Force
Republic of Korea Air Force	원사; Wonsa	상사; Sangsa	중사; Jungsa	하사; Hasa	병장; Byeongjang	상등병; Sangdeungbyeong	일등병; Ildeungbyeong	이등병; Ideungbyeong

== Roundels ==
2000–present

2000–present
(low-visibility)

1951–2000

1950s

== See also ==
- Chief of Staff of the Air Force (South Korea)
- Republic of Korea Armed Forces
- Korean People's Army Air Force
