= HMY =

HMY may refer to:

- Hairmyres railway station, in Scotland
- HMY Airways, a defunct Canadian airline
- Seosan Air Base, in South Korea
- Southern Guiyang Miao language, spoken in China
- His or Her Majesty's Yacht, a ship prefix; see His Majesty's Ship
