= Ilyushin Il-103 =

1994 Russian training aircraft

Il-103
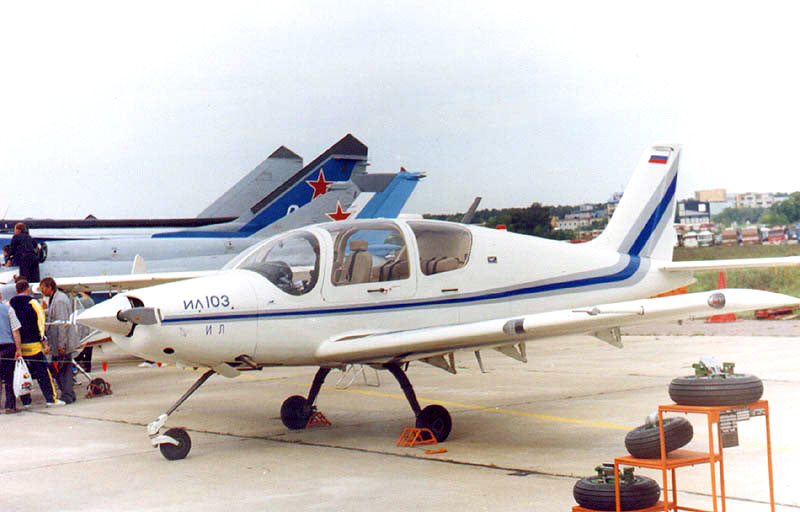
- Il-103 at MAKS, Zhukovskiy, 1999.

General information
- Type: Training aircraft
- National origin: Soviet Union / Russia
- Manufacturer: Ilyushin
- Designer: Genrikh Novozhilov
- Status: In service
- Primary user: see Operators
- Number built: 66

History
- Manufactured: 1994–present
- Introduction date: 1996
- First flight: 17 May 1994

The Ilyushin Il-103 is a single-engine, low-wing training aircraft developed by the Ilyushin Design Bureau that started in 1990 in the Soviet Union. The aircraft is now produced in Russia. It was the first Russian aircraft to achieve Federal Aviation Administration certification in 1998, it is for sale in the United States.

== Operational history ==
=== Russia ===
Reviewers Dave Unwin and Marino Boric described the design in a 2015 review as "very robust, safe and comfortable. It was designed for everyday operation on poor runways and with the ability to cope with every variation of the harsh Russian climate."

=== Hungary ===
Russia’s United Aircraft Corporation reached an agreement with Aviation Engineering Zrt of Pécs, Hungary, to develop and licence produce a modernised version of the Ilyushin Il-103 in Hungary in March 2021.

=== South Korea ===
In the early 2000s, 23 IL-103s were delivered to South Korea by the Russian Federation as debt repayments, locally they were designated at T-103s, and based out of Seongmu base with the Air force's Academy. They were eventually phased out, and replaced with the indigenous KC-100.

== Operators ==
=== Current ===
Laos

- Lao People's Liberation Army Air Force: three delivered with 21 ordered

Peru

- Peruvian Army: Five operated out six delivered.

=== Former ===
South Korea

- Republic of Korea Air Force - 23 delivered as part of debt repayments, used as a basic trainer. Replaced by indigenous aircraft.

== Specifications (Il-103) ==
Data from

General characteristics

- Crew: 1
- Capacity: 4 pax ( max payload: 270 kg (600 lb))
- Length: 8 m (26 ft 3 in)
- Wingspan: 10.56 m (34 ft 8 in)
- Height: 3.135 m (10 ft 3 in)
- Wing area: 14.71 m^{2} (158.3 sq ft)
- Aspect ratio: 7.6
- Empty weight: 900 kg (1,984 lb)
- Max takeoff weight: 1,310 kg (2,888 lb)
- Fuel capacity: 150 kg (330 lb) / 200 L (53 US gal; 44 imp gal) in two wing tanks
- Powerplant: 1 × Teledyne Continental IO-360-ES2B 6-cyl. air-cooled horizontally-opposed piston engine, 157 kW (211 hp)
- Propellers: 2-bladed Hartzell BHC-C2YF-1BF/F8459A-8R

Performance

- Maximum speed: 220 km/h (140 mph, 120 kn)
- Cruise speed: 180 km/h (110 mph, 97 kn)
- Stall speed: 117 km/h (73 mph, 63 kn) flaps up; 111 km/h (69 mph; 60 kn) 10° flaps
- Never exceed speed: 340 km/h (210 mph, 180 kn)
- Range: 800 km (500 mi, 430 nmi) (at cruising speed, pilot and 270 kg (600 lb) payload with 30 min fuel reserve)
- Service ceiling: 3,000 m (9,840 ft) (maximum certified altitude)
- g limits: Utility: =4.4 / -1.8; Aerobatic: +6 / -3
- Rate of climb: 3.167 m/s (623.4 ft/min)
- Wing loading: 89.1 kg/m^{2} (18.2 lb/sq ft)
- Power/mass: 8.37 kg/kW (13.75 lb/hp)

== See also ==
Aircraft of comparable role, configuration, and era

- Beechcraft Musketeer
- Cessna 172
- Piper Cherokee
- Socata TB-10
