= KAI KC-100 Naraon =

South Korean four-seat light aircraft

KC-100 Naraon
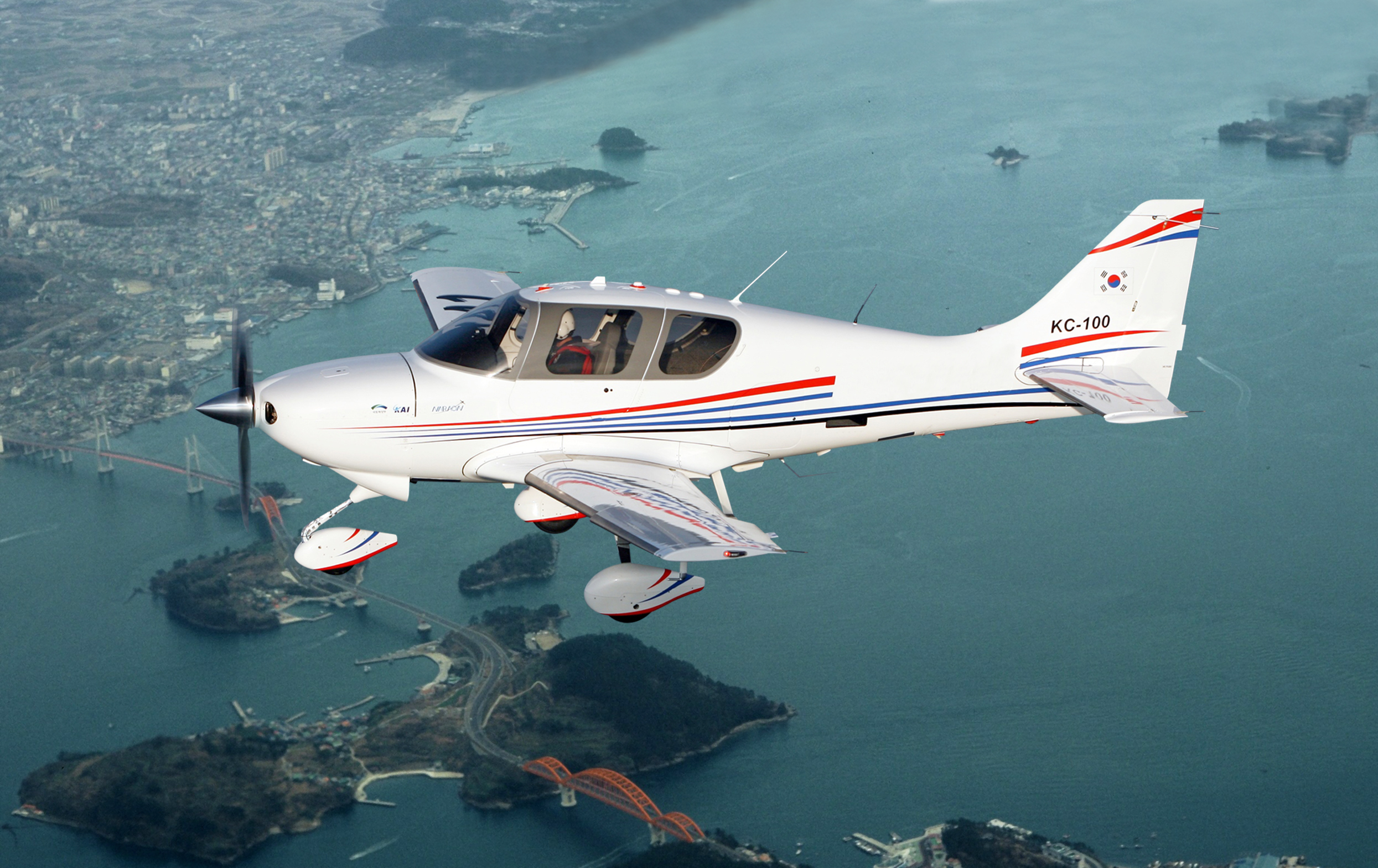

General information
- Type: Light aircraft
- National origin: South Korea
- Manufacturer: Korea Aerospace Industries
- Status: In service
- Primary user: Republic of Korea Air Force

History
- Introduction date: 2015
- First flight: 15 July 2011

The KAI KC-100 Naraon is a South Korean four-seat, low-wing, single-engine light aircraft developed and manufactured by Korea Aerospace Industries (KAI). The name Naraon was chosen based on public input. It has the distinction of being the first civil-orientated aircraft to be developed in South Korea.

Keen to break into the civilian market, KAI formally launched development of the KC-100 during 2008. While largely conventional in its basic configuration, use of composite materials and the adoption of cutting-edge technologies were intended to allow the new aircraft to be 10% more fuel efficient than existing rivals. On 15 July 2011, the prototype KC-100 performed the type's maiden flight. The flight test programme was completed successfully on 22 March 2013, shortly after which the aircraft received type certification, permitting its use by civil operators. During the 2010s, KAI commenced development of a military trainer variant, designated KT-100, for the South Korean Air Force; the first aircraft of this model first flew during 2015.

== Development ==
Throughout the majority of its existence, South Korean aviation company Korean Aerospace Industries (KAI) had been principally engaged in both Korean government and military projects, such as the KUH-1 Surion, T-50 Golden Eagle, and the KT-1 Woongbi. Several of the company's officials desired to moved beyond traditional government-directed military projects and for KAI to produce designs that appealed to the commercial and civilian aviation sectors. For decades, South Korea has been forced to import all non-military aircraft due to a lack of domestic options. However, any prospective civil aircraft would face a radically different type certification process than the company's existing military products; successfully passing this process would be necessary to complete the launch of any civil aircraft into service. Thus, the company would closely coordinate with the Korea Office of Civil Aviation (KOCA), the regulatory authority that oversaw the nation's aviation industry, while continuing to hone its ideas for civil programme.

KAI identified that a four-seat civil aircraft could be reasonably certified under KAS (Korea Airworthiness Standard) Part 23. The proposed aircraft would be developed using a high proportion of indigenously developed technology, refined by guidance provided by KOCA. KAI engineers believed that by making extensive use of composite materials, significant reductions in both weight and fuel consumption could be made. It was also determined that up to 90% of the aircraft's technology could be domestically sourced. A major design goal of the project was the production of an aircraft that would be 10% more fuel efficient than other contemporary aircraft in its class, along with a cabin around 1 to 2 in (3 to 5 cm) wider that either the Cirrus SR-22 or Cessna 400. The general configuration adopted for the aircraft was a largely traditional one, pairing a low-mounted wing with a conventional tail.

During June 2008, development work officially commenced on the initiative. At this point, it had been anticipated that the project would be completed within a five-year development timeframe. By May 2010, the preliminary design phase had been completed and construction of the first prototype was set to commence, with the aim of completion around the end of that year. Commenting in 2011, the company stated that it expected deliveries to commence during mid-2013, and that each aircraft would have a forecast price of US$575,000. Reportedly, KAI has ambitions to launch further civilian projects, including business jets, following the completion of development of the KC-100.

On 15 June 2011, the first prototype performed its maiden flight, the flight test programme commencing immediately thereafter. Reportedly, KAI aim to secure type certification not only in South Korea, but also from the European Aviation Safety Agency (EASA) and the Federal Aviation Administration (FAA), thus allowing the KC-100 to be sold in many countries around the world. Roughly half of all test flights were conducted to explore and validate the KC-100's aerodynamic properties, while 17% were to prove the avionics, 10% were related to the engine, and 7% related to the structure. On 22 March 2013, the flight test programme, which was carried out in partnership with KOCA and had involved 559 sorties by two flying prototypes, was officially completed. One week later, type certification was granted to the KC-100.

== Design ==
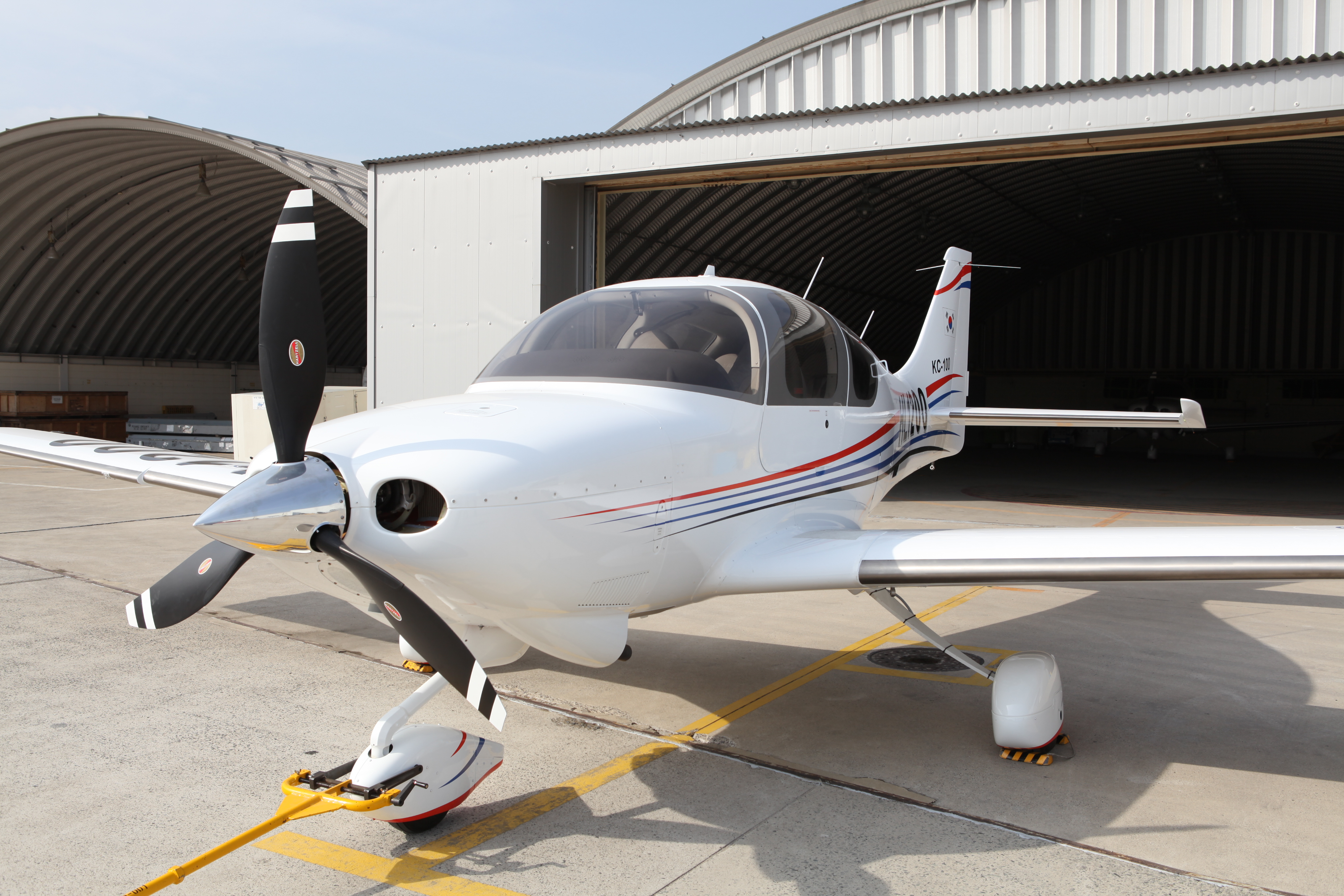
KAI KC-100 Naraon

The Korean Aerospace Industries KC-100 is a four-seat light aircraft intended for general aviation purposes, such as small-scale commercial and commuting activities, flight training, and leisure and private flights. It possesses an all-composite airframe, being constructed primarily from carbon fibre. The use of such materials reduces overall weight, simplifies manufacture and reduces maintenance costs. The spacious cabin has been designed to appeal to both leisure and business customers. Access to the cabin is via gull-wing doors on both sides of the fuselage.

Significant attention was paid during development to the KC-100's aerodynamics; for example, the wing employs a laminar flow airfoil and has winglets, while the flight controls incorporate an aileron-rudder interconnection (ARI) system, the latter being aimed at augmenting the aircraft's lateral stability. The ARI was one of several modifications implemented based upon feedback from the KC-100's flight test programme. The avionics incorporates the Avidyne Entegra II glass cockpit, which includes various subsystems, including the flight control system, dual high-resolution integrated flight displays, MLB700/MLX770 data link, FMS900w flight management system, digital VHF radio, and DFC100 autopilot. A key safety feature is an airborne collision avoidance system.

The KC-100 is powered by a single American-built Continental TSIOF-550-K turbocharged 315 hp (235 kW) piston engine, which is controlled via a full authority digital engine (FADEC) system. During 2010, consideration was given to using the Austro AE300, which runs on cheaper diesel fuel instead of avgas, which is thought to better suit the trainer market. The engine drives a Hartzell-built composite three-blade ASC-II propeller at a nominal speed of 2500 rpm. The aircraft is equipped with a TKS anti-icing system, along with air conditioning and a supplemental oxygen system, as standard equipment. The KC-100 can be outfitted with a Spin Recovery Parachute System (SRPS), which is capable of automatically deploying when onboard sensors recognize excessive spin and is intended to assist pilots in the safe recovery of the aircraft. The SRPS is not in a standard fit item, it has instead been made available as an optional extra.

== Operational history ==
During May 2014, the South Korean Air Force (SKAF) academy entered a memorandum of understanding to obtain a military trainer variant of the KC-100, designated KT-100; this was the first mass production contract to be received for the aircraft. Once delivered, the KT-100 fleet will replace the 20 Ilyushin Il-103 aircraft currently stationed at the academy, where they shall be used to familiarize students with flying. On 5 October 2015, the first KT-100 conducted its maiden flight; at that point, all aircraft were expected to have been delivered by the end of 2016.

== Variants ==
KC-100
Four-seat light aircraft
KT-100
Military trainer variant

== Specifications (KC-100) ==
Data from Korea Aerospace Industries and AVweb

General characteristics

- Crew: one
- Capacity: 3 passengers
- Length: 8 m (26 ft 3 in)
- Wingspan: 11.29 m (37 ft 0 in)
- Height: 2.71 m (8 ft 8.9 in)
- Airfoil: laminar flow
- Max takeoff weight: 1,633 kg (3,600 lb)
- Powerplant: 1 × Continental TSIOF-550-K , 235 kW (315 hp)

Performance

- Maximum speed: 370 km/h (230 mph, 200 kn)
- Range: 1,900 km (1,200 mi, 1,000 nmi)

Avionics

- Avidyne Entegra II glass cockpit

== See also ==
Aircraft of comparable role, configuration, and era

- Cessna 400
- Cirrus SR-22
- Korean Air Chang-Gong 91 - earlier South Korean light aircraft project
