= Korean Air Chang-Gong 91 =

Chang-Gong 91

General information
- Type: Four-seat light monoplane
- National origin: South Korea
- Manufacturer: Korean Air Aerospace Division

History
- First flight: 22 November 1991

The Korean Air Chang-Gong 91 (English: Blue Sky 91) is a four-seat single-engined low-wing monoplane designed by the Korea Institute of Aeronautical Technology and built by the Aerospace Division of Korean Air.

== Specifications ==
Data from

General characteristics

- Crew: 1
- Capacity: 3
- Length: 7.74 m (25 ft 5 in)
- Wingspan: 10.2 m (33 ft 5 in)
- Height: 2.7 m (8 ft 10 in)
- Wing area: 14.86 m^{2} (160 sq ft)
- Empty weight: 839 kg (1,850 lb)
- Gross weight: 1,225 kg (2,700 lb)
- Powerplant: 1 × Lycoming IO-360-A1B6 piston engine , 149 kW (200 hp)

Performance

- Maximum speed: 339 km/h (210 mph, 180 kn)
- Range: 1,500 km (932 mi, 810 nmi)
- Service ceiling: 5,025 m (16,500 ft)

== See also ==
Aircraft of comparable role, configuration, and era

- KAI KC-100 Naraon - later South Korean light aircraft project
