= 2025 Pocheon accidental bombing =

Accidental aerial bombing in South Korea

2025 Pocheon bombing
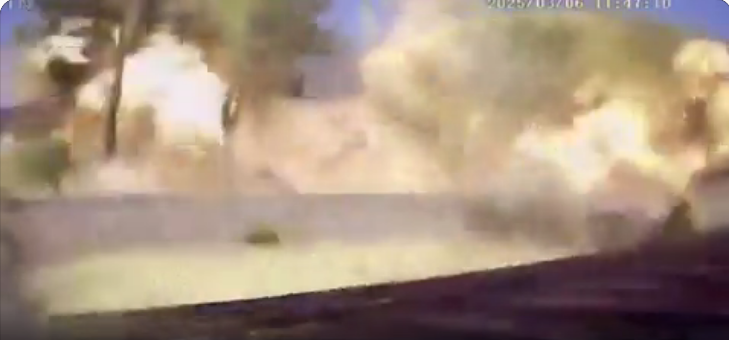
- A CCTV still of an explosion after the bombs were dropped
- Location: Pocheon, Gyeonggi Province, South Korea
- Date: 6 March 2025; 10:04 KST (UTC+09)
- Attack type: Negligent aerial bombing
- Injuries: 29 civilians, 14 soldiers

On 6 March 2025, two South Korean Air Force KF-16 jets negligently dropped a total of eight Mark 82 bombs on a civilian-populated area in Pocheon, Gyeonggi Province, South Korea that injured 43 people. The area was close to a bombing range. The incident occurred during a joint drill that took place between South Korea and the United States.

== Bombing ==
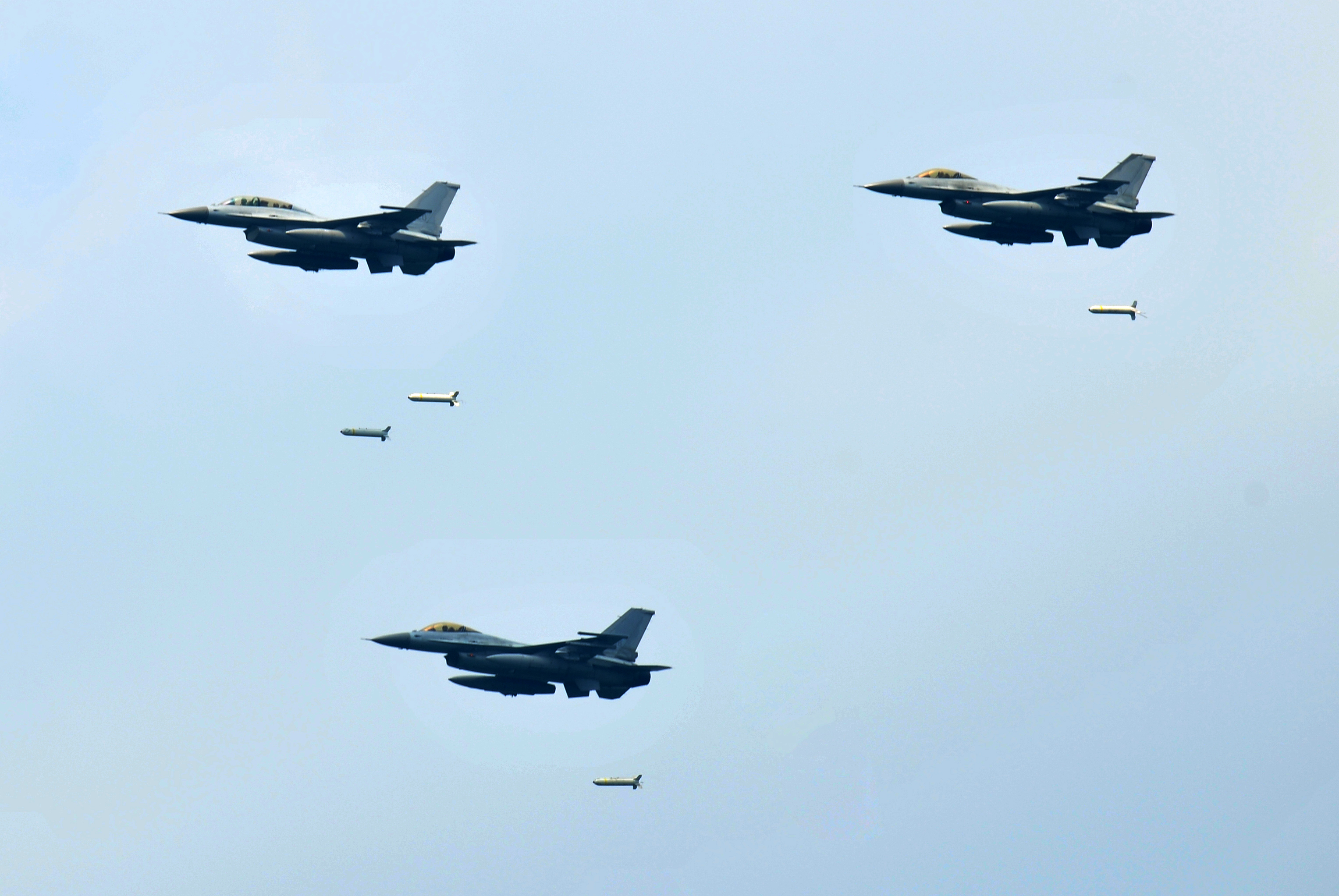
Three KF-16s of the South Korean Air Force, similar to the two aircraft involved, release bombs as part of an exercise in 2012.

The bombing took place at 10:04 KST. According to the South Korean military, a KF-16 pilot entered incorrect coordinates before releasing Mark 82 bombs on a civilian-populated area. A second jet later also dropped its bombs; the cause is being investigated. A total of eight Mark 82 bombs were dropped.

Forty-three people were injured, including two seriously. Seven civilians were still in hospital six days later. One hundred and sixty-three buildings, including a church, and three vehicles were badly damaged.

The live-fire exercise at the Seungjin Science and Technology Training Center, involving about 500 troops and over 150 pieces of military equipment, was preparatory to the forthcoming annual 11-day non-stop Freedom Shield joint exercise on 10 to 20 March.

Air force officials stated there should have been three target verification steps, when pre-loading the coordinates from a storage device into the KF-16, during the flight, and finally visually confirming the target.

== Aftermath ==
After the bombing, residents of Pocheon were evacuated as bomb disposal teams searched for unexploded ordnance. The South Korean military said that live fire exercises were suspended in the aftermath of the bombing. The South Korean Air Force said they were investigating the incident and that they would compensate its victims. The suspension was partially lifted on 18 March.

On 11 March 2025, two senior air force officers, a colonel and a lieutenant colonel, were dismissed by the Republic of Korea Air Force for breaching their legal duties and poorly overseeing safety details. The interim investigation showed that an airman mistyped the coordinates and omitted the first verification procedure, allegedly following a printer error. Later a pilot incorrectly reported that he saw the target location at a time when he could not have seen it.

On 13 March 2025, the Ministry of National Defense charged two pilots with occupational negligence for dropping the bombs at the incorrect location. The said pilots were issued with a one-year suspension by the Air Force on 21 March 2025.

== Reactions ==
For many years residents have protested about the disturbance and danger from the nearby training grounds, and on the day following the incident residents and activists held a rally outside the main Ministry of National Defense building to demand a halt to military drills that threaten residents' lives.

In North Korea, the Korean Central News Agency made reference to the bombing in its criticism of joint military drills by South Korea and the United States on 12 March.

== See also ==
- List of accidents and incidents involving military aircraft (2020–present)
