= Buhwal-ho =

South Korean aircraft model

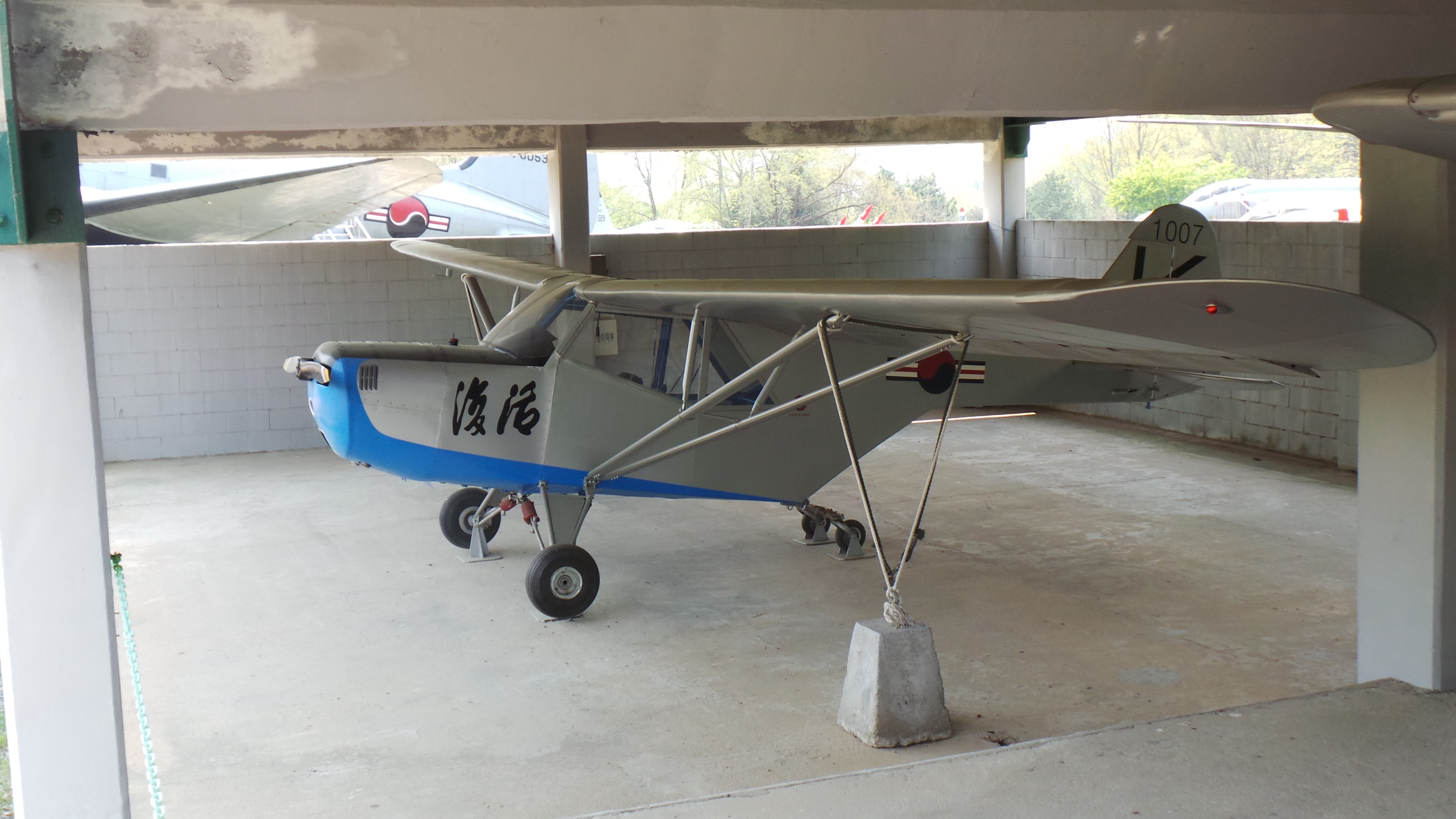
Restored Buhwal-ho, Now on exhibiting in National Museum of the R.O.K. Air Force

Buhwal (Korean: 부활; Hanja: 復活; means "revival" or "resurrection" is the first domestically-developed powered aircraft of Republic of Korea. R.O.K. Air Force Technical School led its development and the test flight was conducted in October 1953. It is liaison, observation and psychological warfare aircraft. The name "Buhwal" was given by president Syngman Rhee. The aircraft was disappeared after 1960s but hard effort of Wonbok Lee(1926-2021), who was in charge of the development, made the aircraft could be excavated in Gyeongsang Technical High School in January 2004. After the excavation, R.O.K. Air Force conducted restoration on fuselage frame of the aircraft and the project was completed in october 2004. It was designated by Registered Cultural Property in October 2008. After that, South Gyeongsang Province and Sacheon city conducted "improve-restoration" project and two flyable aircraft were made in June 2011. Restored Buhwal was designated as a National Scientific Heritage in July 2020.
