= Seosan Air Base =

Airbase in South Korea

- IATA: HMY; ICAO: RKTP

Summary
- Airport type: Military
- Owner/Operator: Republic of Korea Air Force
- Location: Seosan, South Korea
- Elevation AMSL: 39 ft / 12 m
- Coordinates: 36°42′20″N 126°29′14″E
- Interactive map of Seosan Air Base

Runways
Direction	Length		Surface
Direction	m	ft	Surface
03R/21L		9,000	concrete
03L/21R		9,000	concrete
- Source: DAFIF

Seosan Air Base (IATA: HMY, ICAO: RKTP) is a Republic of Korea Air Force (ROKAF) base located near Seosan city in South Chungcheong Province, South Korea.

== Units stationed ==
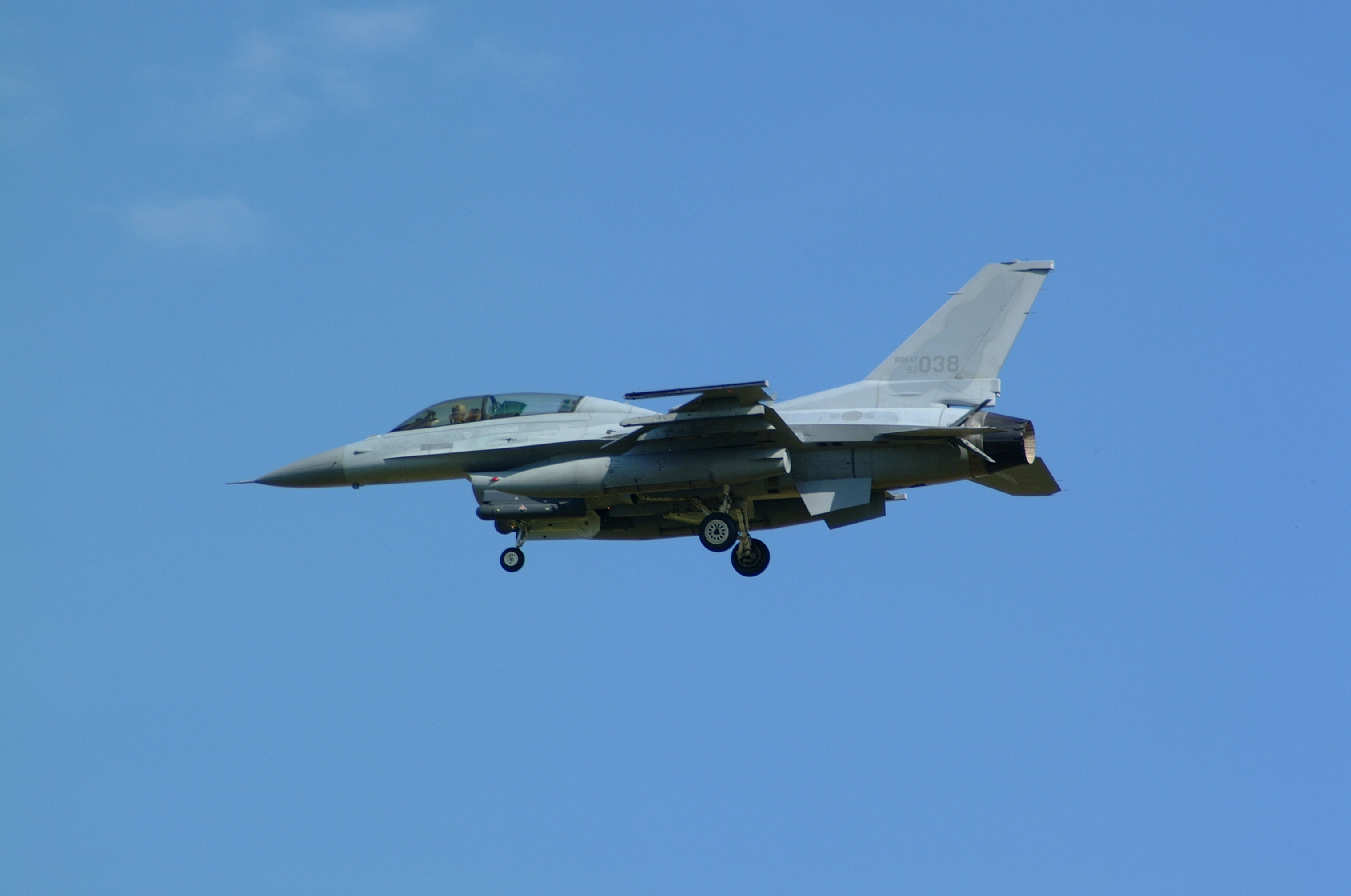
KF-16D landing at Seosan

The base is home to the ROKAF 20th Fighter Wing (제20전투비행단), comprising:

- 120th Fighter Squadron flying KF-16C/D (Block52)
- 121st Fighter Squadron flying KF-16C/D (Block52)
- 123rd Fighter Squadron flying KF-16C/D (Block52)
- 157th Fighter Squadron flying KF-16C/D (Block52)

== Accidents and incidents ==
- 18 September 1997, KF-16C #92-004 crashed due to engine failure, the pilot ejected successfully
- 26 February 2002, KF-16C-52 #93-4087 crashed due to an engine fire, the pilot ejected successfully
- 20 July 2007, KF-16D #93-117 crashed at sea on a night flight from Seosan, both crewmen were killed
