= Pocheon =

City in Gyeonggi, South Korea

Coordinates: 37°53′41″N 127°12′01″E

- Municipal City
- Panoramic view of modern-day Pocheon-dong and Seondan-dong.

- Flag Emblem of Pocheon

- Location in South Korea
- Country: South Korea
- Region: Gyeonggi Province (Sudogwon)
- Administrative divisions: 1 eup, 11 myeon, 2 dong

Government
  - mayor: Baek Yeong-hyeon (백영현)

Area
  - Total: 827 km^{2} (319 sq mi)

Population (September 2024)
  - Total: 141,825
  - Density: 171/km^{2} (444/sq mi)
  - Dialect: Seoul

Korean name
- Hangul: 포천시
- Hanja: 抱川市
- RR: Pocheon-si
- MR: P'och'ŏn-si

Pocheon (Korean: 포천; Korean pronunciation: [pʰo.tɕʰʌn]) is an inland city in northeast Gyeonggi Province, South Korea. It covers 826.48 km (513.55 mi)^{2} with a population of 160,176 people, according to the 2008 census. Pocheon lies between Seoul and the mountainous northwestern areas of Gangwon Province. The city borders Yeoncheon county, with the cities of Dongducheon and Yangju to the west, along with Uijeongbu, and Namyangju of Gyeonggi province to the south. It also borders Hwacheon county of Gangwon province on its eastern border and Cheorwon is to the north. Alongside the adjoining Gapyeong, Pocheon consists of the highest mountainous areas in Gyeonggi province. The current city of Pocheon was created after Pocheon-hyeon and Yeongpyeong counties were merged. The north part of the city used to be part of Yeongpyeong county while the south used to be part of Pocheon-hyeon.

== History ==
The city of Pocheon belonged to Mahan during the Samhan period and was part of Mahol during the Goguryeo period. After the Korean peninsula was unified by Silla, it was called Gyeonseong-gun (堅城郡). As Silla was absorbed by the ruling dynasty, Goryeo, the name was changed to Poju-gun (抱州郡) in 995, the 14th year of King Seongjeong's reign. During the King Hyeonjong's reign, the region belonged to Yangju-gun, Yanggwang-do. In the next ruling dynasty, Joseon, the region was named Pocheon-gun after the eight province system was established in 1413.

On 6 March 2025, South Korean Air Force accidentally dropped bombs in the city, injuring 15.

== Geography and climate ==
The peak of the Gwangju Mountains stretches from the northeast of Pocheon to the southeast. Except for the Pocheon basin, most regions of the city consist of high mountains.

Pocheon has two main water sources; Yeongpyeongcheon stream and Sannaecheon stream. The tributaries of Yeongpyeongcheon stream are the Pocheoncheon stream running through Pocheon-dong and Seondan-dong areas and the Ildongcheon stream passing through Ildong-myeon. The two streams merge into Yeongpyeongcheon which passes Auraji Ferry in Sindap-ri, Yeoncheon county and finally ends up to reach Hantan River. The other main water source, Sannaecheonm, runs through Choseong-ri village, Yeoncheon county and also reaches Hantan River. The two stream areas are relatively wide, so that it enables for the residents to use as cultivation places and resident places.

Pocheon is located inland, so its weather shows a humid continental climate (Köppen: Dwa) with cold, dry winters and hot, rainy summers. The annual average temperature is 11.4 °C (52.5 °F). The coldest month is January with an average minimum temperature of −7.3 °C (18.9 °F) while the hottest month is August with an average temperature of 25.3 °C (77.5 °F). The annual average rainfall is 1,368 mm (53.9 in).

Climate data for Pocheon (1993–2020 normals)
Month	Jan	Feb	Mar	Apr	May	Jun	Jul	Aug	Sep	Oct	Nov	Dec	Year
Mean daily maximum °C (°F)	1.8 (35.2)	5.3 (41.5)	11.6 (52.9)	18.8 (65.8)	24.5 (76.1)	28.6 (83.5)	29.8 (85.6)	30.7 (87.3)	26.4 (79.5)	20.3 (68.5)	11.6 (52.9)	3.6 (38.5)	17.8 (64.0)
Daily mean °C (°F)	−4.5 (23.9)	−1.1 (30.0)	4.8 (40.6)	11.6 (52.9)	17.6 (63.7)	22.4 (72.3)	24.9 (76.8)	25.3 (77.5)	19.9 (67.8)	12.7 (54.9)	5.2 (41.4)	−2.4 (27.7)	11.4 (52.5)
Mean daily minimum °C (°F)	−10.3 (13.5)	−7.1 (19.2)	−1.6 (29.1)	4.6 (40.3)	11.2 (52.2)	16.9 (62.4)	21.3 (70.3)	21.4 (70.5)	14.9 (58.8)	6.6 (43.9)	−0.4 (31.3)	−7.6 (18.3)	5.8 (42.4)
Average precipitation mm (inches)	13.0 (0.51)	21.1 (0.83)	29.6 (1.17)	67.3 (2.65)	91.6 (3.61)	128.2 (5.05)	397.1 (15.63)	378.1 (14.89)	124.6 (4.91)	56.1 (2.21)	44.1 (1.74)	17.4 (0.69)	1,368.2 (53.87)
Average precipitation days (≥ 0.1 mm)	2.9	3.3	5.2	6.7	7.0	8.4	13.4	12.9	6.9	5.5	6.2	4.4	82.8
Source: Korea Meteorological Administration

== Administrative divisions ==
- Changsu-myeon
- Gasan-myeon
- Gwanin-myeon
- Hwahyeon-myeon
- Ildong-myeon
- Sinbuk-myeon
- Yeongbuk-myeon
- Yeongjong-myeon
- Soheul-eup
- Jajak-dong
- Sineup-dong
- Seondan-dong

== Population ==
The population of the city was generally seen as being stagnant until the 1980s. Later on, when apartment buildings were constructed in Pocheon-dong, Seondan-dong, and Soheul-myeon, and small and medium-sized factories were established in Sinbuk-myeon and Gasan-myeon, its population increased.

== Economy ==
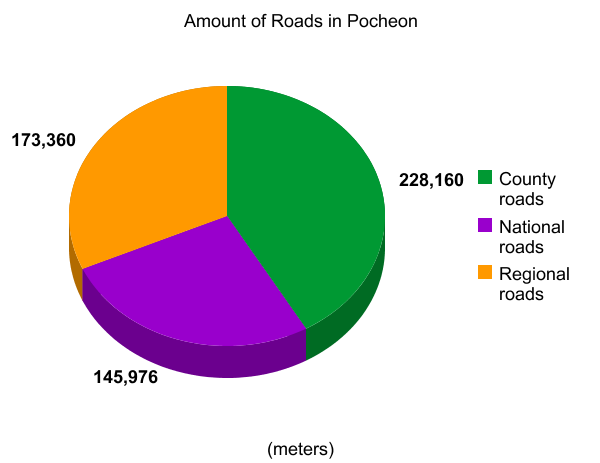

70 percent of the total area is forest, while arable land only accounts for 18.5 percent. The area with the lowest percentage of cultivatable area Idong-myeon with 6.5 percent in contrast to the highest region being Gasan-myeon with 39.6%. The main crops produced in Pocheon include rice and barley as well as sesame and perilla as local specialties. Sesames are produced in Ildong-myeon on a large scale, as is Perilia in Yeongbuk-myeon. In addition, oyster mushroom and poultry farming are active in the city. Ginseng and pine nuts are also often harvested due to the geographical features. The cultivation of apples and Korean pears (Pyrus pyrifolia) in Yeongbuk-myeon has been famous for many years. The livestock industry is active in Sinbuk-myeon, especially in areas such as raising Han-u (Korean traditional cattle) and pigs and in Hwahyeon-myeon.

Various types of minerals are produced in Pocheon such as feldspar in Naechon-myeon, coal, graphite, silica, gold, silver, and copper in Sinbuk-myeon and Changsu-myeon and iron ore, and limestone in Yeongbuk-myeon.

In the city, roughly 2,166 small and medium-sized manufacturers produce textiles and metal products. The commerce is developed mainly in Pocheon-dong and Seondan-dong. The Sin-eup 5 day market is held every fifth and tenth day of the month and garners a lot of customers. Pocheon makgeolli (unfiltered rice wine) and Idong galbi (marinated short ribs) are nationwide famous local specialties named after the city and Idong-myeon.

== Healthcare ==
In Pocheon there are three general hospitals, 39 health clinics, 16 dental clinics, and 11 traditional Korean clinics. In addition, one public health center, and 12 affiliated branches provide healthcare to the residents. a public general hospital "Gyeonggi Medical Center Pocheon Hospital" is located.

== Education ==
Pocheon has three institutions of tertiary education, which are Daejin University, CHA University, and Gyeongbok College. It also has 30 elementary schools, 12 middle schools, and 6 high schools.

== Tourism ==
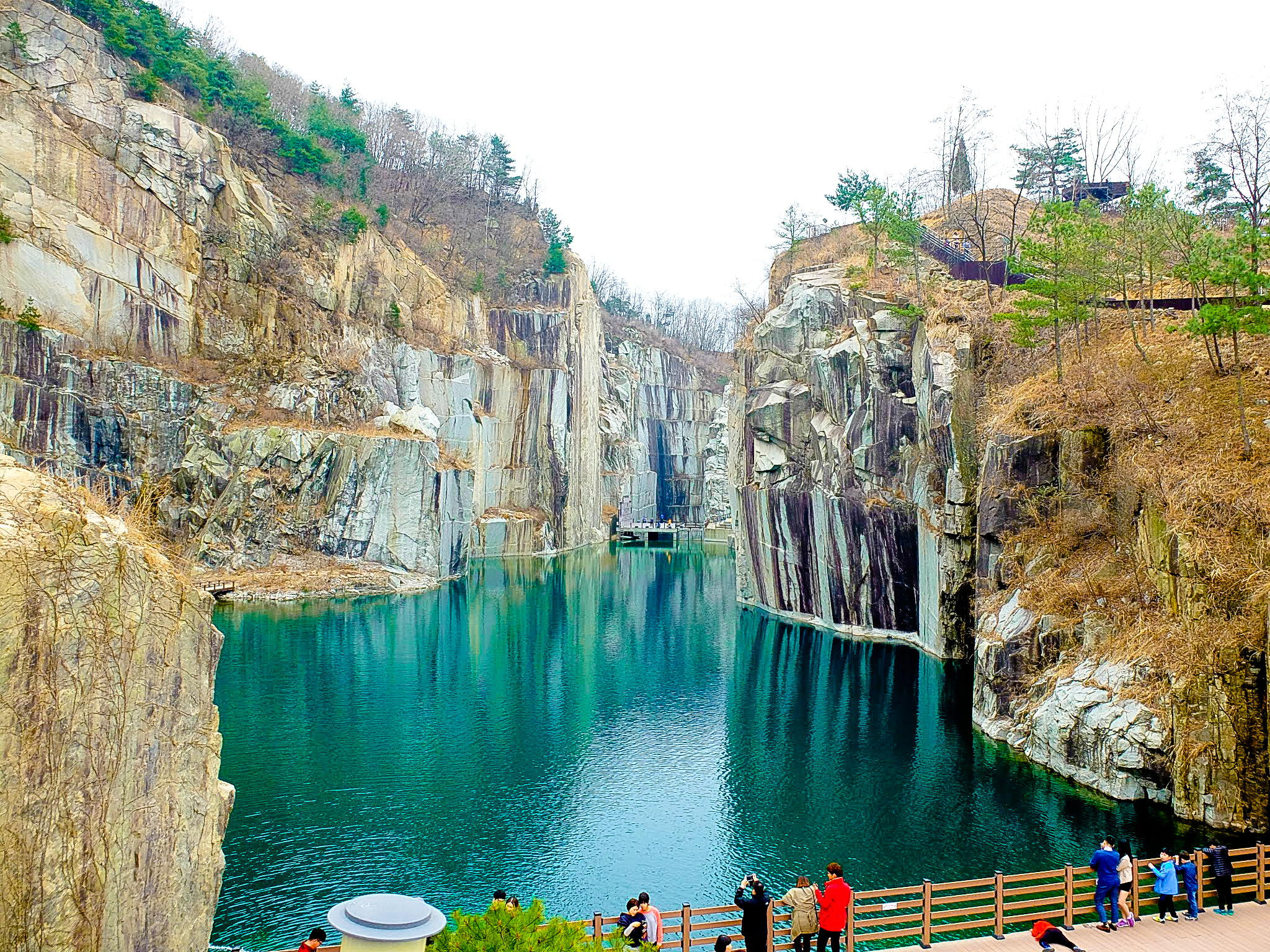
Pocheon Art Valley

Spring water spots are developed largely in the areas of Sanbuk-myeon, Yeongbuk-myeon, Ildong-myeon, and Hwahyeo-myeon to attract tourists. The Korea National Arboretum, commonly known as Gwangneung Arboretum, is located in the village of Jikdong-ril, Soheul-eup. It is the biggest arboretum in South Korea. It is also known to be a home to white bellied black woodpeckers. The arboretum also houses the Gwangneung Forest Museum and Gwangneung Forest Beach.

As of 2003, the city reported that it had not only one Treasure and a Historical Site designated by the state government, but also 15 properties designated to be as such by Gyeonggi province including four tangible and one intangible cultural properties, two cultural documents, and 8 surveyors.

Gallery Sansawon is a traditional Korean brewery. It houses more than 1,000 historical documents and Korean alcohol-related items, with free samples of 10 different kinds of traditional alcoholic drinks and food items, such as alcohol bread and crackers to Yakgwa and yeot.

=== Festivals ===
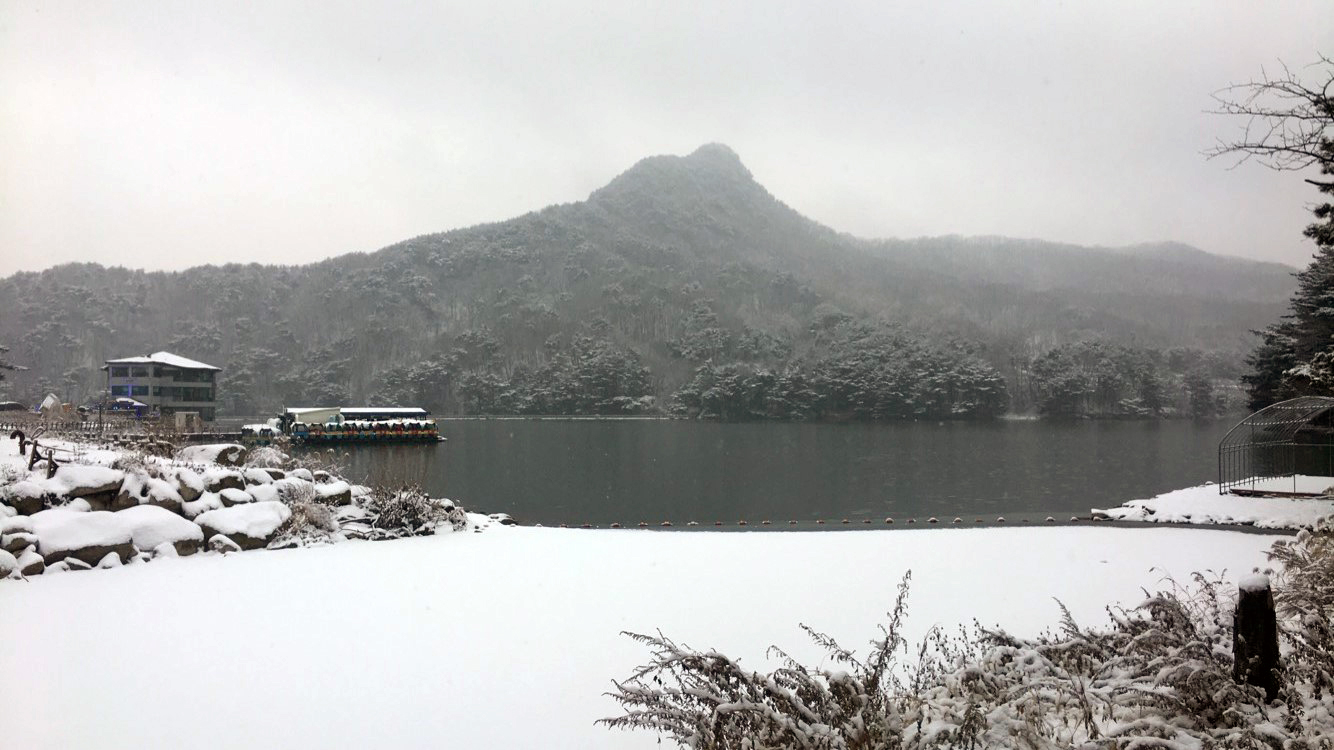
Sanjeong Lake

Pocheon annually hosts the Gakhol Cultural Festival, Banwol Cultural Festival, Sanjeong Lake, and Myeongseong Mountain Festival. The Sanjeong Lake Festival, held every October since 1997, is a representative cultural festival of Pocheon in regards to nature, involving Sanjeong Lake and Myeongseong Mountain. It hosts an amateur photography competition and offers various traditional performances and local special foods and drinks.

The Herb Island Lighting & Illumination Festival is also held annually. Lovely, colorful lights create romantic spaces, and the fantastic appearance of the white-colored buildings create the illusion of being in a foreign country. There are a variety of aroma stores, hub museums, and herb cafes. The festival offers various events about Christmas. It reminds tourists of the Christmas in Europe.

== Twin towns – sister cities ==
Pocheon is twinned with:

- Nowon District, Seoul
- Hokuto, Yamanashi, Japan (2003)

== Notable residents ==
- Baekhyun – singer, dancer, model, actor and member of (EXO, EXO-CBX)
- Mo Tae-bum, winner of the 500 m speed skating event at the 2010 Winter Olympics, and silver medalist in the 1000 m event.
- Lim Young-woong, trot singer, and final winner of the reality television show Mr Trot.

== See also ==
- List of cities in South Korea
