= Russell L. Blaisdell =

American minister and US Air Force Chaplain colonel (1910-2007)

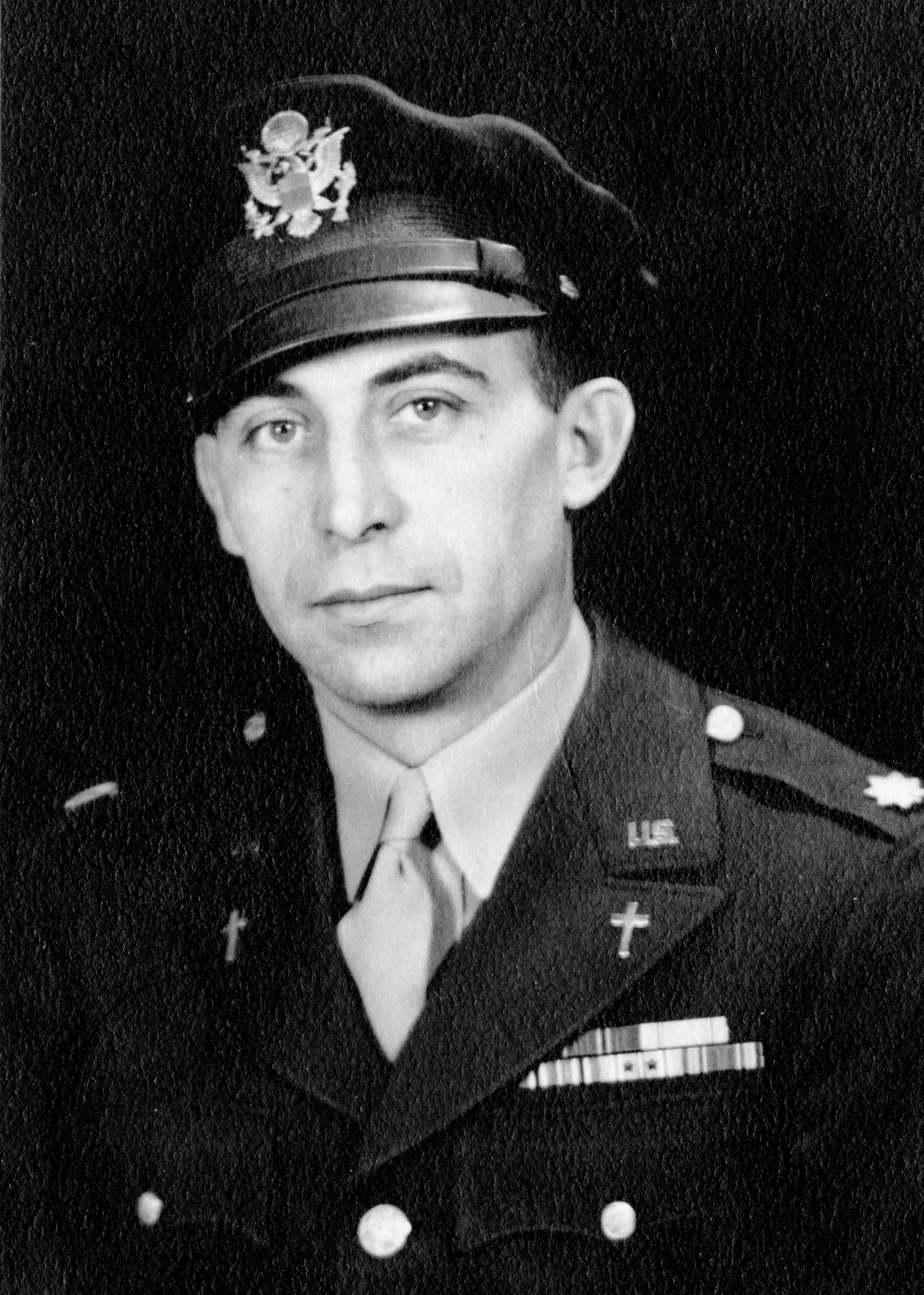
- Born: September 4, 1910; Hayfield, Minnesota, U.S.
- Died: May 1, 2007 (aged 96); Las Vegas, Nevada, U.S.
- Burial place: South Nevada Veterans Memorial Cemetery
- Relatives: Major General Franklin J. Blaisdell (son)
- Military career
- Allegiance: United States
- Branch: United States Air Force
- Service years: 1938–1964
- Conflicts: World War II; Korean War

Russell L. Blaisdell (September 4, 1910 – May 1, 2007) was an American minister and United States Air Force Chaplain colonel who organised the so-called "Kiddy Car Airlift," the rescue of 964 orphans and 80 orphanage staff from Seoul in the face of the Chinese advance during the Korean War on December 20, 1950.

== Education ==
He graduated from Hayfield High School, Hayfield, Minnesota in 1927 and received his BA from Macalester College in 1934 and his Master's of Divinity from McCormick Theological Seminary in 1937.

== USAF career ==
Blaisdell joined the United States Army Air Corps in July 1940 and was stationed at Fort Sheridan, Illinois until October 1940. He later served at Fort George Wright from 1940–42. He served as chaplain and base chaplain at Edmonton Alberta for units building the Alaska Highway from 1942–4 and from 1944–6 at Pacific Wing ATC, Hickam Field from where he visited USAAF units in the Pacific Theater of Operations. Following World War II, in 1946 he was stationed at Scott Air Force Base and then at HQ Eighth Air Force, Carswell Air Force Base until 1950. With the outbreak of the Korean War he was assigned to HQ Fifth Air Force, Korea from July 1950 to May 1951.

Following the Inchon Landing and the recapture of Seoul in September 1950 then Lieutenant Colonel Blaisdell and another chaplain, Colonel Wallace I. Wolverton began attending to war orphans in the Seoul area. Initially the orphans were placed in a Seoul orphanage, but as the number of orphans continued to increase, the two together with Blaisdell's chaplain's assistant Staff Sergeant Merle "Mike" Y. Strang and Korean social workers established the Orphans Processing Center, eventually providing food and shelter for over 1000 orphans. After Wolverton left South Korea, Blaisdell continued to manage the center.

=== Operation Kiddy Car ===
In December 1950 as the Chinese People's Volunteer Army and North Korean forces threatened Seoul with their Second Phase Campaign, UN forces, including the Fifth Air Force, began to evacuate the city and move further south. On 19 December, Lieutenant Colonel Blaisdell and Staff Sergeant Strang drove the orphans to Inchon harbor for evacuation by Navy LST to Jeju Island, but the vessels failed to arrive. Blaisdell then approached Colonel T.C. Rogers, the 5th Air Force Director of Operations, who arranged for transport aircraft to evacuate the orphans from Kimpo Air Base the following morning. Blaisdell then commandeered a company of Marine Corps trucks to transport the children and their Korean caregivers to Kimpo. Despite arriving at Kimpo more than two hours late, the orphans were evacuated to safety on Jeju Island aboard 16 C-54 Skymaster aircraft. An orphanage was established on Jeju and run by Whang On-soon until the end of the Korean War, when it was relocated back to Seoul.

The events surrounding the airlift became widely known outside Korea only when Dean Hess published his autobiography, Battle Hymn, in 1956, which later served as the basis for the 1957 film of the same name, where Hess was played by Rock Hudson. Staff Sergeant Strang later wrote and asked Blaisdell's advice on whether he should "blow the whistle" on Hess's limited role in the evacuation; Blaisdell responded, "The goal of our efforts, in regard to the orphans ... was the saving of lives, which would otherwise have been lost. That was accomplished. In a sense, Mike, well-doing has its own reward, which is not measured in dollars, prestige, or goodwill..." In 2004, Dr. George F. Drake took issue with Dean Hess's portrayal of the Kiddy Car Airlift, claiming that Hess took more credit than he deserved. Drake gave Blaisdell and Strang the credit for the evacuation, with Hess's role being reduced to providing accommodation on Jeju itself. According to this criticism, Blaisdell was reportedly originally credited with the evacuation by the media until Battle Hymn was published. Drake termed Hess' claims as "fraudulent", but acknowledged that the proceeds from Battle Hymn and royalties from the movie were donated to aid Korean orphans.

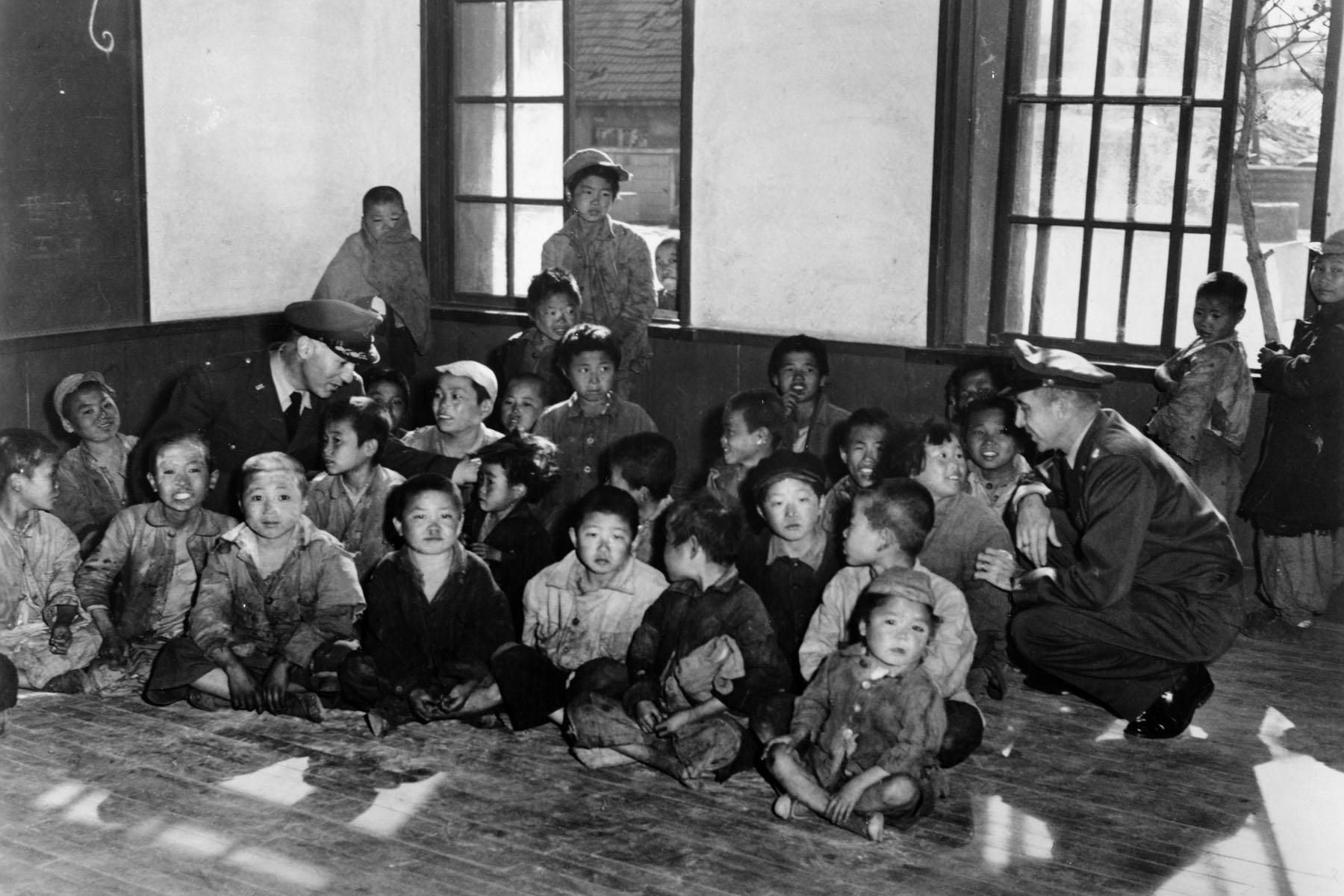
New arrivals at the 5th Air Force's Seoul processing center for orphans, before the evacuation to Jeju Island. Chaplain COL Wallace Wolverton is at left and Chaplain LTC Russell Blaisdell is at right

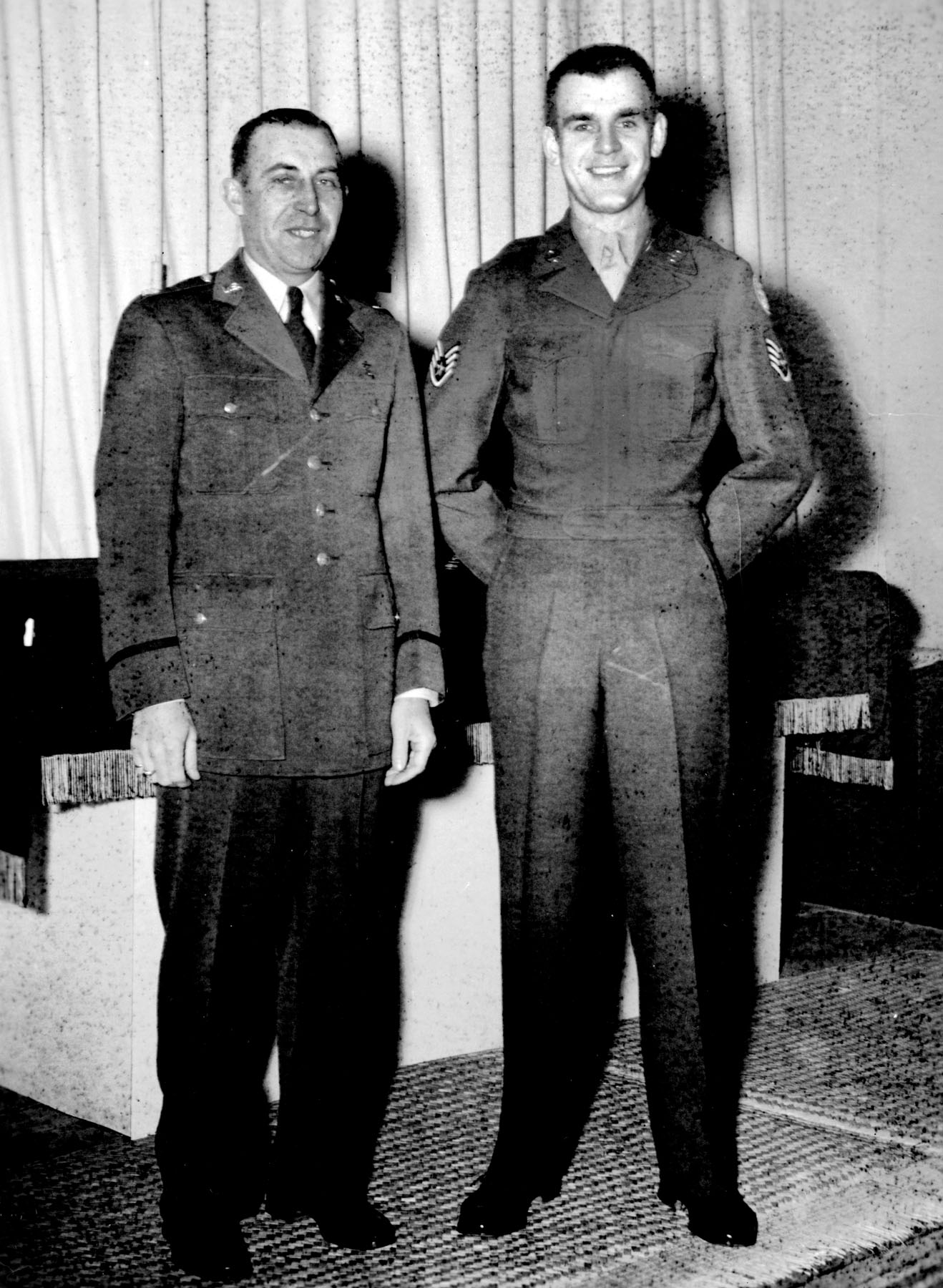
LTC Blaisdell and SSGT Mike Strang

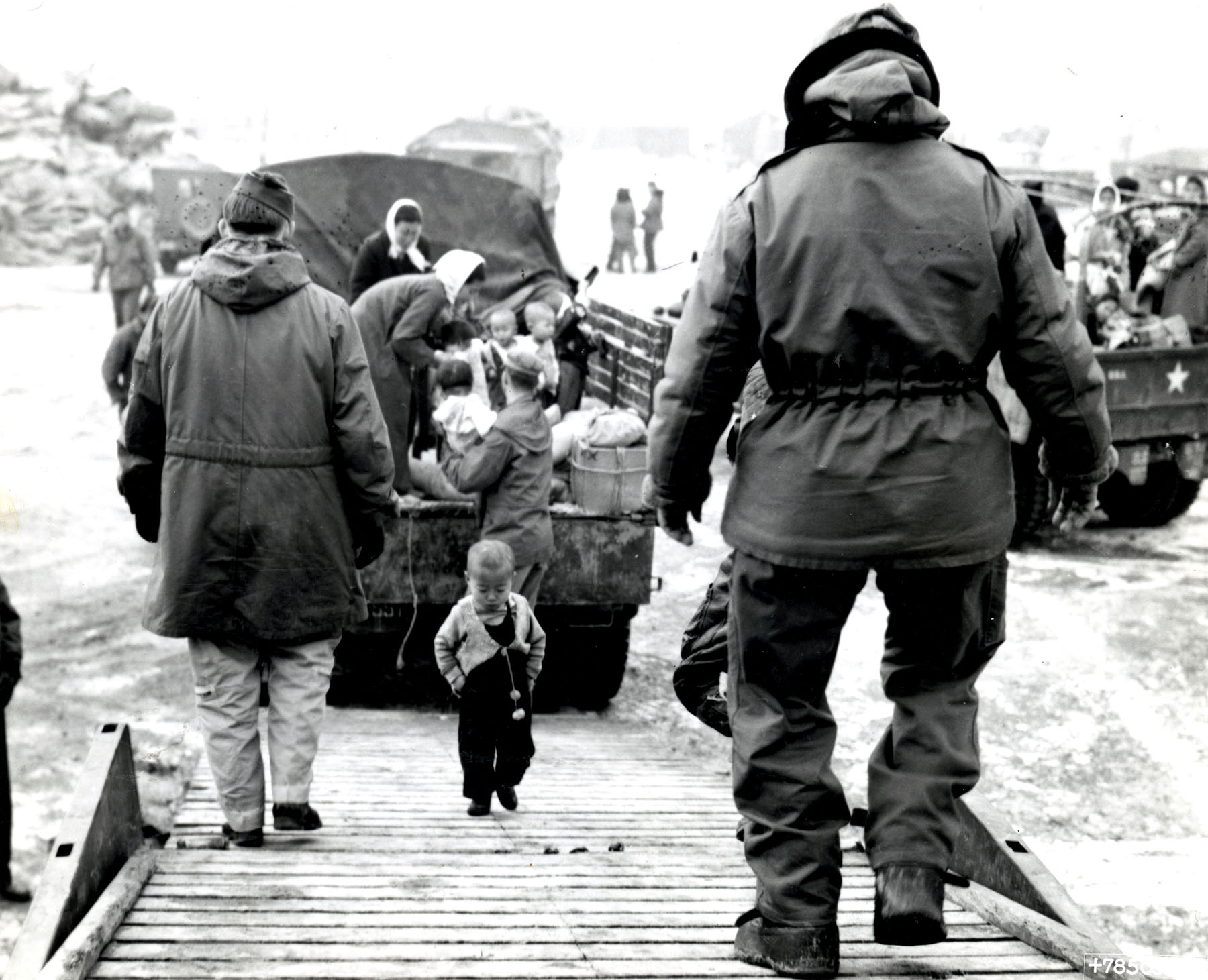
A Korean toddler climbs the boarding ramp onto a C-54 at Kimpo

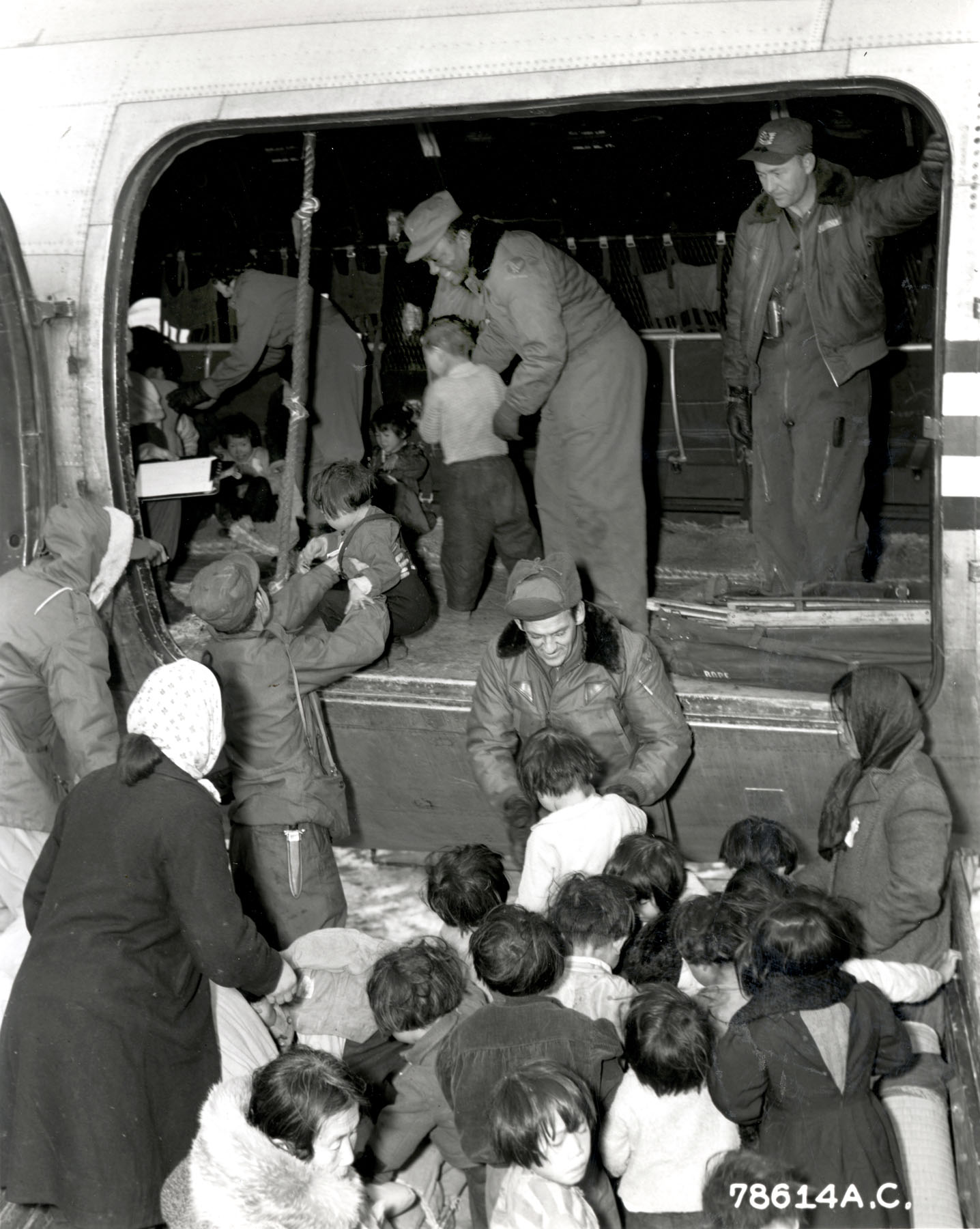
Orphans being loaded onto a C-54

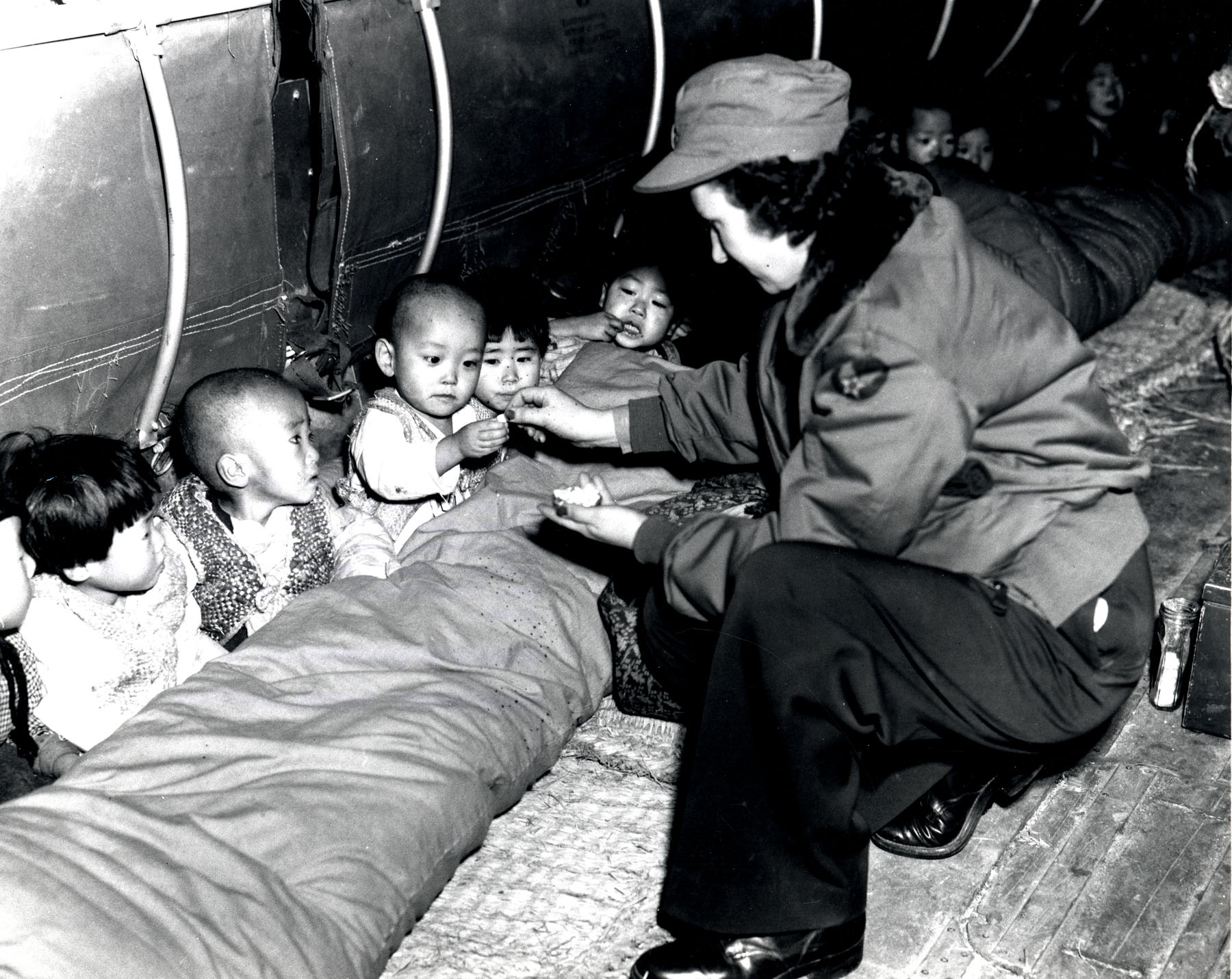
Orphans receive candy from Flight Nurse Capt. Mary Spivak

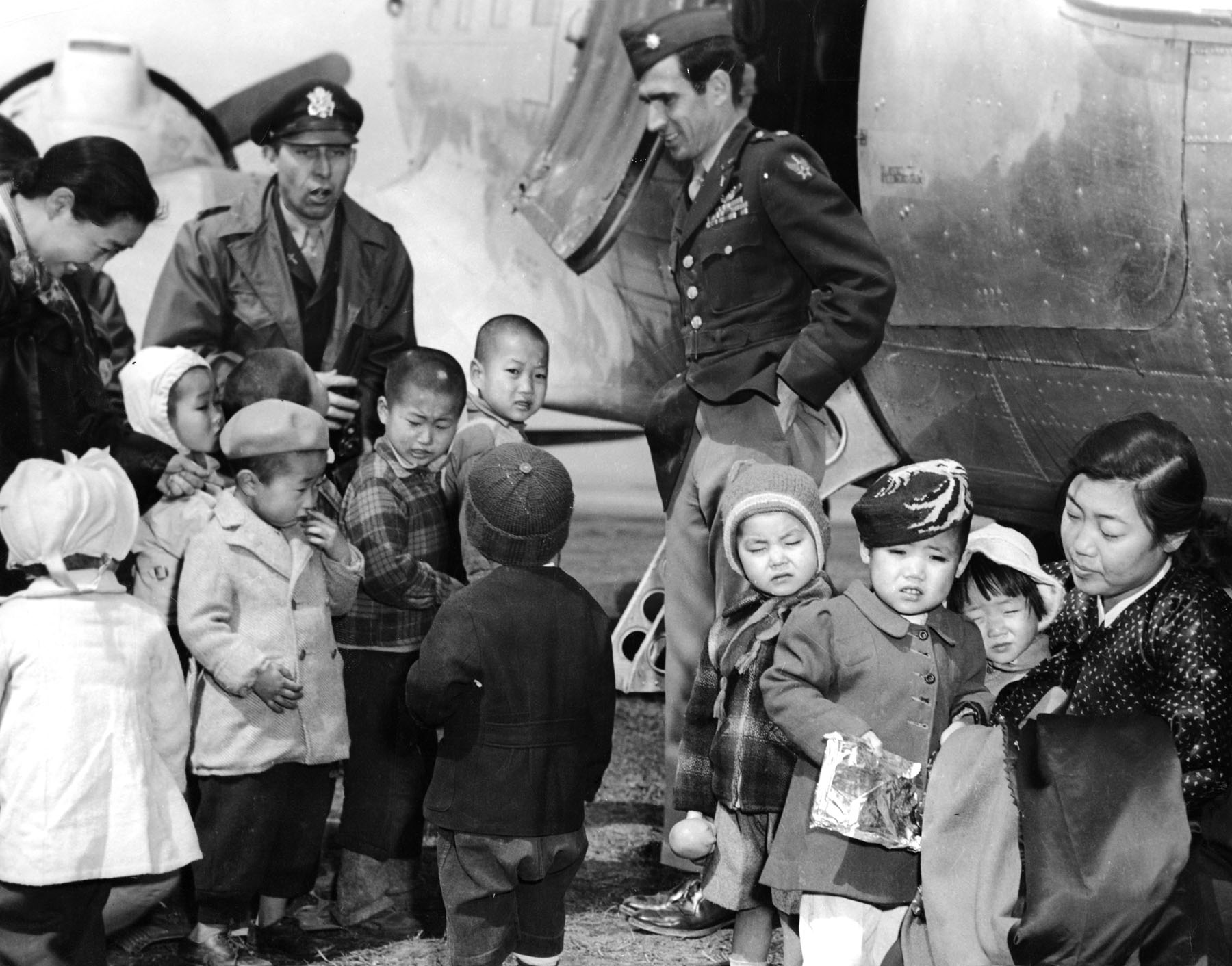
LTC Blaisdell and COL Hess visit orphans on Jeju

=== Post-Korean War ===
Following the Korean War, Lieutenant Colonel Blaisdell served as chaplain at: HQ Japan Air Self Defence Force, Nagoya, Japan, from 1951–3; HQ Flying Training Wing, Waco, Texas from 1953–7, where he was promoted to colonel; and the Seventeenth Air Force, Wheelus Air Base, Libya from 1957-60. He then served as Command Chaplain at Tactical Air Command, Langley Air Force Base from 1960-2 and HQ, Military Airlift Command, Scott Air Force Base from 1962–4.

Colonel Blaisdell retired from the USAF on 30 June 1964.

== Later life ==
He served as representative of the New York State Department of Social Services from 1966 to 1977. He retired to Fayetteville, New York, wintering in Las Vegas, Nevada, where he died on May 1, 2007. He is buried at the Veterans Cemetery, Boulder City, Nevada.

== Awards and honors ==
Blaisdell returned to South Korea in 2001, where he was greeted by Lee Hee-ho, the First Lady of South Korea, awarded an honorary Doctorate of Social Welfare by Kyung Hee University and referred to in the Korean media as the "Schindler" of Korea. He was also reunited with Whang On-soon, then aged 102, whose family continues to operate the Seoul Orphanage.

SSGT Mike Strang died in 1998 without ever receiving any official recognition for his role in saving the orphans, but he was posthumously awarded the Bronze Star in 2003.

== Memorial ==
In December 2009, Statue was unveiled in Nam District, Gwangju.

== See also ==
- Operation Babylift, a similar evacuation of orphans during the Fall of Saigon in 1975
