= Daegu International Airport =

Airport serving Daegu, South Korea

Daegu International Airport 대구국제공항
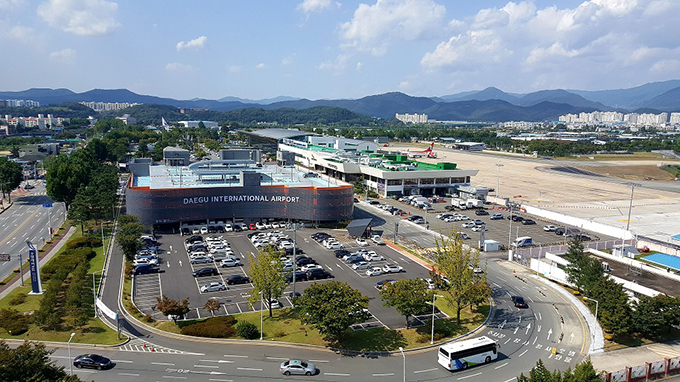
- IATA: TAE; ICAO: RKTN

Summary
- Airport type: Public / Military
- Owner: Ministry of Land, Infrastructure and Transport
- Operator: Korea Airports Corporation; Republic of Korea Air Force
- Serves: Daegu and North Gyeongsang
- Location: Dong District, Daegu, South Korea
- Opened: 1 April 1961; 65 years ago
- Hub for: T'way Air
- Built: 31 January 1937; 89 years ago
- Elevation AMSL: 116 ft (35 m)
- Coordinates: 35°53′39″N 128°39′32″E
- Website: airport.co.kr/daegueng

Map
- Location of airport in South Korea

Runways
Direction	Length		Surface
Direction	m	ft	Surface
13L/31R	2,743	8,999	Concrete
13R/31L	2,755	9,039	Asphalt concrete

Statistics (2019)
- Passengers: 4,669,057
- Aircraft movements: 31,236
- Tonnes of cargo: 34,718
- Statistics from KAC

- Daegu International Airport
- Hangul: 대구국제공항
- Hanja: 大邱國際空港
- RR: Daegu gukjegonghang
- MR: Taegu kukchegonghang

Daegu International Airport (IATA: TAE, ICAO: RKTN) is an international airport serving the city of Daegu and the surrounding area in southeastern South Korea. The airport is also a military base for the ROKAF's 11th Fighter Wing, whose three squadrons fly the F-15K.

== Overview ==
The airport chiefly serves domestic routes with a small number of international flights. Despite the growth of the nearby city of Daegu, passenger numbers at Daegu International Airport have been steadily declining since 2004, the year when KTX highspeed rail reached the city. The 2013 number of about 1.1 million passengers is around half of pre-2003 figures. Since 2014, passenger numbers have increased sharply due to the expansion of low-cost carriers. Because Daegu Airport is shared with the military, taking photographs or video of the apron, the runway or the military facility is strictly prohibited.

== History ==
Daegu International Airport was originally established under Japanese rule as Taegu Airfield on 31 January 1937.

=== Korean War ===
At the outbreak of the Korean War, the airfield consisted of a dirt and gravel runway and two concrete buildings. The airfield was designated by the USAF as K-2.

The airfield was used as part of the Bout One project, an emergency program to train Republic of Korea Air Force pilots to fly the P-51 Mustang. The Bout One planes provided close air support to the U.S. 24th Infantry Division through July 1950. On 10 July 1950, the Bout One force was re-designated as the 51st Fighter Squadron, and was merged into the 12th Fighter-Bomber Squadron on 4 August.

The existing dirt and gravel runway was improved by the 822nd Engineer Aviation Battalion beginning on 18 July, and the Battalion subsequently began preparations for a parallel 5,000 foot (1,500 m) PSP (perforated steel planks) runway on 7 August.

USAF units based at Taegu from July–August 1950 included:

- 18th Fighter-Bomber Group, from July–August 1950, subordinate units included:
  - 12th Fighter-Bomber Squadron operating F-51 from 15 July 1950
- 51st Fighter Squadron (Provisional) from 10 July–August 4, 1950
- 6002nd Air Base Squadron from July–8 August 1950
- 6147th Tactical Control Squadron (Airborne) operating T-6 Mosquitos from 1 August–September 6, 1950
- 6149th Air Base Unit from August 1950

Taegu Airfield was abandoned following the North Korean attack on Taegu in mid-August 1950, but USAF units began reoccupying the base by 23 September 1950. The 822nd Battalion had returned to Taegu on 17 September and soon resurfaced the original dirt and gravel runway with PSP and extended its length to 5,700 feet (1,700 m).

USAF units based at Taegu from September 1950 included:

- 49th Fighter-Bomber Group operating F-80s from 1 October 1950. This was the first jet unit to be based in Korea. Subordinate units included:
  - 7th Fighter-Bomber Squadron from 28 September
  - 8th Fighter-Bomber Squadron from 29 September
  - 9th Fighter-Bomber Squadron from 29 September
- 543rd Tactical Support Group from 26 September, subordinate units included:
  - 8th Tactical Reconnaissance Squadron, Photo-Jet operating RF-80s from 2 October
  - 162nd Tactical Reconnaissance Squadron, Night Photo from 8 October
  - 363rd Reconnaissance Technical Squadron from 4 October

In May 1951, the 930th Engineer Aviation Group began repair work on the PSP runway and commenced construction of a 9,000 feet (2,700 m) concrete runway.

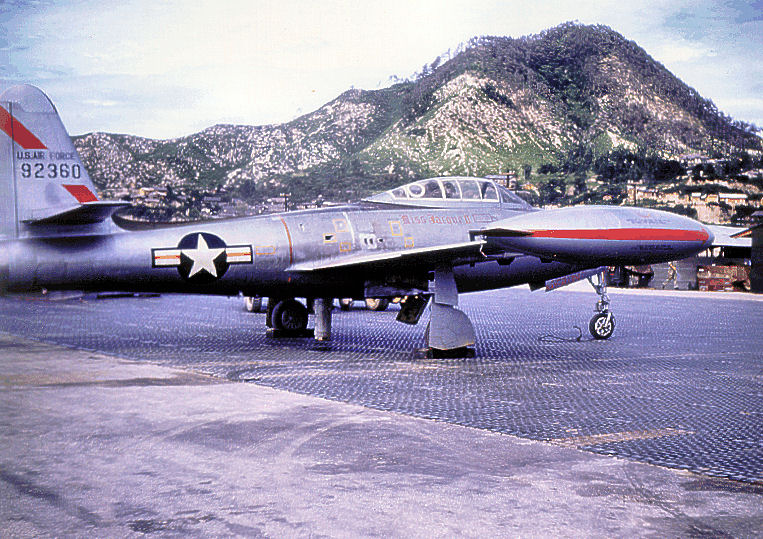
F-84E of the 27th Fighter Escort Group in 1951

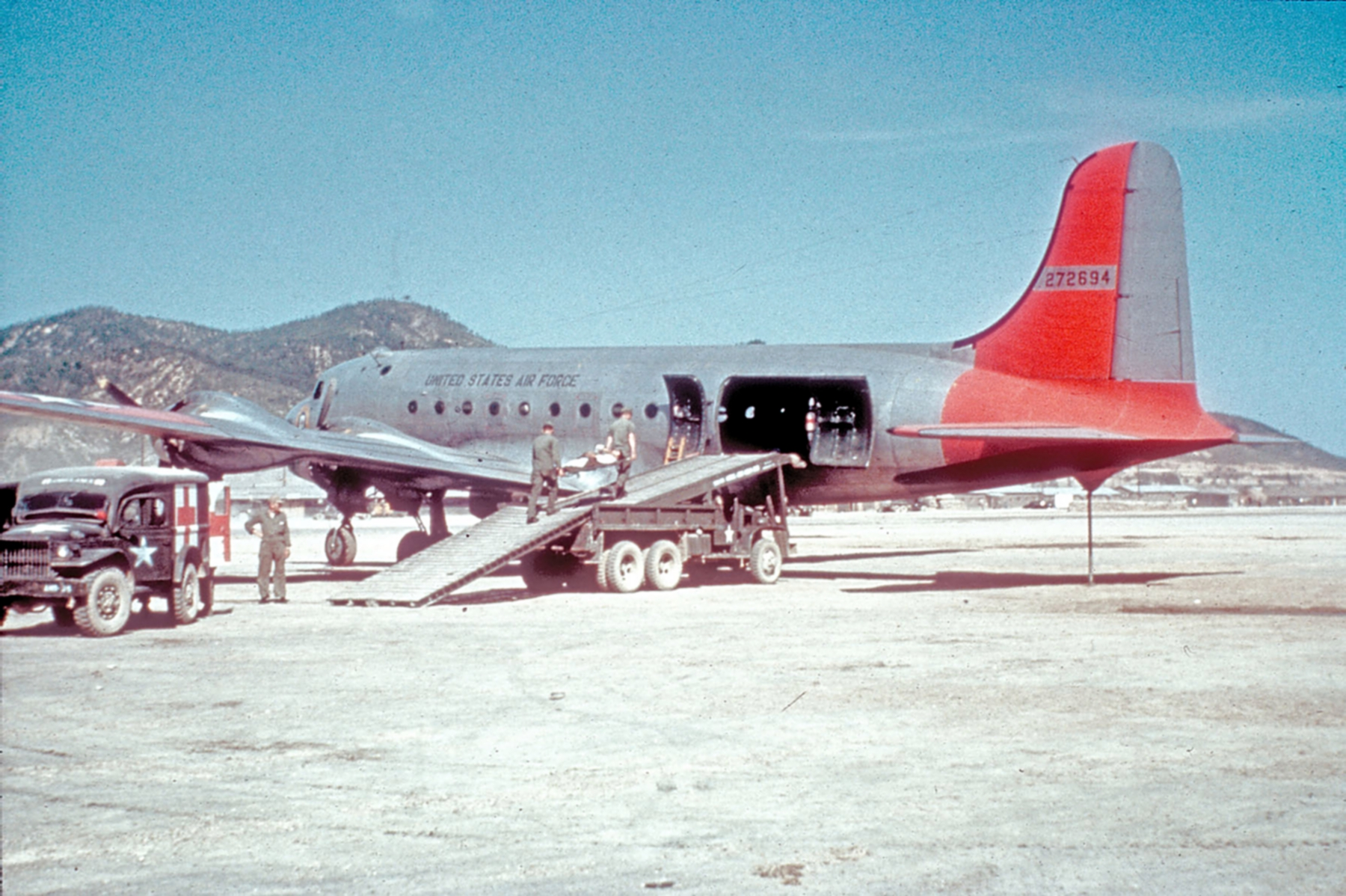
Casualties being loaded onto a C-54 in 1951

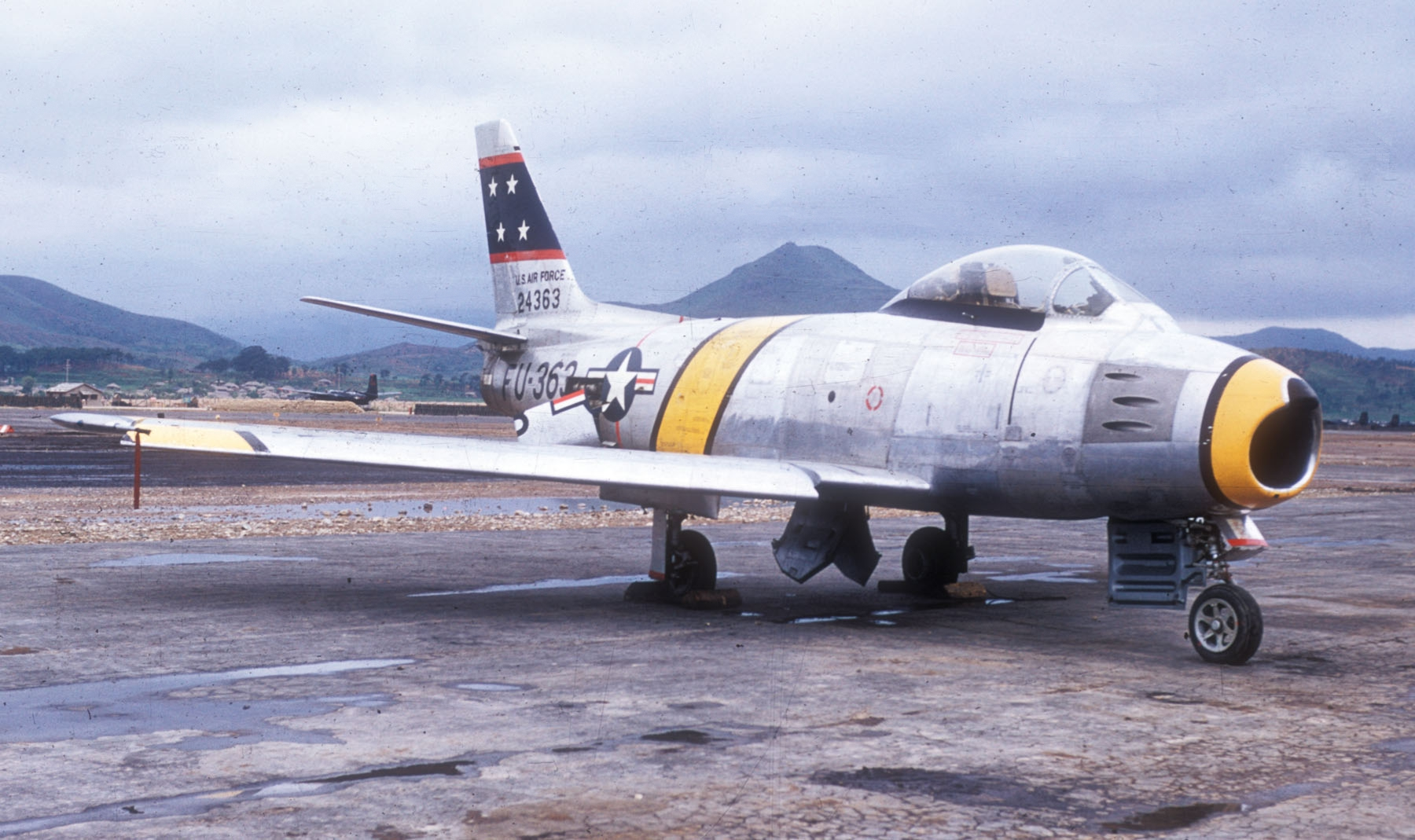
An F-86F of the 12th Fighter-Bomber Squadron at Taegu in 1952

=== Postwar ===
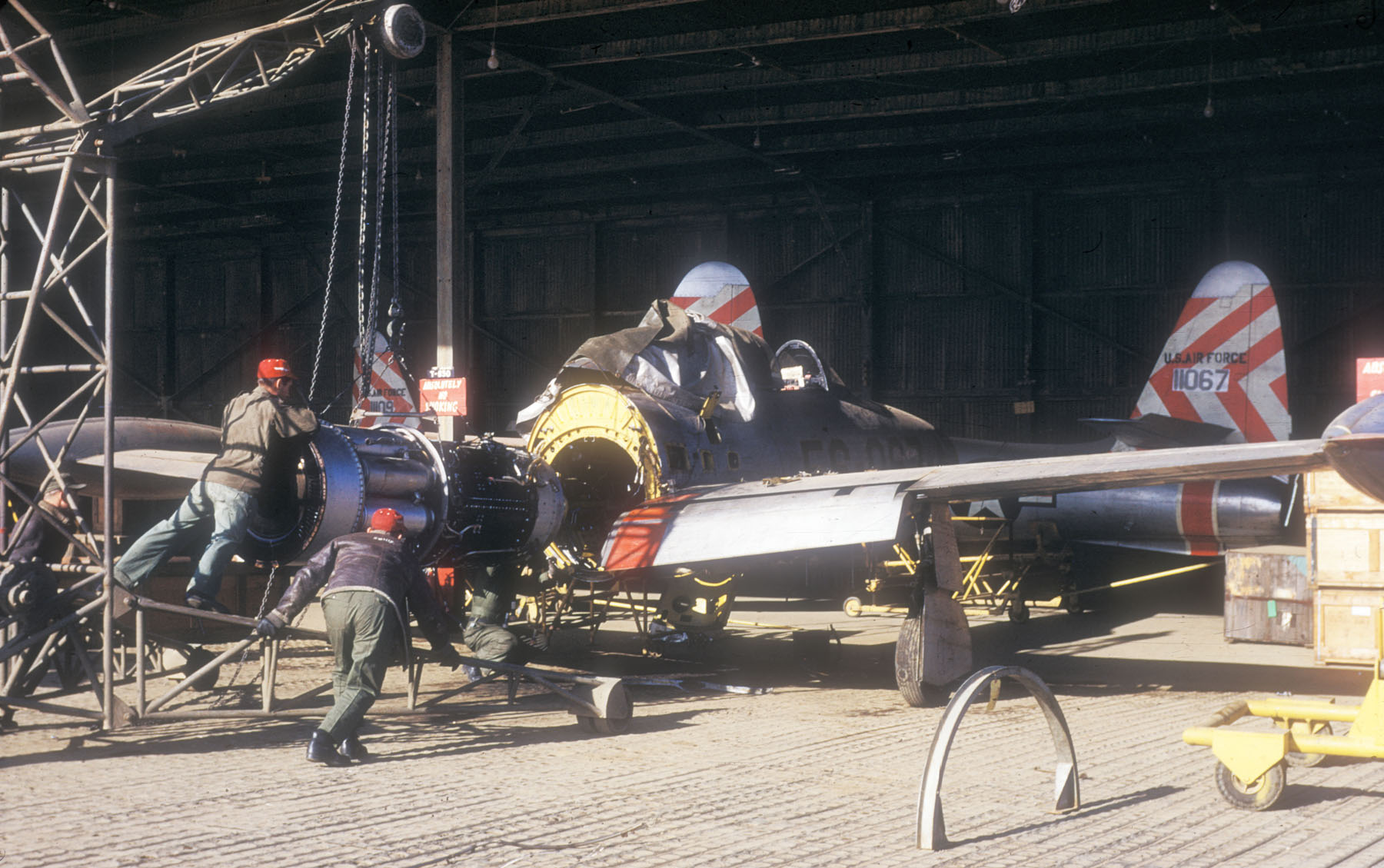
F-84 engine maintenance in 1954

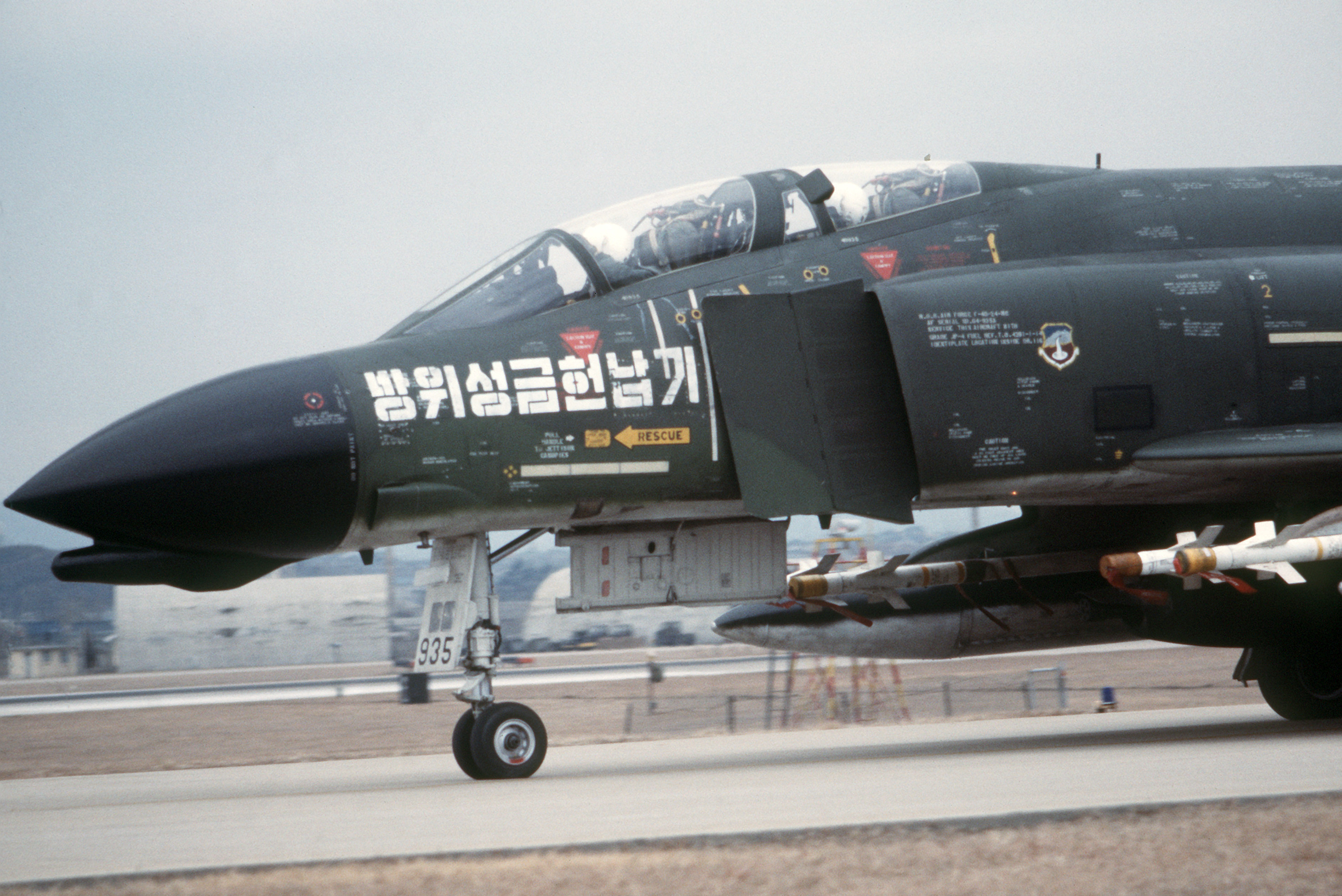
ROKAF F-4D in 1979

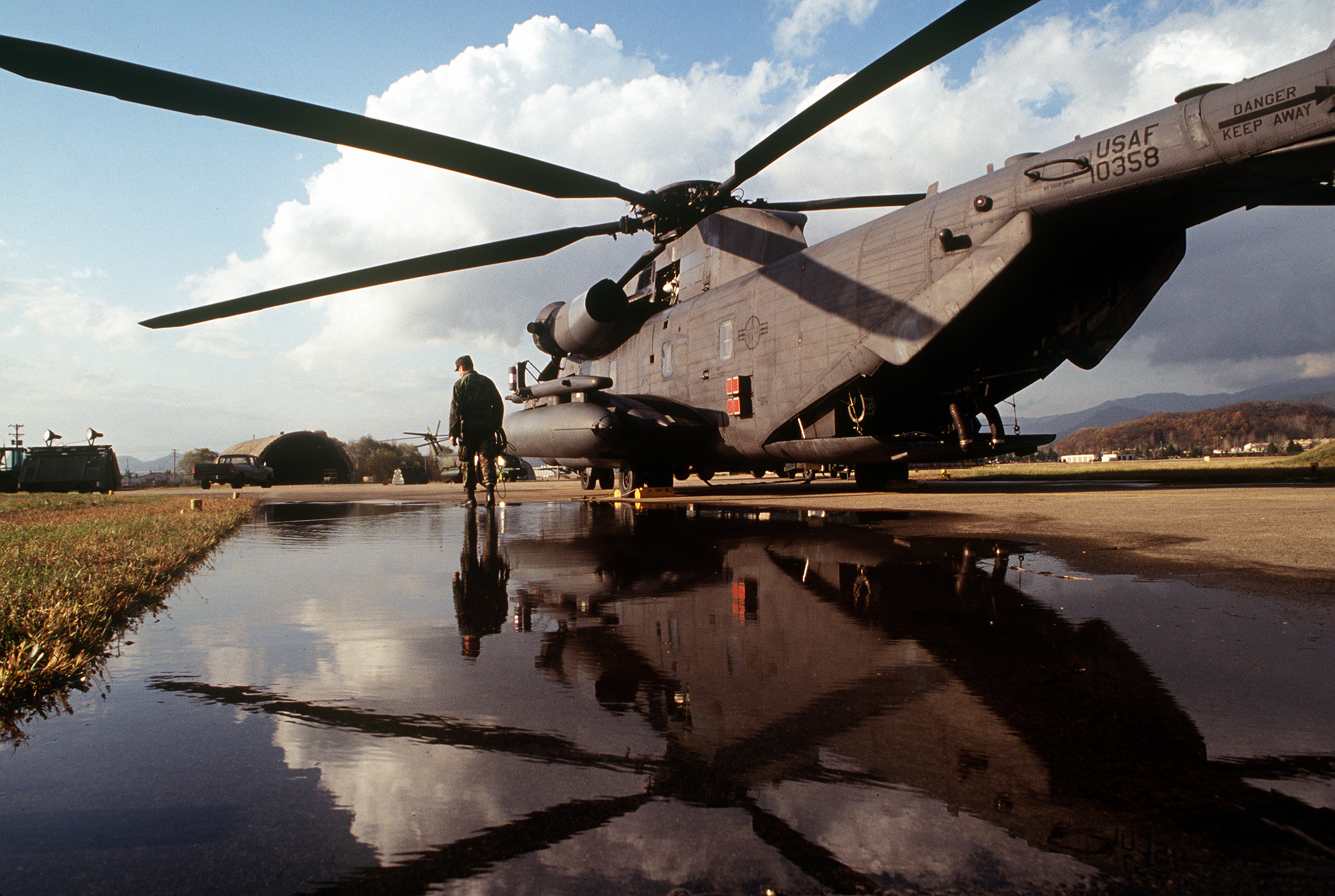
MH-53J at Taegu in 1993

== Terminal ==
Daegu Airport consists of 2 separate terminals: Domestic Terminal and International Terminal. The relatively small passenger terminal (International Terminal) boasts a comfortable environment through its adoption of traditional design elements symbolizing Ouga (The song of five friends: water, rock, pine, bamboo, and moon; by Yun Son-Do), and its crane-like structure. The parking lot can accommodate about 1,097 cars and has a fully automated parking system; it is open from 6 am to 10 pm.

== Airlines and destinations ==
Airlines	Destinations
Asiana Airlines	Jeju
China Eastern Airlines	Shanghai–Pudong
China United Airlines	Seasonal: Ordos
HK Express	Hong Kong
Jeju Air	Cebu, Jeju
Jin Air	Jeju
Korean Air	Jeju, Seoul–Incheon^{1}
Loong Air	Zhangjiajie
Lucky Air	Charter: Kunming
Qingdao Airlines	Qingdao
Sichuan Airlines	Zhangjiajie
Trinity Airways	Bangkok–Suvarnabhumi, Da Nang, Fukuoka, Guam, Jeju, Nha Trang, Osaka–Kansai, Taipei–Taoyuan, Tokyo–Narita, Yanji; Seasonal: Ulaanbaatar, Zhangjiajie
VietJet Air	Nha Trang

^1Korean Air's service between Daegu and Incheon is available only to passengers flying internationally to/from South Korea with Korean Air

== Statistics ==
=== Traffic by calendar year ===
Traffic by calendar year
	Passenger volume	Aircraft operations	Cargo tonnage
2001	2,214,613	18,511	17,564
2002	2,274,901	19,984	19,825
2003	2,228,550	20,729	20,823
2004	1,567,678	15,021	22,803
2005	1,236,446	11,837	20,565
2006	1,194,150	11,111	19,898
2007	1,177,490	10,997	19,619
2008	1,079,011	9,691	18,247
2009	1,026,203	8,257	17,669
2010	1,148,953	8,287	18,526
2011	1,178,212	8,489	19,724
2012	1,110,290	8,413	18,352
2013	1,084,585	8,794	16,383
2014	1,537,328	11,832	18,808
2015	2,027,626	14,369	20,480
2016	2,533,132	17,089	24,341
2017	3,560,124	23,191	32,031
2018	4,062,833	26,800	33,267
2019	4,669,057	31,236	34,718
2020	1,749,396	12,990	11,050
2021	2,048,365	13,294	10,583
2022	2,255,883	13,472	12,394
2023	3,302,107	20,244	22,077
Source: Korea Airports Corporation Traffic Statistics

== Access ==
The airport is 1.34 km from Ayanggyo Station (Daegu Subway Line 1) and can be reached by bus or taxi.

== Accidents and incidents ==
- On 13 June 1991, Korean Air Flight 376 (HL7350), a Boeing 727 operating a domestic flight from Jeju to Daegu, performed an unexpected gear-up landing at Daegu. The crew failed to read out the landing procedure checklist and therefore did not select the gear down option. Subsequent investigation revealed that the pilot instructed the co-pilot to pull the fuse case from the warning system because the repeated warnings that the landing gear was not deployed were "irritating and distracting". With the warning horn disabled, the South Korean pilot brought the plane in and slid down the length of the runway on the central structural rib in the belly of the aircraft. There were no serious injuries but the aircraft was written off. The police applied for an arrest warrant for the captain and the -captain, but controversy arose as the prosecutor rejected the application and investigated it without physical detention, but Joo Ho-young, a judge who later became a member of the National Assembly, said in a trial ruling held in January of the following year, "The heavy responsibility of punishment under the criminal law is inevitable that defendants who are tasked with safe transportation of passengers did not follow basic air operation rules and caused an accident that could kill all 120 passengers." Captain Lee In-sung was sentenced to October in prison, and First Officer Kim Sung-joong and Flight Engineer Park Il-sung were sentenced to August in prison, and they were arrested in court. The gear-up landing blew up the lower part of the aircraft, ultimately rendering it inoperable, and on July 27, 1992, Korean Air donated the aircraft for practical use to Inha Technical University, a member of the same Hanjin Group, after disassembling the remaining aircraft at Daegu International Airport in August 1991. After the farewell event on June 16, 2023, another aircraft was replaced and after the dismantling, the HL7350 head went to KidZania Hanoi in Westlake Hanoi, Lotte Mall, Hanoi, Vietnam, to be painted with Vietnam Airlines as a decoration.
- On 26 May 2023, a male passenger opened an emergency exit as Asiana Airlines Flight 8124, an Airbus A321-200 (HL8256) was on approach to Daegu International Airport on a flight from Jeju International Airport, just a few minutes before landing. The emergency slide deployed and was ripped off. The aircraft landed safely, but at least six people were injured and taken to hospital. The man was arrested by authorities

== See also ==
- Transportation in South Korea
