= Bout One =

Military operation

The Bout One Project was an operation undertaken during the Korean War by the U.S. Air Force to train South Korean pilots to fly F-51 Mustang fighters.

On June 27, 1950, as part of the project, a special unit was formed in Japan under Major Dean Hess, with the objective of training selected South Korean pilots to fly the F-51. Some of the Korean pilots were veterans of the Japanese Army and Naval air forces during World War II. On July 2, the unit was transferred to Daegu Air Base, South Korea. After transfer, the unit was redesignated as 51st Provisional Fighter Squadron of the Republic of Korea Air Force, but remained under U.S. Air Force command, as the Koreans were not deemed prepared to operate their new aircraft effectively. Nevertheless, given the desperate situation on the ground, the 51st Squadron was committed to combat a day after their arrival, to support the U.S. 24th Infantry Division fighting near Daejon.

The combat operations revealed a number of problems. Major Hess felt that, although enthusiastic, South Korean pilots were not ready to operate F-51's effectively. Within two weeks' operation, two fighters were lost to ground fire. Because most Korean pilots did not speak English, there were problems in coordinating air operations with U.S. Army and Air Force. At the same time, because most South Korean Army officers did not speak English, they had difficulty requesting air support from U.S. Air Force as well, underlining the need for South Korean aircraft to support South Korean army units.

In late July, U.S. Air Force decided to disband the 51st Provisional Squadron and transfer its aircraft to U.S. Air Force units to be flown by American pilots. This plan was met by loud protest both from the South Korean government and Major Hess and was subsequently rescinded. However, most U.S. personnel were transferred from the 51st to U.S. units, leaving only two pilots (including Major Hess) and 13 ground crewmen.

After losing two more F-51's, Major Hess decided that Korean pilots required further training. The 51st Squadron was relocated first to Sacheon Air Base, then Chinhae Air Base to continue intensive training while occasionally taking part in combat along the Naktong River, during the Battle of Pusan Perimeter. On December 6, 1950, the 51st Squadron was relocated to Daejon. By this time, the unit was actively participating in support of the United Nations forces who had been driven back south of the 38th Parallel following the intervention by the Chinese forces during the preceding winter.

By this time, Bout One Project was deemed a success and the U.S. Air Force decided to train additional Republic of Korea Air Force pilots and ground crews and deliver more F-51's. On August 1, 1951, Bout One Project was officially terminated as the Republic of Korea Air Force was deemed capable of independent operation. At this time, the survivors of the 51st Provisional Squadron, as well as the additional aircraft provided by the U.S., were combined to form 10th Fighter Wing of Republic of Korea Air Force, under Colonel Kim Young Hwan, one of the original participants in the Bout One Project, at Sacheon Air Base.
