= Franklin J. Blaisdell =

United States Air Force general

- Born: September 15, 1949 (age 77)
- Relatives: COL Russell L. Blaisdell (father)
- Military career
- Allegiance: United States
- Branch: United States Air Force
- Service years: until 2004
- Rank: Major general
- Commands: 564th Strategic Missile Squadron; 90th Operations Group; 30th Space Wing; 21st Space Wing; Commandant of the Armed Forces Staff College

Franklin J. Blaisdell (born September 15, 1949) is a retired major general in the United States Air Force.

== Education ==
He is a graduate of Syracuse University, South Dakota State University, and did his post-graduate studies at John F. Kennedy School of Government, Harvard University.

== Career ==
After joining the Air Force, Blaisdell underwent training for missile operations at Vandenberg Air Force Base. From there, he served with the 44th Strategic Missile Wing before being assigned to the Deputy Chief of Staff for Operations of the Air Force. He later became executive officer of the 15th Air Force before returning to Vandenberg as protocol officer and executive officer of the 1st Strategic Aerospace Division.

In 1984, Blaisdell was named director of military strategic and tactical relay system platform integration, Milstar Special Programs Office at Headquarters Electronic Systems Center. The following year, he was given command of the 564th Strategic Missile Squadron.

In 1988, he was assigned to the Office of the Joint Chiefs of Staff as chief of nuclear operations branch and acting chief of strategic division, Directorate of Operations. He was later transferred to Francis E. Warren Air Force Base and was given command of the 90th Operations Group.

Blaisdell served as inspector general of Headquarters Air Force Space Command from 1993 until 1995, when he was named deputy director of operations, Directorate of Operations. Later that year, he again returned to Vandenberg Air Force Base to command the 30th Space Wing and the Western Range. The following year, he was again assigned to Headquarters Air Force Space Command, this time to assume command of the 21st Space Wing.

After serving as commandant of the Armed Forces Staff College from 1998 to 2000, Blaisdell was assigned to The Pentagon. He first served as director of nuclear and counterproliferation, Deputy Chief of Staff for Air and Space Operations. In 2002, he became director of space operations and integration, Deputy Chief of Staff for Air and Space Operations. He was named director of strategic security, Deputy Chief of Staff for Air and Space Operations in 2004 before retiring later that year.

During his time at The Pentagon, Blaisdell was also selected by Secretary of Defense Donald Rumsfeld and Chairman of the Joint Chiefs of Staff Richard Myers to serve on the Single Integrated Operational Plan Targeting Review Committee. The committee would significantly alter the course of worldwide nuclear targeting requirements.

Awards he received include the Defense Distinguished Service Medal, the Air Force Distinguished Service Medal, the Defense Superior Service Medal, the Legion of Merit with oak leaf cluster, the Meritorious Service Medal with three oak leaf clusters, the Air Force Commendation Medal, the Air Force Achievement Medal, the Combat Readiness Medal and the National Defense Service Medal with service star.
