= Earle E. Partridge =

United States Air Force general

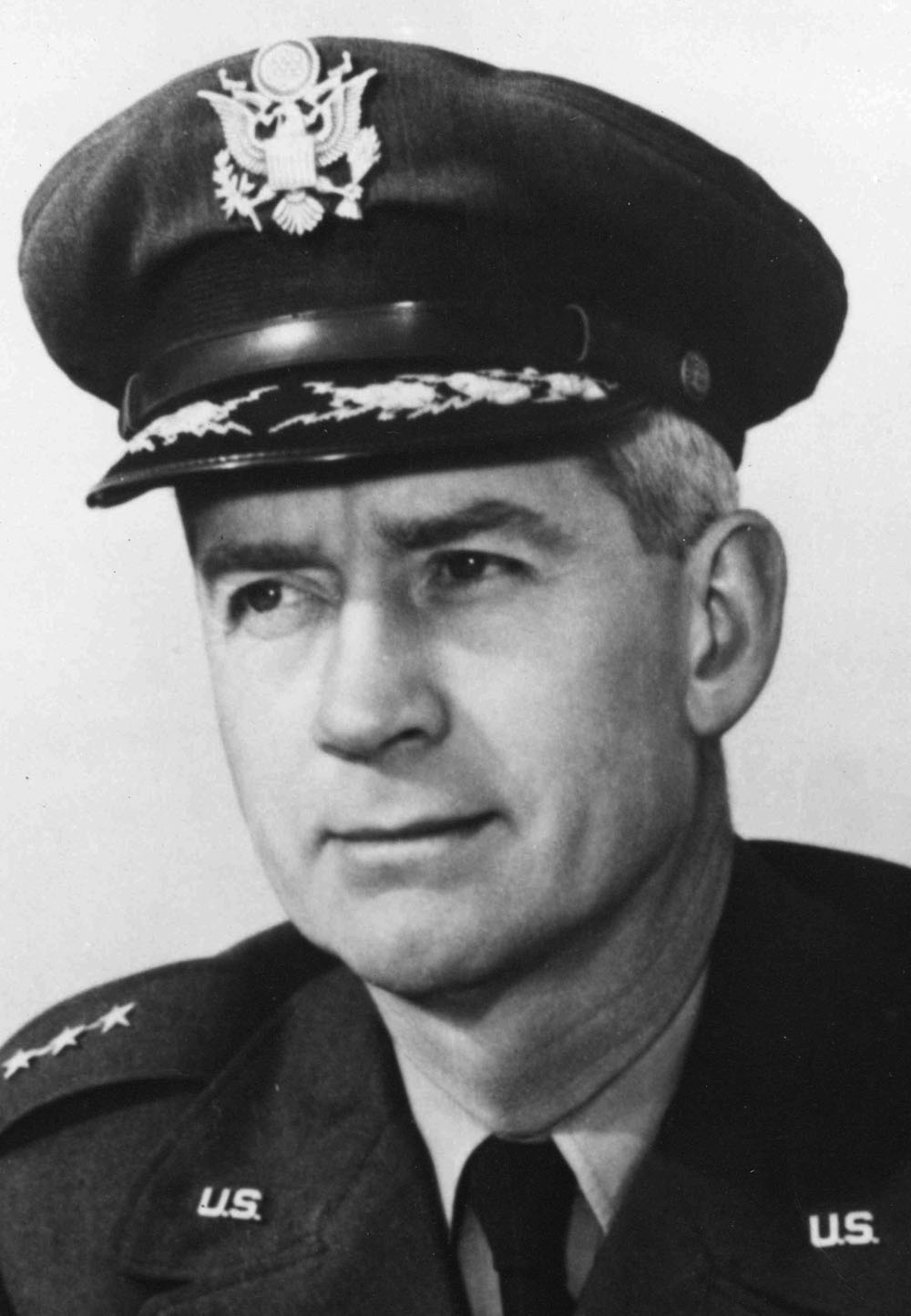
- General Earle Everard Partridge
- Born: July 7, 1900; Winchendon, Massachusetts, US
- Died: September 7, 1990 (aged 90); Jupiter, Florida, US
- Relatives: Wife - Katherine H Partridge Daughter - Patricia E Partridge Daughter - Kay B Partridge
- Military career
- Allegiance: United States of America
- Branch: United States Army; United States Air Force
- Service years: 1918–1919, 1924–1947 (Army); 1947–1959 (Air Force)
- Rank: General
- Commands: North American Air Defense Command; Far East Air Forces; Air Research and Development Command; Fifth Air Force; 3rd Bomb Division
- Conflicts: World War I World War II; Korean War
- Awards: Distinguished Service Cross; Distinguished Service Medal (3); Silver Star; Legion of Merit; Distinguished Flying Cross (3); Bronze Star; Air Medal (11); Belgian Croix de Guerre; Order of the Bath; French Croix de Guerre; French Legion of Honor; Order of Polonia Restituta; Korean Order of Military Merit

Earle Everard "Pat" Partridge (July 7, 1900 – September 7, 1990) was a four-star general in the United States Air Force and a Command Pilot.

== Biography ==
Earl Partridge graduated Ashby High School, Ashby, Massachusetts in 1917. Partridge enlisted in the United States Army in July 1918 at Fort Slocum, New York, and was assigned to the 5th Engineer Training Regiment. He went to France in August 1918 to join the 79th Division, participating in the Battle of Saint-Mihiel and Meuse-Argonne Offensive.

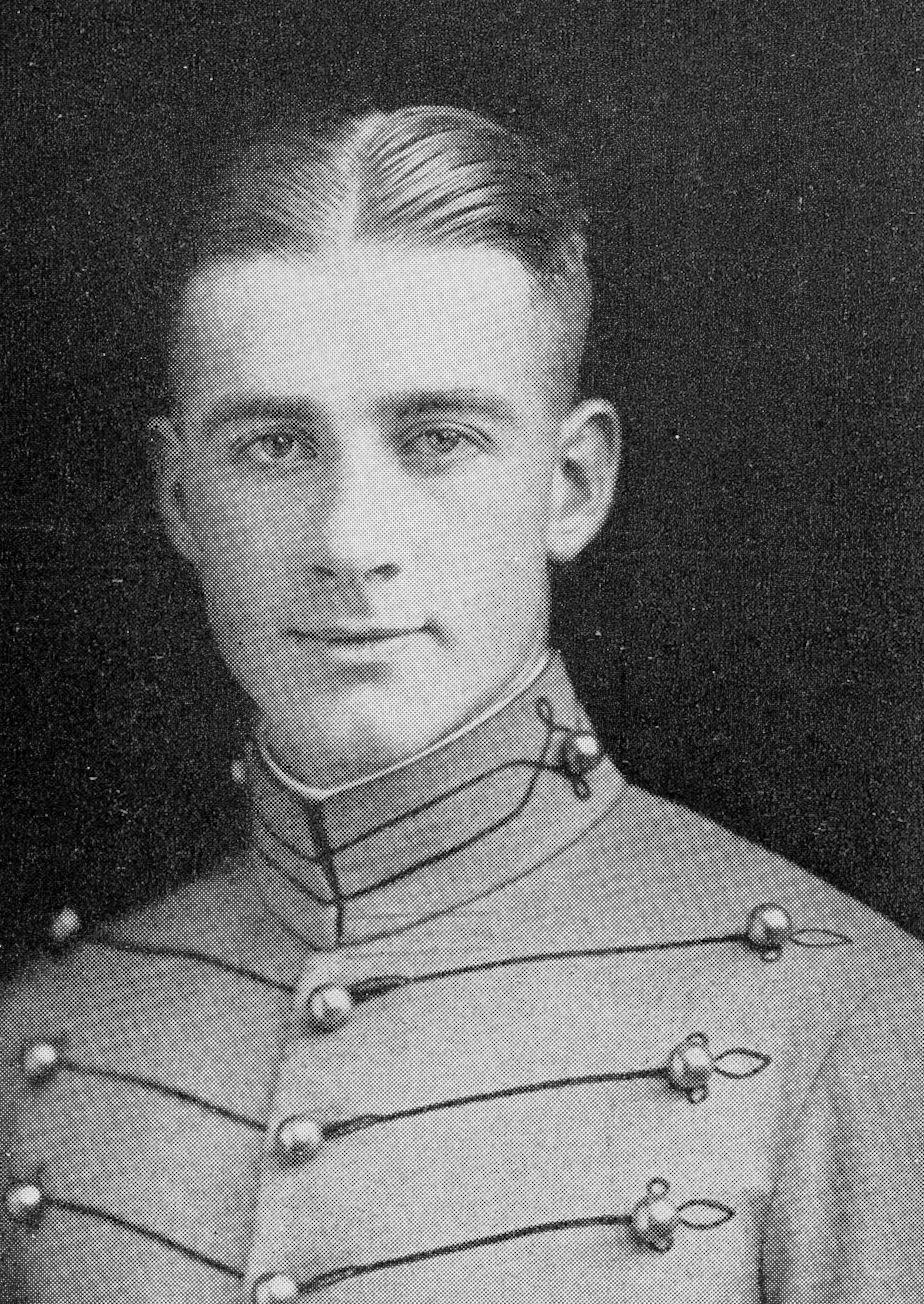
At West Point in 1924

After being released from active duty in June 1919, Partridge studied at Norwich University for one year. He reenlisted in the Army in June 1920, but was sent to study at the United States Military Academy at West Point in August 1920. Partridge graduated sixth in the class of 1924 and was commissioned in the Air Service.

He received flight training at Brooks Field and Kelly Field, and was a stunt pilot in the 1927 silent film Wings.

He taught mathematics at West Point, then went to the Panama Canal Zone with the 6th Composite Group. He was adjutant and assistant operations officer of the 1st Pursuit Group at Selfridge Field, and commanding officer of the 94th Pursuit Squadron.

Partridge graduated from the Air Corps Tactical School in June 1937 and the Command and General Staff School in June 1938. He then returned to the Air Corps Tactical School as an instructor until October 1940.

In 1943, Partridge became chief of staff of the Fifteenth Air Force, and was named deputy commander of the Eighth Air Force in 1944. That June, he became commander of the 3rd Bomb Division, and assisted in its reorganization and movement to Okinawa.

Partridge returned to Headquarters Army Air Forces in January 1946 as assistant chief of staff for operations. He went to Japan in October 1948 as commanding general of the Fifth Air Force, serving through the first year of the Korean War. On his return to the United States in June 1951, he commanded the newly formed Air Research and Development Command at Baltimore, Maryland.

In April 1954, he became commander of the Far East Air Forces at Tokyo. He then became acting Commander of the Air Defense Command from July 20, 1955, to September 17, 1956; he was later named commander in chief of the North American Air Defense Command and the Air Defense Command, at Ent Air Force Base, Colorado Springs.

He gave an introduction to the 1957 Korean War film Battle Hymn starring Rock Hudson.

He retired from active duty on July 31, 1959. He died in Jupiter, Florida on September 7, 1990.

Partridge's awards and decorations include the Distinguished Service Cross, Distinguished Service Medal with two oak leaf clusters, Silver Star, Legion of Merit, Distinguished Flying Cross with two oak leaf clusters, Bronze Star, Air Medal with ten oak leaf clusters, World War I Victory Medal, American Defense Service Medal, World War II Victory Medal, Korean Service Medal, United Nations Korea Medal, Belgian Croix de Guerre with Palm; Companion, British Order of the Bath; French Croix de Guerre with two Palms; Knight, French Legion of Honor; Commander's Cross with Star, Polish Order of Polonia Restituta, and the Korean Order of Military Merit.
