= Dean Hess =

American minister and Air Force officer

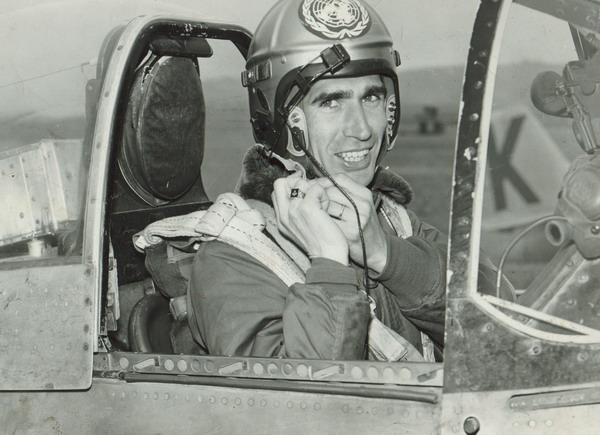
- Lieutenant Colonel Hess in Korea
- Born: Dean Elmer Hess; December 6, 1917; Marietta, Ohio, U.S.
- Died: March 2, 2015 (aged 97); Huber Heights, Ohio, U.S.
- Military career
- Allegiance: United States of America
- Branch: United States Air Force
- Service years: 1941–1969
- Rank: Lieutenant colonel
- Conflicts: World War II; Korean War
- Awards: Silver Star; Order of the White Elephant; Legion of Merit; Air Medal; Eulji Order of Military Merit

Dean Elmer Hess (December 6, 1917 – March 2, 2015) was an American minister and United States Air Force Lieutenant Colonel who was involved in the so-called "Kiddy Car Airlift," the documented rescue of 950 orphans and 80 orphanage staff from the path of the Chinese advance during the Korean War on December 20, 1950. He is the subject of the autobiography Battle Hymn, published in 1956, which later served the basis for the 1957 film of the same name, where he was played by Rock Hudson.

== Biography ==
Hess was born in Marietta, Ohio, in 1917. He attended Marietta College, Ohio, graduating in the class of 1941. Following this, he was ordained as a Pastor in the Disciples of Christ Church at Cleveland, Ohio. Following the December 7, 1941 Attack on Pearl Harbor, Hess enlisted in the United States Army Air Forces. He served as a combat pilot in France after the Normandy landings, and flew a total of 63 combat missions in P-47s.

Despite returning to civilian life, Hess was recalled to active service in July 1948, and was stationed in Japan as part of the American occupation there. In June 1950, he was transferred to Korea at the outbreak of the Korean War as the commander of Bout One Project, the program under which a cadre of USAF instructor pilots trained South Korean pilots in flying the P-51D Mustang. Hess served in Korea until June the following year, at which time he had flown 250 combat missions. Also during his tour, he became involved in charity organizations for orphaned children in the war zone, and his airfield was reportedly full of such children.

=== Kiddy Car Airlift ===
With the airfield over capacity, Hess sent the orphans to an orphanage in Seoul. When the North Korean forces began to capture the city, Hess reportedly organized 15 C-54 Skymaster aircraft to airlift the orphans to safety on Cheju Island. At the time of Hess's departure from South Korea, a new orphanage on this island held over 1,000 Korean children.

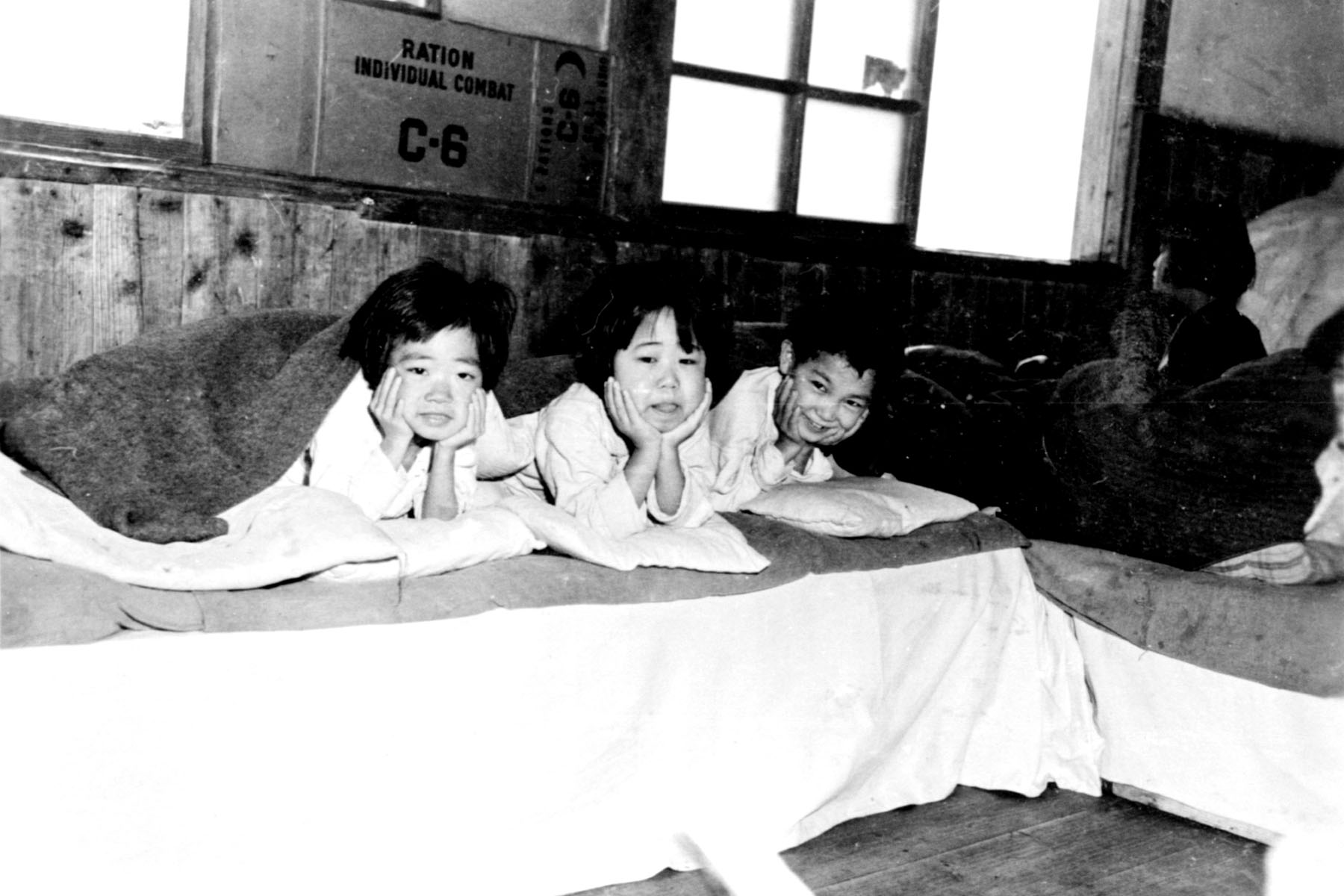
Korean orphans at Cheju Island

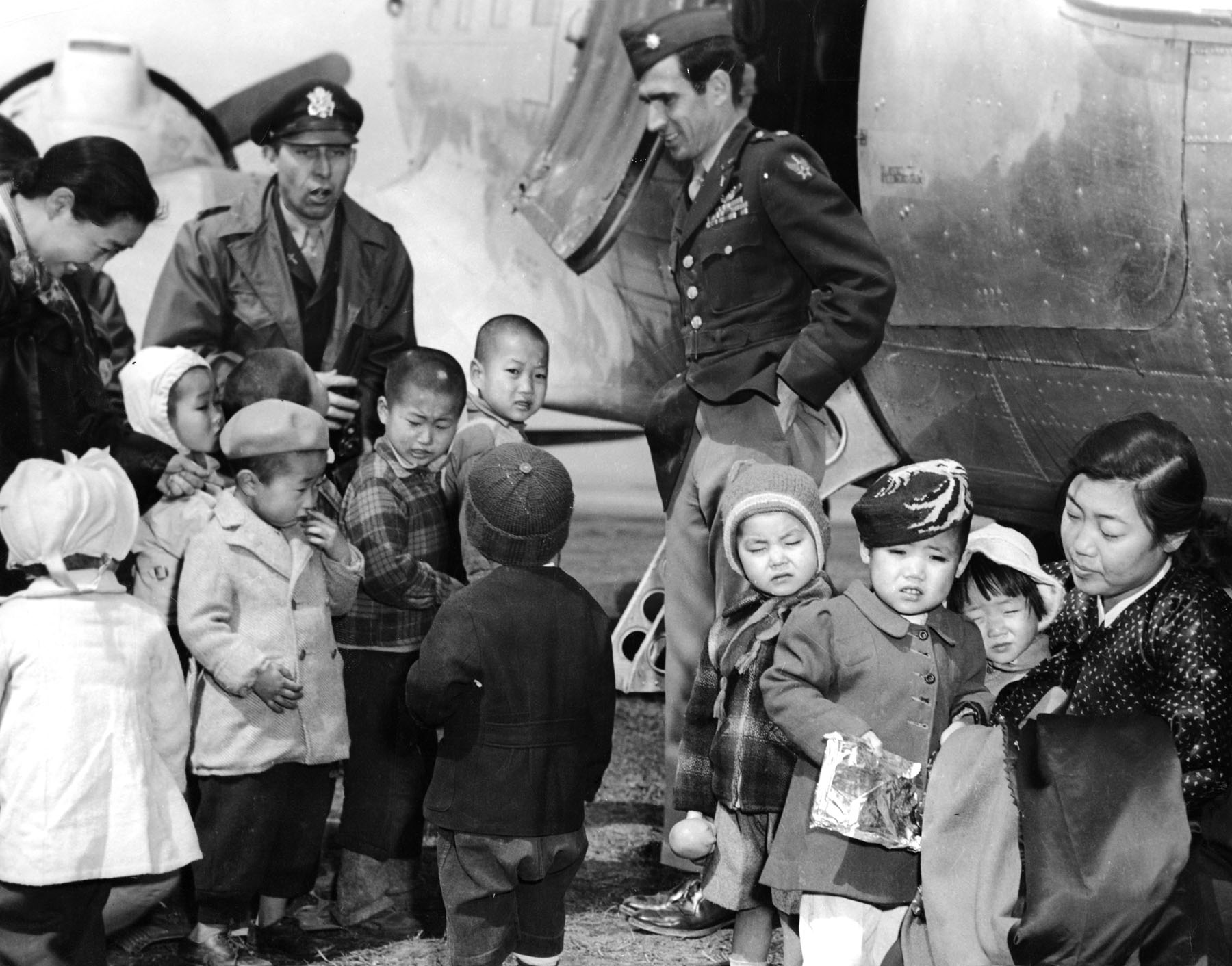
LTC Blaisdell and COL Hess visit orphans on Cheju Island

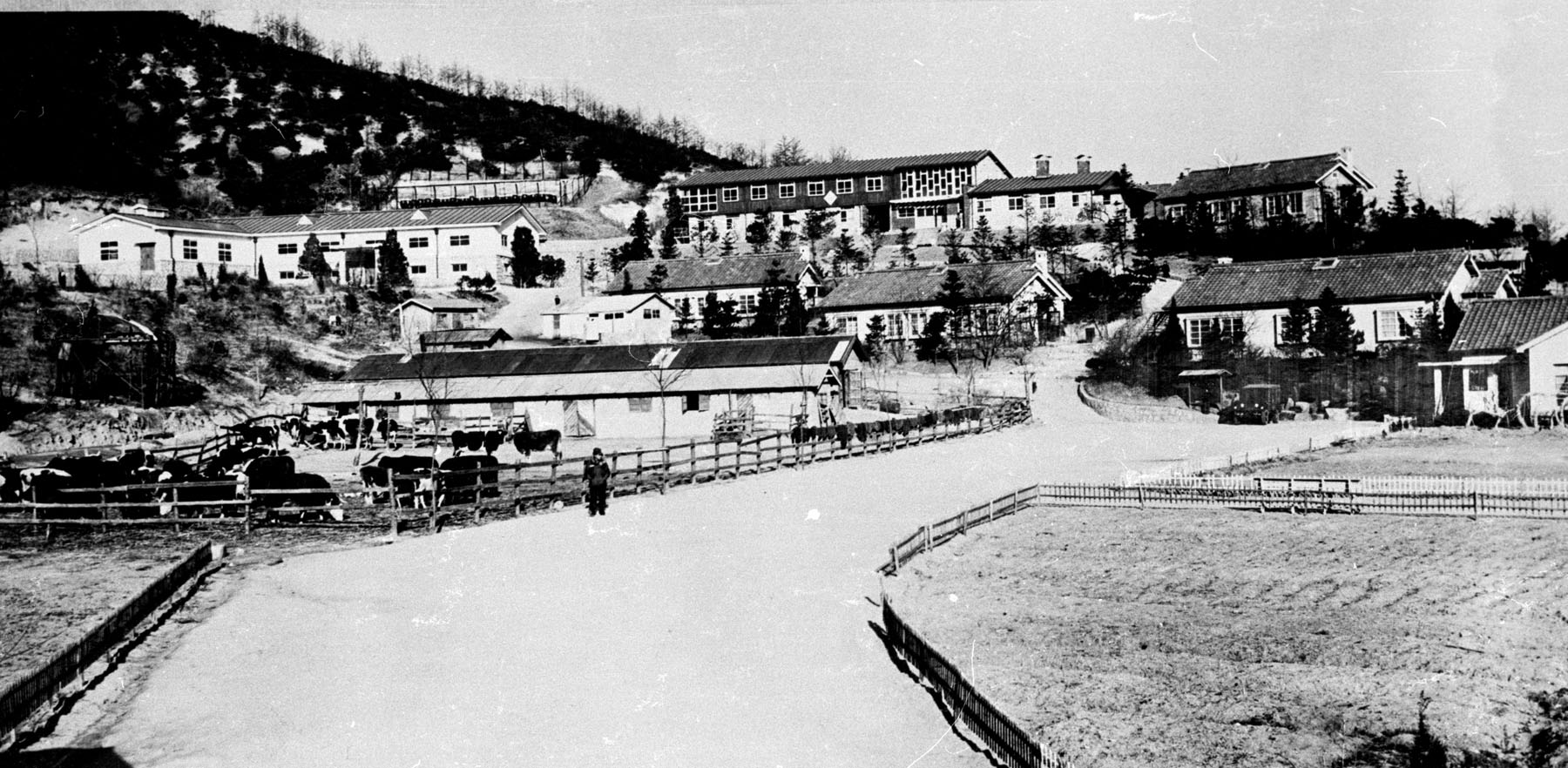
The Seoul orphanage in 1961, built with royalties Dean Hess received from his book Battle Hymn and the film adaptation

== Later life ==
Hess published his autobiography in 1956 and used the royalties to fund a new orphanage in Seoul. He retired from the air force in 1969. For his actions in Korea, he was awarded the Republic of Korea Honor, and the Korean Order of Cultural Merit. He has received numerous other awards, including the Order of the White Elephant, a Presidential Citation, the Legion of Merit, Silver Star, Air Medal with 19 Clusters, and the Ohio Governor's Award. He was inducted into the Miami Valley Walk of Fame; his actions are also the subject of an exhibit at the National Museum of the U.S. Air Force. He died aged 97 in 2015.

== Personal life ==
Hess was married to Mary C. Lorentz (1941–1996) (her death) and had 4 children, Marilyn, Lawrence, Edward Alan, Ronald.

== Criticism ==
In 2004 one critic, Dr. George F. Drake, took issue with Hess's portrayal of the Kiddy Car Airlift, claiming that Hess took more credit than deserved for the evacuation of the Korean orphans. Drake gave Air Force Chaplain LTC Russell L. Blaisdell and Staff Sergeant Merle Y. Strang the credit for arranging the transport for the evacuation, with Hess's role being reduced to providing accommodation on the island of Cheju itself. According to this criticism, Blaisdell was reportedly originally credited with the evacuation by the media until Battle Hymn was published. Drake terms Hess's claims as "fraudulent" but acknowledges that the proceeds from Battle Hymn and royalties from the movie were donated to charity to aid Korean orphans.

Blaisdell did receive recognition in 2000 when he returned to Korea, where he was referred to as the "Schindler of Korea," credit which Hess appeared to have agreed with, having in that same year acknowledged Blaisdell's contribution. Strang, however, died in 1998 before receiving recognition for his role.

== See also ==
- Korean War
- Oskar Schindler
- IMDB Battle Hymn 1957 film
- Obituary for Milton Bellovin, participant in the "Kiddy Car Airlift."
