= Battle Hymn (film) =

1957 film by Douglas Sirk

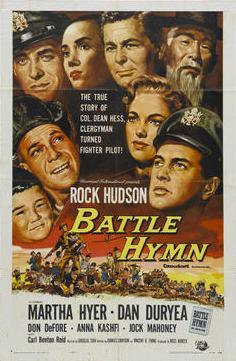
- Film poster by Reynold Brown
- Directed by: Douglas Sirk
- Written by: Vincent B. Evans; Charles Grayson
- Based on: Battle Hymn (1956 autobiography) by Dean Hess
- Produced by: Ross Hunter
- Starring: Rock Hudson; Anna Kashfi; Dan Duryea
- Cinematography: Russell Metty (Note: Although listed as a Technicolor feature in promotional material, Battle Hymn was printed by Technicolor labs but was shot on Eastmancolor.)
- Edited by: Russell F. Schoengarth
- Music by: Frank Skinner
- Production company: Universal Pictures
- Distributed by: Universal Pictures
- Release date: February 14, 1957
- Running time: 108 minutes
- Country: United States
- Language: English
- Box office: $3.9 million (US)

Battle Hymn is a 1957 American war film directed by Douglas Sirk and starring Rock Hudson as Lieutenant Colonel Dean E. Hess, a real-life United States Air Force fighter pilot in the Korean War who helped evacuate several hundred war orphans to safety. The cast also includes Anna Kashfi, Dan Duryea, Don DeFore, Philip Ahn, and Martha Hyer. The film was produced by Ross Hunter and filmed in CinemaScope.

Hess's autobiography of the same name was published concurrently with the release of the film. He donated his profits from the film and the book to a network of orphanages he helped to establish. The film is one of the most well-known American films about the Korean War. In South Korea, it is noted for its depiction of Col. Hess (known as the "Father of the Korean War Orphans"), and is aired annually during Memorial Day.

== Plot ==
In the summer of 1950, one month after North Korea's invasion of South Korea, Dean Hess has been a small town minister in Ohio for two years. He has been suffering a crisis of conscience, however. He realizes he cannot continue as a Protestant minister due to the overwhelming guilt he still feels from accidentally dropping a bomb on an orphanage and killing 37 children, when he was a fighter pilot flying over Germany during World War II. Hess volunteers to return to the cockpit, leaving his wife behind in Ohio. He promises her he won't see combat, since he will be the senior USAF advisor/Instructor Pilot to the Republic of Korea Air Force, only serving as a teacher and flying F-51D Mustangs.

As Hess and his cadre of USAF instructors train the South Korean pilots, young orphaned Korean refugees begin to gather at the base - first a few, but soon dozens. Hess takes pity on the children and orders them to be fed. Soon, he solicits the aid of two Korean adults, En Soon Yang and Lun Wa, and establishes a shelter for the orphans in an abandoned Buddhist temple, which soon has over 400 children. En Soon Yang falls in love with Hess, but does not tell him directly. Instead, she tells him of a Korean tradition that the pine tree represents eternity, because it does not change with the seasons. She tells him of two pine trees planted on her native island of Cheju, honoring two lovers who could not be together in this life. Later, she listens, heartbroken, as he tells her his wife back home is pregnant.

Capt. Skidmore chooses to engage an enemy convoy while on a training mission, even though they have been forbidden to do so, because it could risk their planes, which are needed for training. Hess punishes Skidmore on his return, and Skidmore wonders aloud what has become of the fierce warrior he knew in World War II. Hess's identity as a minister back home (which he has kept a secret) is finally revealed by a letter addressed to "Reverend Dean Hess." When North Korean forces near the training facility, Hess must go into combat again, with his men, and finds himself forced to kill another human being, when he must shoot down a North Korean plane that is about to down one of his men. Skidmore is killed in the battle, but as he dies in Hess's arms, Hess is able to speak words that give Skidmore comfort, restoring Hess's faith in his ability to be a minister.

Hess receives transfer orders and says his farewells to En Soon Yang, but once back in Seoul he learns that the North Koreans are on the verge of capturing the city, and the area around the orphanage has been abandoned to them. He hurries back and helps En Soon Yang evacuate the four hundred orphans on foot, struggling unsuccessfully to find planes or ships that can rescue them all. As they shelter at an abandoned airfield, a North Korean jet strafes the refugees, and En Soon Yang is shot as she throws herself in front of a young girl. Mortally wounded, she dies in Hess's arms.

Soon after they bury her, when all hope seems nearly lost, a squadron of USAF cargo aircraft suddenly shows up, sent by Hess's commanding officer, to evacuate them all to Cheju island, where En Soon Yang described an abandoned building that could be used as an orphanage. Some time later, after the Armistice, Hess and his wife return to Cheju to visit the orphanage, which has been dedicated to En Soon Yang and sits next to the two pine trees she spoke of earlier.

== Cast ==
- Rock Hudson as Lt. Col. Dean Hess
- Anna Kashfi as En Soon Yang
- Dan Duryea as Sgt. Herman
- Don DeFore as Capt. Dan Skidmore
- Martha Hyer as Mary Hess
- Jock Mahoney as Maj. Moore
- Philip Ahn as Lun-Wa
- James Edwards as Lt. Maples
- Carl Benton Reid as Deacon Edwards
- Bartlett Robinson as Gen. Timberidge
- Simon Scott as Lt. Hollis
- Alan Hale Jr. as Mess Sergeant
- Jung Kyoo Pyo as Chu
- James Hong as Maj. Chong
- Teru Shimada as Korean Official
- Carleton Young as Maj. Harrison
- Ralph Ahn as Lt. Park
- Amzie Strickland as Mrs. Peterson
- General Earle E. Partridge as himself

== Historical accuracy ==
Like many biographical and historical films, Battle Hymn takes significant artistic license in depicting the life and wartime activities of Hess and his colleagues.

- The film depicts Dean Hess as a minister in West Hampton, Ohio, retired from active duty, who volunteers for combat service in the Air Force in July 1950. In reality, Hess was recalled to duty in July 1948, and transferred to Japan in April 1950, two months before the North Korean invasion across the 38th parallel. Furthermore, Hess had stopped preaching in December 1941 after first enlisting in the Air Force, and at the time of his recall was completing a doctoral degree in history and psychology at Ohio State University.
- Hess' hometown was Marietta, not the fictionalized "West Hampton" as depicted in the film.
- The film fictionalizes an incident in which Hess accidentally killed 37 children in Germany during World War II, after dropping a bomb on an orphanage. The real incident occurred in Kaiserslautern, whereas the film states it took place in "Kaiserberg", said to be the birthplace of his late grandmother. Furthermore, Hess did not return to the site after the incident occurred as depicted in the film.
- In the film, there was an incident where a pilot named Lieutenant Maples (played by James Edwards and based on Ernest Craigwell) accidentally strafes a truckload of civilian refugees that happened to be near a convoy of North Korean troop trucks. In the real-life incident, it was a fishing junk full of civilian refugees that happened to be near an amphibious assault by North Korean landing craft. The film also removes Hess' involvement in a similar accident, in which he inadvertently strafed a group of refugees due to misinformation received from a liaison pilot.
- En Soon Yang (played by Anna Kashfi) is based on On Soon Hwang, a social worker who became the directress of the Cheju orphanage and later chaperoned the Korean orphans who participated in the film's production. Unlike En Soon, the real On Soon was twenty years Hess' senior and did not die in a bombing raid as depicted in the film. She was also not half-Anglo-Indian as depicted in the film.

== Production ==
The real Lt. Col. Hess was a technical advisor to Universal to ensure that the final production did not stray far from his original biography. Nonetheless, the inevitable "Hollywood" screenplay prevailed. Hess had a hand in vetoing the studio's first choice to play him: Robert Mitchum, having reservations about the actor's character. Unable to film in Korea, locations shifted to Nogales, Arizona that provided at least a modicum of similar landscape. On Soon Whang, Director of the Orphans Home of Korea arrived in the U.S. along with 25 orphans who would reprise their own lives on film.

Rock Hudson as Col. Hess gathers up a group of orphans.

In order to replicate the ROK unit, the 12 F-51D Mustangs of 182nd Fighter Squadron, 149th Fighter Group of the Texas Air National Guard were enlisted by the USAF to provide the necessary authentic aircraft of the period. During filming, an additional surplus F-51 was acquired from USAF stocks to be used in an accident scene where it would be deliberately destroyed.

The gold flying helmet with the United Nations emblem that Rock Hudson wears in the movie was Dean Hess's actual helmet. It was a Navy-issue helmet that Hess scrounged from a Navy pilot who crash-landed at their airfield in Korea (since the Navy pilot was going to be issued a new helmet as a result of the crash-landing). The helmet is now on display at the National Museum of the United States Air Force at Wright-Patterson AFB, Dayton, Ohio.

ANG F-51Ds "stood in" for the ROK.

Richard Loo filmed scenes as a character based on ROK Air Force chief General Kim Chung-yul, which were deleted from the final release print, though he was still listed in the film's credits.

== Premiere ==
The film's premiere was held on February 12, 1957, at the Colony Cinema (now the Peoples Bank Theatre), in Marietta, Ohio - the birth city of Dean Hess. 25,000 fans turned out to see Hudson and the other stars.

== Reception ==
Bosley Crowther wrote about the film in The New York Times, saying, "Perhaps the most candid comment to be made about Universal's 'Battle Hymn' is also the most propitious, so far as its box-office chances are concerned. That is to say, it is conventional. It follows religiously the line of mingled piety and pugnacity laid down for standard idealistic service films. What's more, it has Rock Hudson playing the big hero role. And it is in CinemaScope and color. Wrap them up and what have you got? The popular thing." Other reviews commented "Historians will like this movie, as it accurately portrays the most important moments in the subject's life. For this, it cannot be faulted. Military enthusiasts will be similarly impressed with it for it what it gets right. The movie-going public on the other hand, may find it boring."

== Popular culture ==
A poster for Battle Hymn appears outside the movie theater in the 1959 pilot episode of The Twilight Zone, "Where Is Everybody?"

== See also ==
- List of American films of 1957
