= List of former airline hubs =

This is a list of former airline hubs of major passenger airlines.

== North America ==
=== Active airlines ===
Airline	Hub airport
(United States) American Airlines	(United States) Boston Logan International Airport (United States) Nashville International Airport (United States) Raleigh–Durham International Airport (United States) Norman Y. Mineta San Jose International Airport (United States) St. Louis Lambert International Airport (United States) Luis Muñoz Marín International Airport (San Juan)
(United States) Delta Air Lines	(United States) Cincinnati/Northern Kentucky International Airport (United States) Memphis International Airport (United States) Dallas/Fort Worth International Airport (Germany) Frankfurt Airport (Japan) Narita International Airport (Tokyo) (Netherlands) Amsterdam Airport Schiphol (United States) Portland International Airport (Oregon) (United States) Orlando International Airport
(United States) Frontier Airlines	(United States) Milwaukee Mitchell International Airport (United States) Kansas City International Airport (United States) Washington Dulles International Airport (United States) Wilmington Airport (Delaware)
(United States) JetBlue	(United States) Long Beach Airport
(United States) United Airlines	(United States) Miami International Airport (Japan) Narita International Airport (Tokyo) (United States) Cleveland Hopkins International Airport
(Canada) WestJet	(Canada) John C. Munro Hamilton International Airport

=== Defunct airlines ===
Airline	Hub airport
(United States) AccessAir	(United States) Des Moines International Airport
(United States) AirTran Airways	(United States) Hartsfield–Jackson Atlanta International Airport (United States) Baltimore/Washington International Thurgood Marshall Airport (United States) Milwaukee Mitchell International Airport (United States) Orlando International Airport
(United States) Allegheny Airlines	(United States) Allegheny County Airport (United States) Pittsburgh International Airport
(United States) America West Airlines	(United States) John Glenn Columbus International Airport (United States) Harry Reid International Airport (Las Vegas) (United States) Phoenix Sky Harbor International Airport
(United States) ATA Airlines	(United States) Chicago Midway International Airport (United States) Daniel K. Inouye International Airport (Honolulu) (United States) Indianapolis International Airport (United States) Oakland International Airport
(United States) Braniff International Airways	(United States) Boston Logan International Airport (United States) Chicago O'Hare International Airport (United States) Dallas/Fort Worth International Airport (United States) Dallas Love Field (United States) Stapleton International Airport (Denver) (United States) Daniel K. Inouye International Airport (Honolulu) (United States) George Bush Intercontinental Airport (Houston) (United States) Kansas City International Airport (United States) Los Angeles International Airport (United States) Miami International Airport (United States) Newark Liberty International Airport (United States) Washington Dulles International Airport
(Canada) Canadian Airlines International	(Canada) Calgary International Airport (Canada) Edmonton International Airport (Canada) Halifax Stanfield International Airport (Canada) Montréal–Dorval International Airport (Canada) Ottawa Macdonald–Cartier International Airport (Canada) Toronto Pearson International Airport (Canada) Vancouver International Airport
(Canada) Canadian Pacific Air Lines	(Canada) Vancouver International Airport
(United States) Comair	(United States) Hartsfield–Jackson Atlanta International Airport (United States) Boston Logan International Airport (United States) Cincinnati/Northern Kentucky International Airport (United States) John F. Kennedy International Airport (New York City) (United States) LaGuardia Airport (New York City) (United States) Orlando International Airport
(United States) Continental Airlines	(United States) Cleveland Hopkins International Airport (United States) Stapleton International Airport (Denver)* (United States) El Paso International Airport (United States) Piedmont Triad International Airport (Greensboro) (Guam) Antonio B. Won Pat International Airport (United States) George Bush Intercontinental Airport (Houston) (United States) Los Angeles International Airport (United States) Newark Liberty International Airport
(United States) Delta Express, a low-cost carrier operated by Delta Air Lines	(United States) Boston Logan International Airport (United States) John F. Kennedy International Airport (New York City) (United States) Orlando International Airport
(United States) Eastern Air Lines	(United States) Hartsfield–Jackson Atlanta International Airport (United States) Charlotte Douglas International Airport (United States) Chicago O'Hare International Airport (United States) Kansas City International Airport (United States) Miami International Airport (United States) John F. Kennedy International Airport (New York City) (United States) LaGuardia Airport (New York City) (United States) Orlando International Airport (United States) Philadelphia International Airport (Puerto Rico) Luis Muñoz Marín International Airport (San Juan) (United States) Tampa International Airport (United States) Ronald Reagan Washington National Airport
(United States) Frontier Airlines (1950-1986)	(United States) Stapleton International Airport (Denver)
(United States) Independence Air	(United States) Washington Dulles International Airport
(United States) Lake Central Airlines	(United States) Indianapolis International Airport
(Mexico) Mexicana de Aviación	Cancún International Airport; Miguel Hidalgo y Costilla Guadalajara International Airport; Mexico City International Airport
(United States) Midway Airlines (1976-1991)	(United States) Chicago Midway International Airport
(United States) Midway Airlines (1993-2003)	(United States) Raleigh–Durham International Airport
(United States) Midwest Airlines	(United States) Milwaukee Mitchell International Airport (United States) Eppley Airfield (Omaha)
(United States) National Airlines (1934–1980)	(United States) Miami International Airport
(United States) National Airlines (1999–2002)	(United States) Harry Reid International Airport (Las Vegas)
(United States) Northeast Airlines	(United States) Boston Logan International Airport
(United States) Northwest Airlines	(Netherlands) Amsterdam Airport Schiphol (United States) Detroit Metropolitan Wayne County Airport (United States) Indianapolis International Airport (United States) Los Angeles International Airport (United States) Memphis International Airport (United States) Minneapolis–Saint Paul International Airport (United States) John F. Kennedy International Airport (New York City) (Japan) Haneda Airport (Tokyo) (Japan) Narita International Airport (Tokyo)
(United States) Pacific Southwest Airlines	(United States) Los Angeles International Airport (United States) San Diego International Airport (United States) San Francisco International Airport
(United States) Pan Am	(East Germany) Berlin Tegel Airport (East Germany) Berlin Tempelhof Airport (United States) Boston Logan International Airport (United States) Chicago O'Hare International Airport (West Germany) Frankfurt Airport (British Hong Kong) Kai Tak Airport (Hong Kong) (United States) Daniel K. Inouye International Airport (Honolulu) (United States) George Bush Intercontinental Airport (Houston) (United Kingdom) Heathrow Airport (London) (United States) Los Angeles International Airport (United States) Miami International Airport (United States) John F. Kennedy International Airport (New York City) (United States) San Francisco International Airport (Japan) Haneda Airport (Tokyo) (Japan) Narita International Airport (Tokyo) (United States) Washington Dulles International Airport
(United States) People Express Airlines (1980s)	(United States) Newark Liberty International Airport
(United States) Piedmont Airlines (1948–1989)	(United States) Baltimore/Washington International Thurgood Marshall Airport (United States) Charlotte Douglas International Airport (United States) Dayton International Airport (United States) Syracuse Hancock International Airport
(United States) Red Baron Airlines	(United States) Palm Beach International Airport
(United States) Reno Air	(United States) Reno–Tahoe International Airport (United States) Norman Y. Mineta San Jose International Airport (United States) Harry Reid International Airport (Las Vegas)
(United States) Republic Airlines (1979–1986)	(United States) Hartsfield–Jackson Atlanta International Airport (United States) Chicago O'Hare International Airport (United States) Detroit Metropolitan Wayne County Airport (United States) Harry Reid International Airport (Las Vegas) (United States) Los Angeles International Airport (United States) Memphis International Airport (United States) Minneapolis–Saint Paul International Airport (United States) Phoenix Sky Harbor International Airport (United States) San Francisco International Airport (United States) Seattle–Tacoma International Airport
(United States) Skybus Airlines	(United States) John Glenn Columbus International Airport (United States) Piedmont Triad International Airport (Greensboro)
(United States) Song, a low-cost carrier operated by Delta Air Lines	(United States) Boston Logan International Airport (United States) Fort Lauderdale–Hollywood International Airport (United States) John F. Kennedy International Airport (New York City) (United States) Orlando International Airport
(United States) Spirit Airlines	(United States) Atlantic City International Airport (United States) Detroit Metropolitan Airport (United States) Fort Lauderdale–Hollywood International Airport (United States) Harry Reid International Airport (Las Vegas) (United States) Hartsfield–Jackson Atlanta International Airport (United States) Orlando International Airport
(United States) Ted, a low-cost carrier operated by United Airlines	(United States) Chicago O'Hare International Airport (United States) Denver International Airport (United States) Los Angeles International Airport (United States) San Francisco International Airport (United States) Washington Dulles International Airport
(United States) Trans World Airlines	(Greece) Ellinikon International Airport (Athens) (United States) Hartsfield–Jackson Atlanta International Airport (United States) Boston Logan International Airport (United States) Stapleton International Airport (Denver) (United States) Kansas City International Airport (United States) Los Angeles International Airport (United States) John F. Kennedy International Airport (New York City) (France) Charles de Gaulle Airport (Paris) (United States) Pittsburgh International Airport (Puerto Rico) Luis Muñoz Marín International Airport (San Juan) (United States) St. Louis Lambert International Airport
(United States) US Airways	(United States) Baltimore/Washington International Thurgood Marshall Airport (United States) Charlotte Douglas International Airport (United States) Dayton International Airport (United States) Indianapolis International Airport (United States) Kansas City International Airport (United States) Harry Reid International Airport (Las Vegas) (United States) Philadelphia International Airport (United States) Phoenix Sky Harbor International Airport (United States) Pittsburgh International Airport (United States) Syracuse Hancock International Airport (United States) Ronald Reagan Washington National Airport
(United States) Vanguard Airlines	(United States) Chicago Midway International Airport (United States) Kansas City International Airport
(United States) Virgin America	(United States) Dallas Love Field (United States) Los Angeles International Airport (United States) San Francisco International Airport
(United States) Western Airlines	(United States) Stapleton International Airport (Denver) (United States) Los Angeles International Airport (United States) Salt Lake City International Airport
(United States) Western Pacific Airlines	(United States) Colorado Springs Airport (United States) Denver International Airport

* Now closed Stapleton International Airport has been replaced by Denver International Airport as the only major airport serving Denver, however, Continental Airlines did not have hub operations at Denver International.

== Europe ==
=== Active airlines ===
Airline	Hub airport
Air France	(France) Le Havre – Octeville Airport
(United Kingdom) British Airways	(West Germany) Berlin Tegel Airport
(Spain) Iberia	(United States) Miami International Airport (Dominican Republic) Las Américas International Airport (Santo Domingo)
(United Kingdom) Virgin Atlantic	(United Kingdom) Gatwick Airport (London)
(United Kingdom) easyJet	(United Kingdom) Southend Airport (London)

=== Defunct airlines ===
Airline	Hub airport
(Ukraine) Aerosvit Airlines	(Ukraine) Dnipro International Airport (Ukraine) Donetsk International Airport (Ukraine) Kyiv Boryspil Airport (Ukraine) Odesa International Airport (Ukraine) Simferopol International Airport
(Belgium) Air Antwerp	(Belgium) Antwerp International Airport
(Germany) Air Berlin	(Germany) Berlin Tegel Airport (Germany) Düsseldorf Airport (Spain) Palma de Mallorca Airport
(France) Air Inter	(France) Paris Orly Airport
(France) Air Liberté	(France) Paris Orly Airport
(France) Air Littoral	(France) Marseille Provence Airport (France) Montpellier–Méditerranée Airport (France) Nice Côte d'Azur Airport (France) Paris Orly Airport
Air Malta	Malta International Airport
Air Moldova	(Moldova) Chisinau International Airport
(United Kingdom) Air Southwest	(United Kingdom) Bristol (Lulsgate) Airport (United Kingdom) Newquay Airport (United Kingdom) Plymouth City Airport
(Albania) Albawings	(Albania) Tirana International Airport Nënë Tereza
(Italy) Alitalia	(Italy) Milan Linate Airport (Italy) Milan Malpensa Airport (Italy) Naples International Airport (Italy) Leonardo da Vinci–Fiumicino Airport (Rome)
(France) AOM French Airlines	(France) Paris Orly Airport
(Spain) Aura Airlines	(Spain) Madrid–Barajas Airport
(Ukraine) Bees Airline	(Ukraine) Kyiv International Airport (Zhuliany)
(Romania) Bees Airlines	(Romania) Bucharest Henri Coandă International Airport (Romania) Suceava Ștefan cel Mare International Airport
(Switzerland) Belair	(Switzerland) (France) (Germany) EuroAirport Basel Mulhouse Freiburg (Switzerland) Zurich Airport
(Guernsey) Blue Islands	Guernsey Airport; Jersey Airport
(United Kingdom) British Caledonian	(United Kingdom) Gatwick Airport (London)
(United Kingdom) British Midland International	(United Kingdom) Heathrow Airport (London)
(Switzerland) Crossair	(Switzerland) (France) (Germany) EuroAirport Basel Mulhouse Freiburg
(Czech Republic) Czech Airlines	(Czech Republic) Václav Havel Airport Prague
(Germany) DBA	(Germany) Berlin Tegel Airport (Germany) Munich Airport
(Belgium) Delta Air Transport	(Belgium) Antwerp International Airport (Belgium) Brussels Airport
(Iceland) Eagle Air	(Iceland) Reykjavik Airport
(United Kingdom) Eastern Airways	(United Kingdom) Aberdeen International Airport (United Kingdom) Cornwall Airport Newquay (United Kingdom) Humberside Airport
(Italy) Ernest Airlines	(Italy) Milan Malpensa Airport
(United Kingdom) Flybe (1st iteration)	(United Kingdom) Birmingham Airport (United Kingdom) Exeter Airport (United Kingdom) Manchester Airport
(United Kingdom) Flybe (2nd iteration)	(United Kingdom) Belfast City Airport (United Kingdom) Birmingham Airport
(Bosnia and Herzegovina) FlyBosnia	(Bosnia and Herzegovina) Sarajevo International Airport
(Germany) Germania	(Germany) Berlin Schönefeld Airport (Germany) Berlin Tegel Airport (Germany) Bremen Airport (Germany) Dresden Airport (Germany) Düsseldorf Airport (Germany) Erfurt-Weimar Airport (Germany) Friedrichshafen Airport (Germany) Hamburg Airport (Germany) Munich Airport (Germany) Münster Osnabrück Airport (Germany) Nuremberg Airport (Spain) Palma de Mallorca Airport (Kosovo) Pristina International Airport (Germany) Rostock Airport
(Germany) Germanwings	(Germany) Berlin Schönefeld Airport (Germany) Berlin Tegel Airport (Germany) Cologne Bonn Airport (Germany) Dortmund Airport (Germany) Hamburg Airport (Germany) Hannover Airport (Germany) Munich Airport (Germany) Stuttgart Airport
(Denmark) Great Dane Airlines	(Denmark) Aalborg Airport
(East Germany) Interflug	(East Germany) Berlin Schönefeld Airport
(France) Joon	(France) Paris Charles de Gaulle International Airport
(Austria) Lauda Air	(Austria) Graz Airport (Austria) Innsbruck Airport (Austria) Linz Airport (Austria) Vienna International Airport
Lauda Air Italy	(Italy) Milan Malpensa Airport
(Austria) LaudaMotion	(Germany) Düsseldorf Airport (Germany) Stuttgart Airport (Spain) Palma de Mallorca Airport (Austria) Vienna International Airport
(Austria) Level Europe	(Spain) Palma de Mallorca Airport (Austria) Vienna International Airport
(Germany) LTU International	(Germany) Berlin Tegel Airport (Germany) Düsseldorf Airport (Germany) Munich Airport
(Italy) Lufthansa Italia	(Italy) Milan Malpensa Airport
(Hungary) Malév Hungarian Airlines	(Hungary) Budapest Ferenc Liszt International Airport
Montenegro Airlines	(Montenegro) Podgorica Airport (Montenegro) Tivat Airport
(Sweden) NextJet	(Sweden) Stockholm Arlanda Airport
(Austria) Niki	(Austria) Vienna International Airport
(Estonia) Nordica	(Estonia) Tallinn International Airport
(Greece) Olympic Airlines	(Greece) Ellinikon International Airport (Athens) (Greece) Athens International Airport (Greece) Heraklion International Airport (United Kingdom) Heathrow Airport (London) (Greece) Rhodes Maritsa Airport (Greece) Rhodes International Airport (Greece) Thessaloniki Airport
(France) OpenSkies	(France) Paris Orly Airport
(Iceland) Play	(Iceland) Keflavik International Airport
(France) Regional Airlines	(France) Clermont-Ferrand Auvergne Airport
(Belgium) Sabena	(Belgium) Brussels Airport
(Lithuania) Small Planet Airlines	(Netherlands) Amsterdam Airport Schiphol (Greece) Chania International Airport (France) Paris Charles de Gaulle Airport (Sweden) Stockholm Arlanda Airport (Lithuania) Vilnius Airport
(Belgium) SN Brussels Airlines	(Belgium) Brussels Airport
(Spain) Spanair	(Spain) Josep Tarradellas Barcelona–El Prat Airport (Spain) Adolfo Suárez Madrid–Barajas Airport (Spain) Palma de Mallorca Airport (Spain) Tenerife North–Ciudad de La Laguna Airport
(Republic of Ireland) Stobart Air	(United Kingdom) Belfast City Airport (Republic of Ireland) Cork Airport (Republic of Ireland) Dublin Airport
(Switzerland) Swissair	(Switzerland) (France) (Germany) EuroAirport Basel Mulhouse Freiburg (Switzerland) Geneva Airport (Switzerland) Zurich Airport
(Bulgaria) Tayaranjet	(Italy) Trapani–Birgi Airport
(United Kingdom) Thomas Cook Airlines	(United Kingdom) Belfast International Airport (United Kingdom) Birmingham Airport (United Kingdom) Bristol Airport (United Kingdom) Cardiff Airport (United Kingdom) East Midlands Airport (United Kingdom) Glasgow Airport (United Kingdom) London Gatwick Airport (United Kingdom) London Stansted Airport (United Kingdom) Manchester Airport (United Kingdom) Newcastle International Airport
(Germany) Thomas Cook Aviation	(Germany) Düsseldorf Airport (Germany) Leipzig/Halle Airport
(Russia) Transaero	(Russia) Vnukovo International Airport (Moscow) (Russia) Pulkovo Airport (St. Petersburg) (Russia) Sochi International Airport (Russia) Koltsovo International Airport (Yekaterinburg)
(Austria) Tyrolean Airways	(Austria) Graz Airport (Austria) Innsbruck Airport (Austria) Salzburg Airport (Austria) Vienna International Airport
(Ukraine) Ukrainian International Airlines	(Ukraine) Kyiv Boryspil Airport
(Belgium) Virgin Express	(Belgium) Brussels Airport
(United Kingdom) Virgin Sun Airlines	(United Kingdom) Gatwick Airport (London) (United Kingdom) Manchester Airport
(Iceland) Wow Air	(Iceland) Keflavik International Airport
XL Airways France	(France) Paris Charles De Gaulle Airport

== Asia ==
=== Defunct airlines ===
Airline	Hub airport
(Pakistan) Aero Asia International	(Pakistan) Allama Iqbal International Airport (Lahore) (Pakistan) Jinnah International Airport (Karachi)
Air Armenia	(Armenia) Zvartnots International Airport (Yerevan)
(Myanmar) Air Bagan	(Myanmar) Mandalay International Airport (Myanmar) Yangon International Airport
(Kyrgyzstan) Air Bishkek	(Kyrgyzstan) Manas International Airport (Bishkek)
(India) Air Carnival	(India) Chennai International Airport (India) Coimbatore International Airport
(India) Air Costa	(India) Chennai International Airport
(Armenia) Air Dilijans	(Armenia) Gyumri Shirak International Airport (Armenia) Zvartnots International Airport
(Japan) Air Hokkaido	(Japan) Hakodate Airport
(Pakistan) Air Indus	(Pakistan) Jinnah International Airport
Air Kyrgyzstan	(Kyrgyzstan) Manas International Airport (Kyrgyzstan) Osh Airport
Air Maldives	(Maldives) Ibrahim Nasir International Airport (Malé)
(Myanmar) Air Mandalay	(Myanmar) Mandalay International Airport (Myanmar) Yangon International Airport
(Vietnam) Air Mekong	(Vietnam) Noi Bai International Airport (Hanoi) (Vietnam) Phu Quoc International Airport (Vietnam) Tan Son Nhat International Airport (Ho Chi Minh City)
(Japan) Air Next	(Japan) Fukuoka Airport
(India) Air Pegasus	(India) Kempegowda International Airport (Bengaluru)
(South Korea) Air Philip	(South Korea) Gwangju Airport (South Korea) Muan International Airport
(South Korea) Air Pohang	(South Korea) Pohang Airport
(Timor-Leste) Air Timor	(Timor-Leste) Presidente Nicolau Lobato International Airport
(Jordan) Air Universal	(Jordan) Queen Alia International Airport (Amman)
(Philippines) AirAsia Zest	(Philippines) Kalibo International Airport (Philippines) Mactan-Cebu International Airport (Philippines) Ninoy Aquino International Airport (Manila)
(India) AIX Connect	(India) Kempegowda International Airport (India) Indira Gandhi International Airport (Delhi) (India) Netaji Subhas Chandra Bose International Airport (Kolkata) (India) Chhatrapati Shivaji Maharaj International Airport (Mumbai)
(Iraq) Al Naser Wings Airlines	(Iraq) Baghdad International Airport
(Cambodia) Angkor Airways	(Cambodia) Phnom Penh International Airport
(Tajikistan) Asia Airways	(Tajikistan) Dushanbe International Airport
(Armenia) Atlantis Armenian Airlines	(Armenia) Zvartnots International Airport
(Iran) Atrak Air	(Iran) Bojnord Airport
(Indonesia) Aviastar	(Indonesia) Douw Aturure Airport (Indonesia) I Gusti Ngurah Rai International Airport (Denpasar) (Indonesia) Soekarno-Hatta International Airport (Jakarta) (Indonesia) Sultan Aji Muhammad Sulaiman Sepinggan Airport (Indonesia) Sultan Hasanuddin International Airport (Indonesia) Tjilik Riwut Airport
Bahrain Air	Bahrain International Airport
(Cambodia) Bassaka Air	(Cambodia) Phnom Penh International Airport
(Kazakhstan) Bek Air	(Kazakhstan) Oral Ak Zhol Airport
(Bangladesh) Best Air	(Bangladesh) Hazrat Shahjalal International Airport (Dhaka)
(Azerbaijan) Buta Airways	(Azerbaijan) Heydar Aliyev International Airport (Baku)
Cambodia Airlines	(Cambodia) Phnom Penh International Airport
(Hong Kong) Cathay Dragon	Hong Kong International Airport
(Thailand) City Airways	(Thailand) Don Mueang International Airport (Thailand) Phuket International Airport
(Kazakhstan) DETA Air	(Kazakhstan) Almaty International Airport
(Tajikistan) East Air	(Tajikistan) Kulob International Airport
(Taiwan) Far Eastern Air Transport	Taipei Songshan Airport; Taiwan Taoyuan International Airport
(Armenia) Fly Arna	(Armenia) Zvartnots International Airport
(Iraq) Fly Baghdad	(Iraq) Baghdad International Airport
(Syria) FlyDamas	(Syria) Damascus International Airport
(Georgia (country)) Georgian International Airlines	(Georgia (country)) Tbilisi International Airport
(Georgia (country)) Georgian Wings	(Georgia (country)) Tbilisi International Airport
(Bangladesh) GMG Airlines	(Bangladesh) Hazrat Shahjalal International Airport
Golden Myanmar Airlines	(Myanmar) Yangon International Airport
(Nepal) Gorkha Airlines	(Nepal) Tribhuvan International Airport (Kathmandu)
(Bahrain) Gulf Traveller	Bahrain International Airport (Oman) Seeb International Airport
(Nepal) Guna Airlines	(Nepal) Tribhuvan International Airport
(Thailand) Happy Air	(Thailand) Suvarnabhumi International Airport
(China) Henan Airlines	(China) Zhengzhou Xinzheng International Airport
(Uzbekistan) HumoAir	(Uzbekistan) Islam Karimov Tashkent International Airport
(India) Indian Airlines	(India) Indira Gandhi International Airport (India) Chhatrapati Shivaji Maharaj International Airport
Indonesia AirAsia X	(Indonesia) I Gusti Ngurah Rai International Airport (Indonesia) Soekarno-Hatta International Airport
Japan Asia Airways	(Japan) Chubu Centrair International Airport (Japan) Kansai International Airport (Japan) Narita International Airport; Taiwan Taoyuan International Airport
(Cambodia) JC International Airlines	(Cambodia) Phnom Penh International Airport
(India) Jet Airways	(India) Chhatrapati Shivaji Maharaj International Airport
(China) Joy Air	(China) Xi'an Xianyang International Airport
(Indonesia) Kalstar Aviation	(Indonesia) Juanda International Airport (Surabaya) (Indonesia) Supadio International Airport (Pontianak) (Indonesia) Temindung Airport (Samarinda)
(Thailand) Kan Air	(Thailand) Chiang Mai International Airport
(Afghanistan) Khyber Afghan Airlines	(Afghanistan) Jalalabad Airport
(Japan) Kyokushin Air	(Japan) Sado Airport
(Cambodia) Lanmei Airlines	(Cambodia) Phnom Penh International Airport (Cambodia) Siem Reap-Angkor International Airport
(Laos) Lao Central Airlines	(Laos) Wattay International Airport
(Philippines) Laoag International Airlines	(Philippines) Laoag International Airport
(Sri Lanka) Lionair	(Sri Lanka) Bandaranaike International Airport (Colombo) (Sri Lanka) Ratmalana International Airport (Colombo)
Mega Maldives	(Maldives) Ibrahim Nasir International Airport
(Sri Lanka) Mihin Lanka	(Sri Lanka) Bandaranaike International Airport
(Malaysia) MYAirline	(Malaysia) Kuala Lumpur International Airport
(Thailand) New Gen Airways	(Thailand) Chiang Mai International Airport (Thailand) Don Mueang International Airport (Thailand) Krabi International Airport (Thailand) Nakhon Ratchasima Airport (Thailand) Phuket International Airport (Thailand) U-Tapao International Airport (Pattaya)
(Thailand) NokScoot	(Thailand) Don Mueang International Airport
Oasis Hong Kong Airlines	Hong Kong International Airport
(Thailand) Orient Thai Airlines	(Thailand) Don Mueang International Airport
(China) OTT Airlines	(China) Shanghai Hongqiao Airport
(Palestine) Palestinian Airlines	(Egypt) El Arish International Airport
(Thailand) R Airlines	(Thailand) Don Mueang International Airport
(United Arab Emirates) RAK Airways	(United Arab Emirates) Ras Al Khaimah International Airport
(Malaysia) Rayani Air	(Malaysia) Kuala Lumpur International Airport
(Brunei) RB Link	Brunei International Airport
(Bangladesh) Regent Airways	(Bangladesh) Hazrat Shahjalal International Airport (Bangladesh) Shah Amanat International Airport (Chattogram)
(Afghanistan) Safi Airways	(Afghanistan) Ahmad Shah Baba International Airport (Kandahar) (Afghanistan) Kabul International Airport
(Saudi Arabia) SaudiGulf Airlines	(Saudi Arabia) King Fahd International Airport (Dammam)
(Pakistan) Shaheen Air	(Pakistan) Jinnah International Airport
(Thailand) Siam Air	(Thailand) Don Mueang International Airport
(Singapore) SilkAir	(Singapore) Changi Airport
(Malaysia) Silverfly	(Malaysia) Sultan Azlan Shah Airport
(Malaysia) SKS Airways	(Malaysia) Sultan Abdul Aziz Shah Airport
(Armenia) Taron Avia	(Armenia) Gyumri Shirak International Airport
(Thailand) Thai Smile	(Thailand) Suvarnabhumi International Airport
(Singapore) Tigerair	(Singapore) Changi Airport
(Indonesia) Tigerair Mandala	(Indonesia) Juanda International Airport (Indonesia) Soekarno-Hatta International Airport (Indonesia) Sultan Syarif Kasim II International Airport (Pekanbaru)
(Taiwan) TransAsia Airways	Kaohsiung International Airport; Taipei Songshan Airport; Taiwan Taoyuan International Airport
(Bangladesh) United Airways	(Bangladesh) Hazrat Shahjalal International Airport (Bangladesh) Osmani International Airport (Sylhet) (Bangladesh) Shah Amanat International Airport
(Israel) Up	(Israel) Ben Gurion International Airport (Tev Aviv)
(Taiwan) V Air	Taiwan Taoyuan International Airport
(Japan) Vanilla Air	(Japan) Narita International Airport
(India) Vistara	(India) Indira Gandhi International Airport
Viva Macau	Macau International Airport
(Kuwait) Wataniya Airways	Kuwait International Airport
Wings of Lebanon	(Lebanon) Beirut-Rafic Hariri International Airport
(United Arab Emirates) Wizz Air Abu Dhabi	(United Arab Emirates) Abu Dhabi International Airport
(Indonesia) Xpress Air	(Indonesia) Raja Haji Fisabilillah Airport
(China) Ying'an Airlines	(China) Guiyang Longdongbao International Airport
(Iraq) Zagrosjet	(Iraq) Erbil International Airport
(India) Zooom Air	(India) Indira Gandhi International Airport

== Oceania ==
=== Defunct airlines ===
Airline	Hub airport
Air Australia	(Australia) Brisbane Airport (Australia) Melbourne Airport
Ansett Australia	(Australia) Adelaide Airport (Australia) Brisbane Airport (Australia) Cairns Airport (Australia) Canberra Airport (Australia) Hobart Airport (Australia) Melbourne Airport (Australia) Perth Airport (Australia) Sydney Airport
(Australia) Australian Airlines	(Australia) Cairns Airport (Australia) Sydney Airport
(Guam) Continental Micronesia	(Guam) Antonio B. Won Pat International Airport
Trans Australia Airlines	(Australia) Essendon Fields Airport (Melbourne) (Australia) Melbourne Airport
