= List of defunct airlines of South Korea =

This is a list of defunct airlines of South Korea.

| Airline | Image | IATA | ICAO | Callsign | Commenced operations | Ceased operations | Notes |
|---|---|---|---|---|---|---|---|
| Air Century | | | | | 1967 | 1971 | |
| Air Philip | | 3P | APV | PHILIP AIR | 2018 | 2019 | |
| Air Pohang | | AB | KAB | AIR POHANG | 2018 | 2018 | |
| Air Ulsan | | | | | | 2015 | Never launched |
| Asiana Airlines Cargo | | AAR | OZ | ASIANA | 1988 | 2025 | Merged into AirZeta |
| East Asia AirLine | | KX | EAA | East Asia AirLine | 2010 | 2012 | |
| Fly Gangwon | | 4V | FGW | GANGWON | 2019 | 2023 | After acquired by Winix, rebranded as Parata Airlines |
| Hansung Airlines | | HS | HAN | | 2005 | 2008 | Rebranded as T'way Air |
| Hi Air | | 4H | HGG | HI AIR | 2019 | 2023 | |
| Incheon Tiger Airways | | | | | 2007 | 2008 | Never launched |
| Korean Aviation | | | | | 1926 | 1947 | Renamed/merged to Korean National Airlines |
| Korean National Airlines | | | | | 1948 | 1962 | Nationalized and rebranded as Korean Air Lines |
| Korean Air Lines | | KE | KAL | | 1962 | 1984 | Rebranded as Korean Air |
| Korea Express Air | | KW | KEA | Korea Express Air | 2009 | 2020 | |
| Kostar Air | | XE | KSA | Kostar Air | 2008 | 2009 | Never launched |
| Prime Air | | | | | | 2017 | Never launched |
| uSKY Air | | | | | | 2016 | Never launched and rebranded as Prime Air |
| Yeongnam Air | | OE | ONA | YEONGNAM AIR | 2008 | 2008 | |

== See also ==
- List of airlines of South Korea
