= Atrak =

Atrak may refer to:

- A-Trak (born 1982), Canadian musician
- Atrek River, a river in Iran
- Atrak Rural District (disambiguation), administrative subdivisions of Iran
- Atrak Air, an Iranian Airline

== See also ==
Adaptive Transform Acoustic Coding (ATRAC)
