= List of airlines of Korea =

For a list of airlines of South Korea and North Korea, respectively, see:

- List of airlines of South Korea
- List of airlines of North Korea
