= HPY =

HPY may refer to:

- Baytown Airport, in Texas, United States
- Happy Air, a defunct Thai airline
- Heartland Payment Systems, a subsidiary of Global Payments
- Helsingfors telefonförening, now Elisa, a Finnish telecommunications company
