= Korea Express Air =

Airline of South Korea

Korea Express Air 코리아 익스프레스 에어
IATA	ICAO	Call sign
KW	KEA	Korea Express Air
- Founded: 2005
- Commenced operations: August 15, 2009; 4 February 2016 - Relaunched; 21 February 2020
- Ceased operations: 28 March 2015; 31 December 2019; 28 May 2020
- Hubs: Yangyang International Airport
- Fleet size: 2
- Destinations: 4
- Headquarters: Gomseom-ro, Nam-Myeon, Taean, South Chungcheong Province, South Korea
- Website: keair.co.kr

Korea Express Air (KEA) was an air taxi airline, with its head office in Nam-myeon (KO), Taean, South Chungcheong Province, and with flight operations based in Yangyang International Airport.

== Destinations ==
Country	City	Airport	Notes	Refs
Japan	Kitakyushu	Kitakyushu Airport	Suspended	
South Korea	Busan	Gimhae International Airport	Suspended	
South Korea	Jeju	Jeju International Airport	Suspended	
South Korea	Yangyang	Yangyang International Airport	Hub	

== Fleet ==
As of August 2025, Korea Express Air operates the following aircraft:

Korea Express Air fleet
Aircraft	In Fleet	Order	Seats	Notes
Beechcraft 1900D	1	0		
Embraer ERJ-145/ER	1	0	50	

== See also ==
- Transport in South Korea
- List of companies of South Korea
- List of airlines of South Korea
- List of airports in South Korea
