= Air Pohang =

South Korean airline

Air Pohang 에어포항

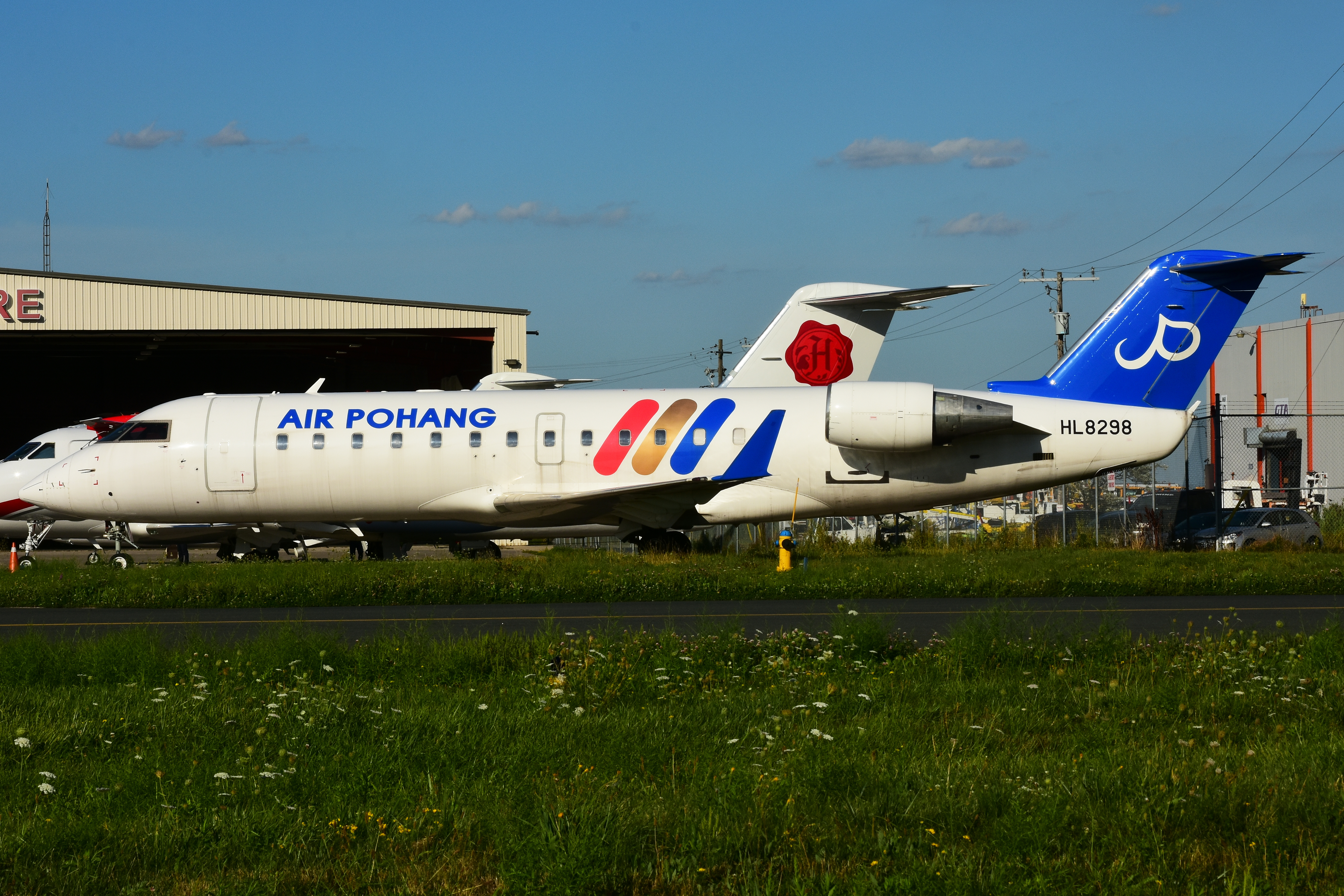
IATA	ICAO	Call sign
AB	KAB	AIR POHANG
- Commenced operations: 7 February 2018
- Ceased operations: 29 Nov 2018
- Operating bases: Pohang Airport
- Fleet size: 1 (November 2018)
- Destinations: 3 (February 2018)
- Headquarters: Pohang, South Korea
- Website: www.airpohang.kr

Notes
- ICAO code source: Ch-aviation

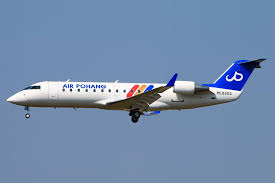
An Air Pohang Bombardier CRJ-200 landing

Air Pohang (Korean: 에어포항) was a South Korean domestic low-cost airline that launched operations in February 2018. As indicated by its name, the company focused on serving residents of Pohang, a city on the southeastern coast of the peninsula, as well as the rest of North Gyeongsang Province. As of February 2018, the airline flew to two destinations from its base at Pohang Airport using three CRJ-200 aircraft. The airline ceased all operations on 29 November 2018.

== History ==
Air Pohang was founded by the company Dong-Hwa Electronics, which made an initial investment of 10 billion won. The airline commenced operations on 7 February 2018, with a flight from Gimpo Airport in Seoul to Pohang Airport. It thus became the seventh low-cost carrier based in South Korea.

== Destinations ==
The following destinations were served:

Country	City	Airport	Notes	Refs
South Korea	Jeju	Jeju International Airport		
South Korea	Pohang	Pohang Airport	Hub	
South Korea	Seoul	Gimpo International Airport		

== Fleet ==
Before it ceased operations, the company operated two CRJ-200 aircraft that each seated 50 passengers.

Air Pohang fleet
Aircraft	In fleet	Order	Seats	Notes
Bombardier CRJ-200ER	1	0	50	

== See also ==
- List of defunct airlines of South Korea
