= Air Philip =

South Korean airline

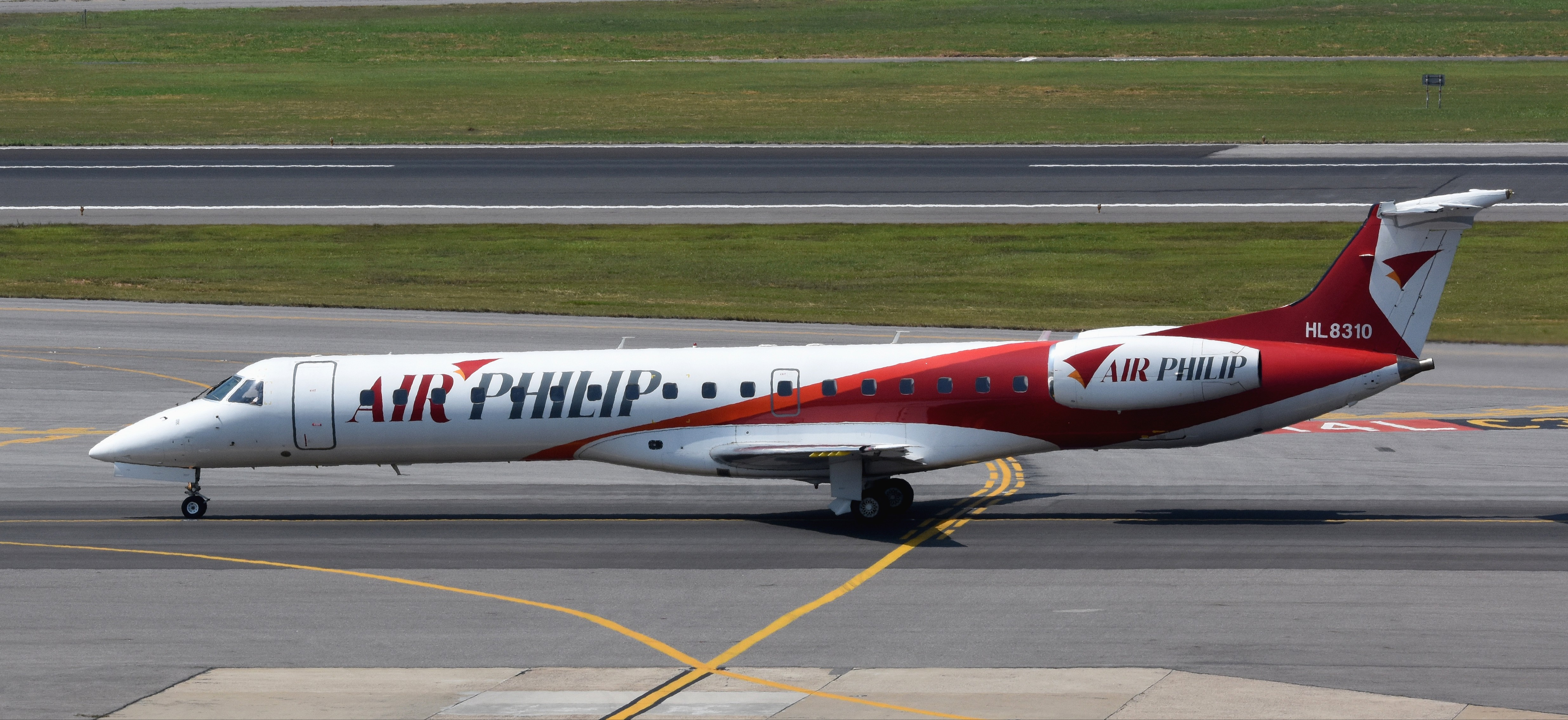
IATA	ICAO	Call sign
3P	APV	PHILIP AIR
- Founded: December 2016
- Commenced operations: June 30, 2018
- Ceased operations: March 13, 2019
- Hubs: Gwangju; Muan
- Fleet size: 2
- Destinations: 6
- Website: www.airphilip.com

Air Philip was a short-lived South Korean airline. It flew on domestic as well as international routes. The main office was in Muan County while the company governor (지사) was in Seoul. As of March 13, 2019, Air Philip ended all of its flights and ceased operation.

== History ==
On November 28, 2018, the airline flew its first international flight, from Muan to Vladivostok. In February 2019, the airline suspended all international flights, whilst their remaining domestic operations ended in March 2019.

== Destinations ==
As of February 2019, Air Philip flew to the following destinations:

Country	City	Airport	Notes	Refs
Japan	Okinawa	Naha Airport	Terminated	
Russia	Vladivostok	Vladivostok International Airport	Terminated	
South Korea	Gwangju	Gwangju Airport	Hub	
South Korea	Jeju	Jeju International Airport		
South Korea	Muan	Muan International Airport	Hub	
South Korea	Seoul	Gimpo International Airport		
South Korea	Seoul	Incheon International Airport	Terminated	

== Fleet ==
As of December 2018, Air Philip operated the following aircraft:

Air Philip fleet
Aircraft	In service	Orders	Passengers	Notes
Embraer ERJ-145EP	2	—	50	
Total	2	—		

== See also ==
- List of defunct airlines of South Korea
- Transport in South Korea
