= Parata Air =

Airline of South Korea

IATA	ICAO	Call sign
WE	PTA	PARATA AIR
- Founded: 12 April 2016; 10 years ago
- Commenced operations: 22 November 2019; 6 years ago
- Operating bases: Incheon International Airport
- Focus cities: Yangyang International Airport
- Fleet size: 4(+1)
- Destinations: 8
- Parent company: Winix
- Headquarters: Yangyang, South Korea
- Website: www.parataair.com

Parata Air (Korean: 파라타 항공), formerly Fly Yangyang and Fly Gangwon, is a South Korean low-cost airline. The carrier has announced plans to resume domestic services between Gimpo, Jeju, and Yangyang in August 2025. It also intends to launch international flights from Incheon to destinations in Japan, Vietnam, and the United States.

== History ==
=== Founding ===
Fly Gangwon was originally established as Fly Yangyang in November 2016 and signed the Convention on Support for Air Transport Business with Gangwon State.

In October 2017, Fly Yangyang changed its name to Fly Gangwon and signed a lease for 3 Boeing 737-800. Fly Gangwon received its Air Operator's Certificate in 2019, and relocated its headquarters to Yangyang County, home to Yangyang International Airport. In November, Fly Gangwon began flights to Jeju. In December, Fly Gangwon launched flights to Taipei–Taoyuan, its first international destination.

=== Financial crisis ===
Fly Gangwon expanded its domestic and international network, but due to COVID-19 pandemic, Fly Gangwon got into financial difficulties. In December, Gangwon State Council financial committee approves a financial support of 6 billion won to Fly Gangwon to recover its operation, including receiving Air Cargo Transport Certificate and signing for introducing widebody aircraft, Airbus A330-200 and Airbus A330-200F.

In May 2023, Fly Gangwon suspended all its operations and applied for bankruptcy protection. Since the filing for bankruptcy protection, Fly Gangwon's Air Operation Certificate validation has been suspended. In November, Fly Gangwon returns its last aircraft to the lessor, and announces the main bidding in December with conducting the diligence of 3 Letter of Intent(LOI)s.

=== Rehabilitation ===
In June 2024, the rehabilitation court announced that Winix, a Korean household appliances company, was chosen as the final prospective acquirer of Fly Gangwon. Winix held a meeting with creditors and shareholders that month to approve the M&A rehabilitation plan, and completed the acquisition after the court's approval. Following the court's decision, the airline was rebranded from Fly Gangwon to Parata Airlines. Parata Airlines operates with strategic bases not only at Incheon International Airport and Gimpo International Airport, but also at Yangyang International Airport. The airline is pursuing a multi-route strategy that includes both domestic and international routes to ensure stable operations and long-term profitability.

== Destinations ==
Parata Air operates the following destinations, and some of were operated by Fly Gangwon before the bankruptcy protection:

Country	City	Airport	Notes	Refs
China	Shenzhen	Shenzhen Bao'an International Airport		
Japan	Osaka	Kansai International Airport		
Japan	Sapporo	New Chitose Airport		
Japan	Tokyo	Narita International Airport		
Philippines	Clark	Clark International Airport	Terminated	
South Korea	Jeju	Jeju International Airport		
South Korea	Seoul	Gimpo International Airport		
South Korea	Seoul	Incheon International Airport		
South Korea	Yangyang	Yangyang International Airport	Hub	
South Korea	Yeosu	Yeosu Airport	Terminated	
Taiwan	Taichung	Taichung International Airport	Terminated	
Taiwan	Taipei	Taoyuan International Airport	Terminated	
United States	Los Angeles	Los Angeles International Airport	Begins 1 May 2027	
Vietnam	Da Nang	Da Nang International Airport		
Vietnam	Hanoi	Noi Bai International Airport		
Vietnam	Ho Chi Minh City	Tan Son Nhat International Airport	Terminated	
Vietnam	Nha Trang	Cam Ranh International Airport		
Vietnam	Phu Quoc	Phu Quoc International Airport		

== Fleet ==
=== Current fleet ===
As of September 2025, Parata Air operates the following aircraft:

Parata Air fleet
Aircraft	In service	Orders	Passengers				Notes
Aircraft	In service	Orders	C	Y+	Y	Total	Notes
Airbus A320-200	2	—	—	12	156	168	Deliveries in September 2025.
Airbus A320-200	2	—	—	—	174	174	Deliveries in September 2025.
Airbus A330-200	3	—	18	—	242	260	Deliveries in August 2025.
Airbus A330-200	3	—	—	49	245	294	Deliveries in August 2025.
Total	5	—					

=== Retired fleet ===
Parata Air's predecessor, Fly Gangwon had operated the following aircraft, during its seven-year existence:

Aircraft	Total	Introduced	Retired	Notes
Airbus A330-200	1	2022	2023	
Boeing 737-800	5	2019	2023	
