= Atrak Rural District =

Atrak Rural District (Persian: دهستان اترك) may refer to:

- Atrak Rural District (Golestan Province)
- Atrak Rural District (North Khorasan Province)
