= Atrak Air =

Iranian airline (2014–2018)

IATA	ICAO	Call sign
AK	ATR	ATRAK AIR
- Founded: 1993
- Commenced operations: 26 January 2014
- Ceased operations: 2018
- Hubs: Bojnord Airport
- Focus cities: Mehrabad International Airport; Mashhad International Airport
- Fleet size: 3
- Destinations: 11
- Headquarters: Ekbatan Town, Tehran, Iran
- Website: www.atrakair.com

Atrak Air (Persian: هواپیمایی اترک, Havâpeymâyi-ye Âtrak) was a scheduled airline based at Mehrabad International Airport, Tehran, Iran.

== History ==
Atrak Air was founded in 1993 with its headquarters in Ekbatan Town, Tehran, Iran. The airline finally commenced service in 2013 with flights to three destinations with further services being added since. Initially the airline planned to use a Khors Aircompany A320. It first own aircraft was added in the end of 2013. In 2016 the airline bought 6 aircraft. The airline scrapped an agreement with Iran Airtour in 2018. As of summer 2018, Atrak Air suspended its operations.

== Destinations ==
As of March 2017, Atrak Air flew to the following destinations in Iran:

Province	Destination	Airport	Notes
Hormozgan	Kish	Kish International Airport	—
Isfahan	Isfahan	Isfahan International Airport	—
Kermanshah	Kermanshah	Kermanshah Airport	—
Khuzestan	Abadan	Abadan International Airport	—
Khuzestan	Ahvaz	Ahvaz International Airport	—
North Khorasan	Bojnord	Bojnord Airport	—
Razavi Khorasan	Mashhad	Mashhad International Airport	—
Tehran	Tehran	Mehrabad International Airport	Base

== Fleet ==
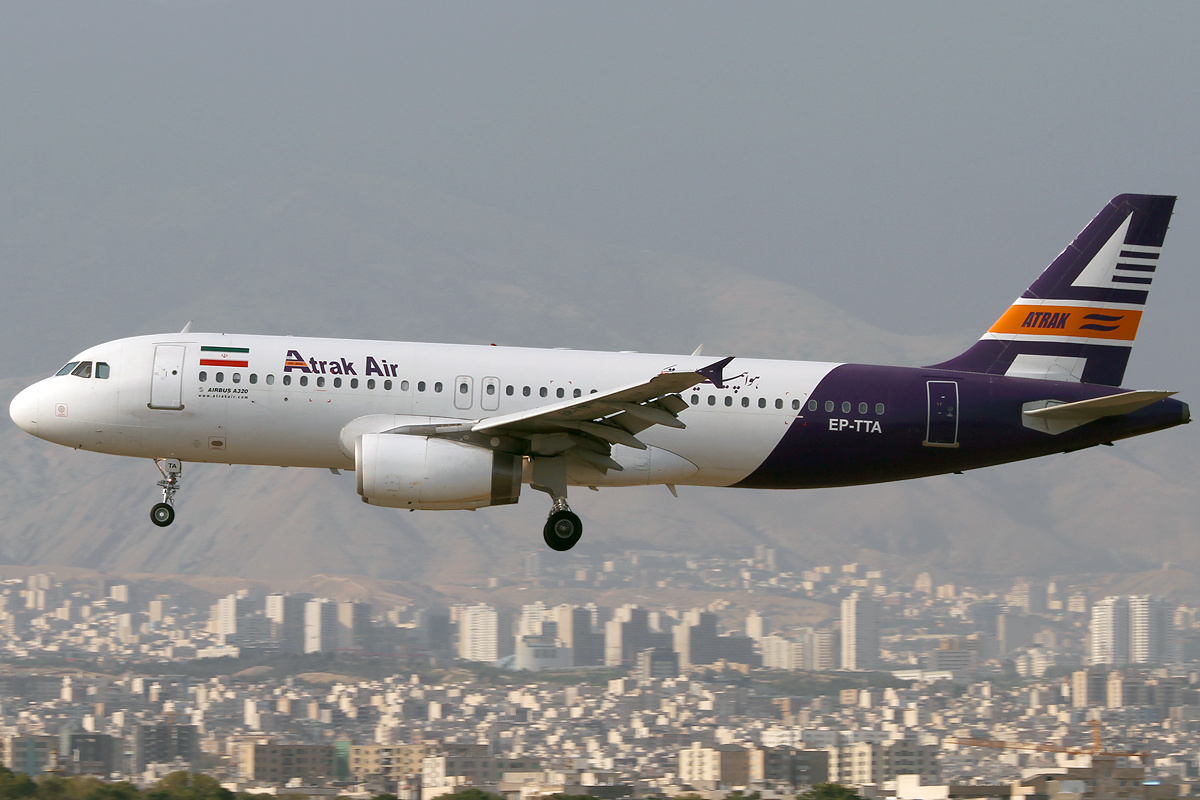
Atrak Air Airbus A320-200

As of August 2017 Atrak Air operated the following aircraft:

Atrak Air fleet
Aircraft	In service	Orders	Passengers			Notes
Aircraft	In service	Orders	C	Y	Total	Notes
Airbus A320-200	3	—	12	144	166	
Total	3	—				

== See also ==
- List of airlines of Iran
