= List of airlines of South Korea =

This is a list of airlines currently operating in South Korea.

== Scheduled airlines ==
| Airline | Image | ICAO | IATA | Callsign | Base | Commenced operations | Alliance | Notes |
|---|---|---|---|---|---|---|---|---|
| Aero K | | EOK | RF | AEROHANGUK | Cheongju International Airport | 2021 | None | |
| Air Busan | | ABL | BX | AIR BUSAN | Gimhae International Airport | 2008 | None | Asiana Airlines subsidiary Will be integrated into Jin Air |
| Air Premia | | APZ | YP | AIRPREMIA | Incheon International Airport | 2021 | None | |
| Air Seoul | | ASV | RS | AIR SEOUL | Incheon International Airport | 2016 | None | Asiana Airlines subsidiary Will be integrated into Jin Air |
| Asiana Airlines | | AAR | OZ | ASIANA | Gimpo International Airport; Incheon International Airport | 1988 | Star Alliance | Merged with Korean Air in 2024; Korean Air subsidiary Will be integrated into Korean Air |
| Eastar Jet | | ESR | ZE | EASTARJET | Gimpo International Airport | 2009 | U-FLY Alliance | |
| Jeju Air | | JJA | 7C | JEJU AIR | Jeju International Airport; Incheon International Airport | 2005 | Value Alliance | Founding member of Value Alliance |
| Jin Air | | JNA | LJ | JIN AIR | Gimpo International Airport; Incheon International Airport | 2008 | None | Korean Air subsidiary |
| Korean Air | | KAL | KE | KOREANAIR | Gimpo International Airport; Incheon International Airport | 1969 | SkyTeam | Founding member of SkyTeam |
| Parata Air | | PTA | WE | PARATA AIR | Yangyang International Airport | 2025 | None | Formerly Fly Gangwon |
| SUM Air | | XUM | XU | AWESUMAIR | Sacheon Airport | 2026 | None | |
| Trinity Airways | | TWB | TW | SONOROUS | Gimpo International Airport | 2004 | None | Formerly Hansung Airlines and T'way Air |

== Cargo airlines ==
| Airline | Image | ICAO | IATA | Callsign | Base | Commenced operations | Alliance | Notes |
|---|---|---|---|---|---|---|---|---|
| AirZeta | | AIH | KJ | QUANTUM SKY | Incheon International Airport | 2013 | None | Formerly Air Incheon. Rebranded to AirZeta on 1 August 2025. |
| Korean Air Cargo | | KAL | KE | KOREANAIR | Gimpo International Airport; Incheon International Airport | 1962 | SkyTeam Cargo | Founding member of SkyTeam Cargo |

== See also ==
- List of defunct airlines of South Korea
- List of airports in South Korea
- List of busiest airports in South Korea by passenger traffic
- List of airlines
