= Happy Air =

Domestic airline of Thailand (2009–2015)

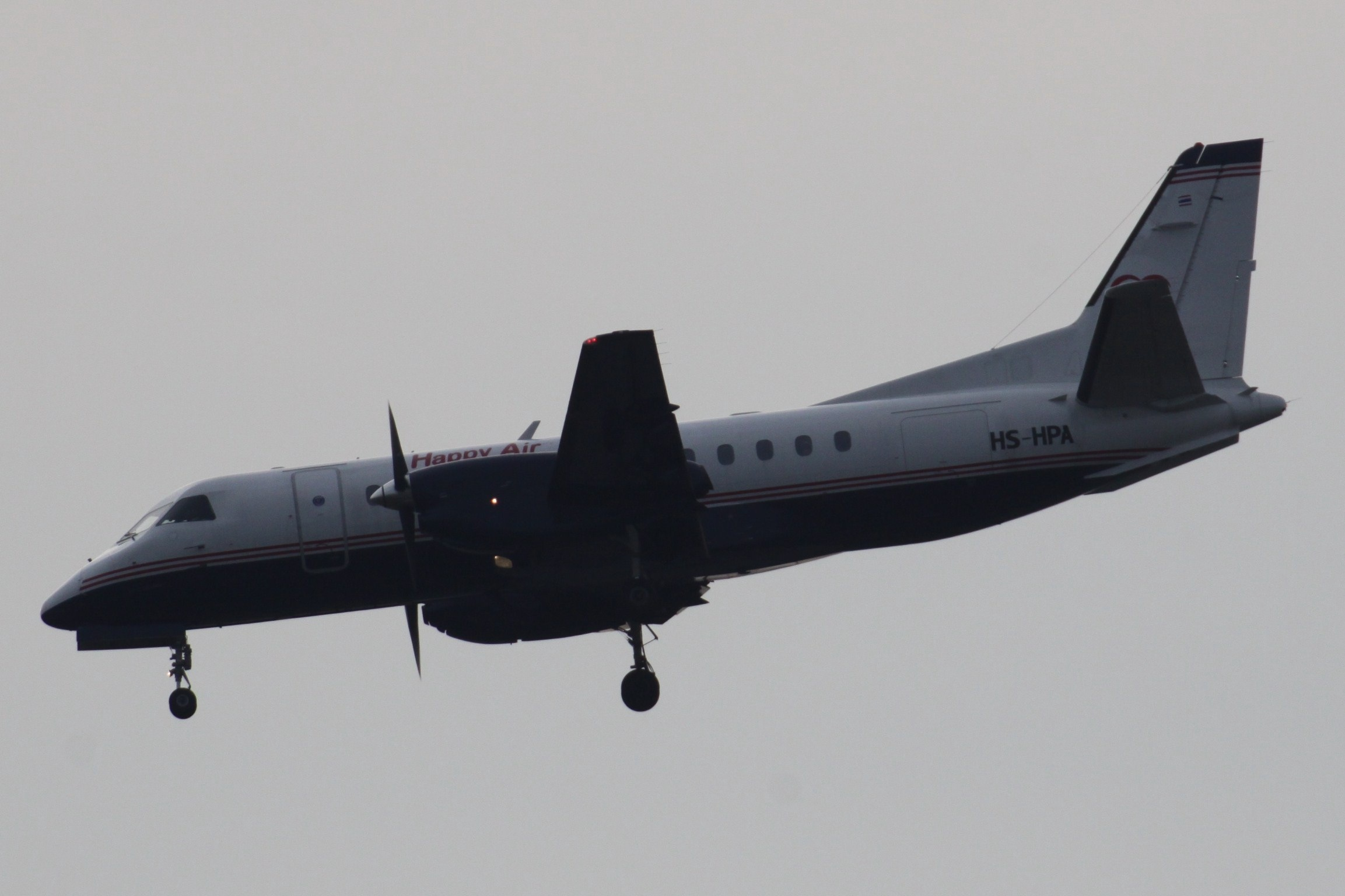
IATA	ICAO	Call sign
—	HPY	HAPPY TRAVEL
- Founded: 3 April 2009
- Ceased operations: February 2015
- Operating bases: Suvarnabhumi Airport
- Fleet size: 1
- Destinations: 3
- Key people: Wiboon Piyapanyawongse (CEO)

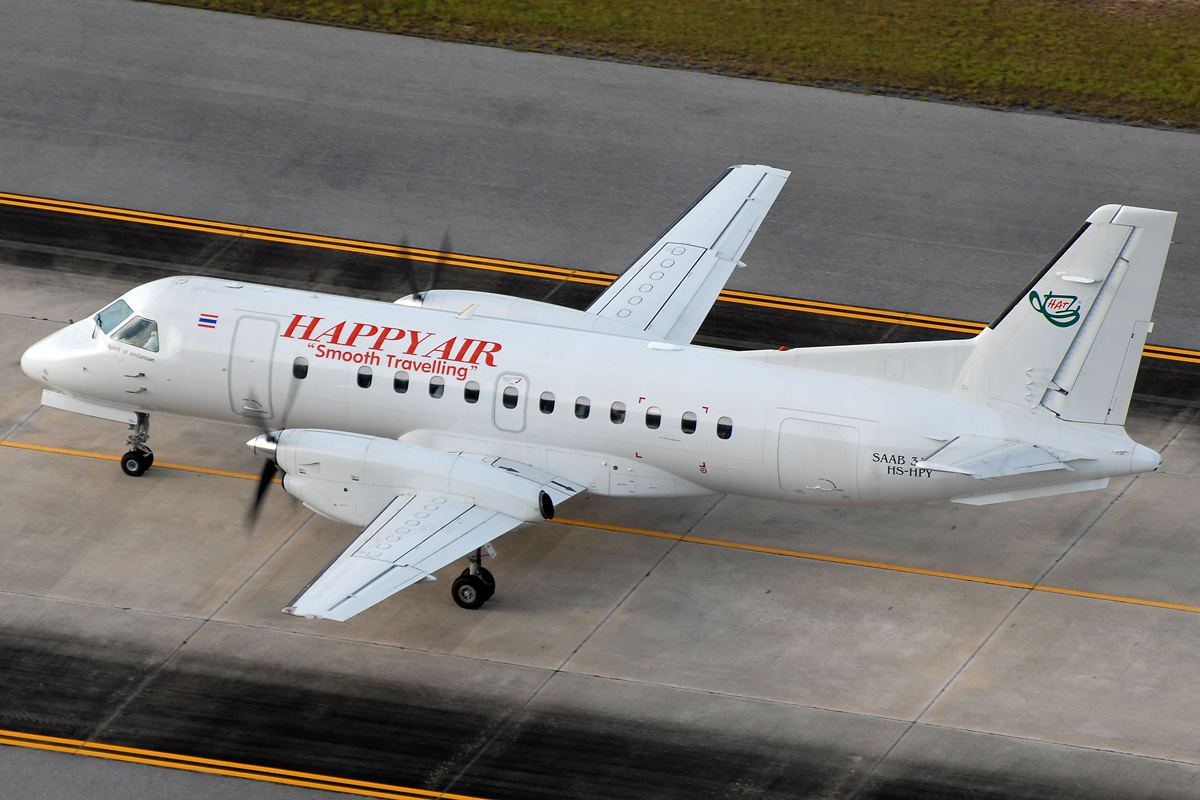
Happy Air Saab 340A

Happy Air (Thai: แฮปปี้แอร์), legally Happy Air Travellers Co., Ltd., was a small airline based in Thailand, offering scheduled domestic passenger flights out of Suvarnabhumi Airport, Bangkok, as well as charter services. It was founded on 3 April 2009 and ceased operations in February 2015.

== Destinations ==
Happy Air offered scheduled flights from Bangkok to Chumphon and Ranong as well as charter services.

== Fleet ==
Happy Air operated four Saab 340 with an age of 17 years.
