= Airline hub =

Type of airport

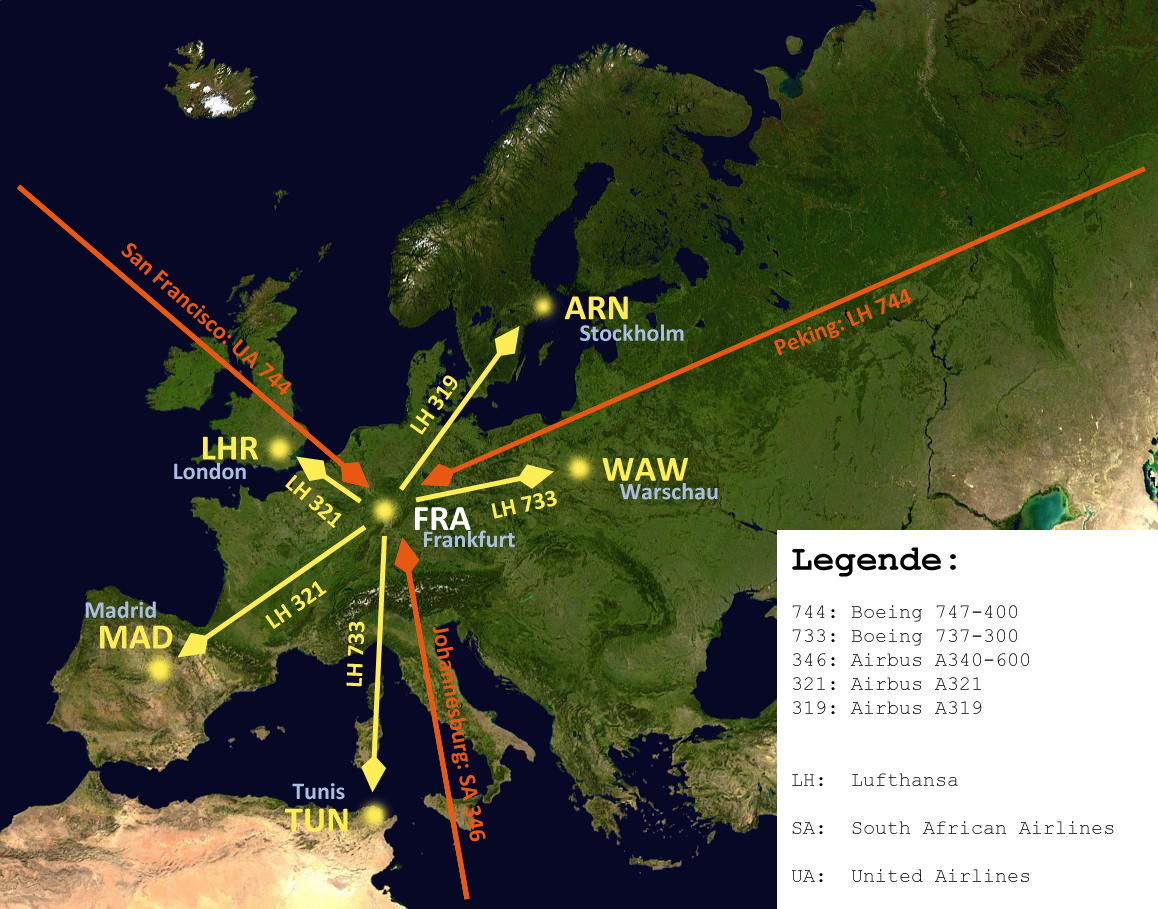
Passengers flying on Lufthansa and its Star Alliance partners may connect through Frankfurt Airport, Lufthansa's main hub.

An airline hub or hub airport is an airport used by one or more airlines to concentrate passenger traffic and flight operations. Hubs serve as transfer (or stop-over) points to help get passengers to their final destination. (Note: Colloquially, an airline hub may be defined as an airport that receives many passengers or as an airport that serves as the operating base of an airline, whether or not the airline allows for connecting traffic.) (Note: The Federal Aviation Administration of the United States defines a hub in terms of passenger enplanements. Specifically, a hub is an airport that handles 0.05% or more of the nation's annual passenger boardings.) It is part of the hub-and-spoke system. An airline may operate flights from several non-hub (spoke) cities to the hub airport, and passengers traveling between spoke cities connect through the hub. This paradigm creates economies of scale that allow an airline to serve (via an intermediate connection) city-pairs that could otherwise not be economically served non-stop. This system contrasts with the point-to-point model, in which there are no hubs and nonstop flights are instead offered between spoke cities. Hub airports also serve origin and destination (O&D) traffic.

== Operations ==
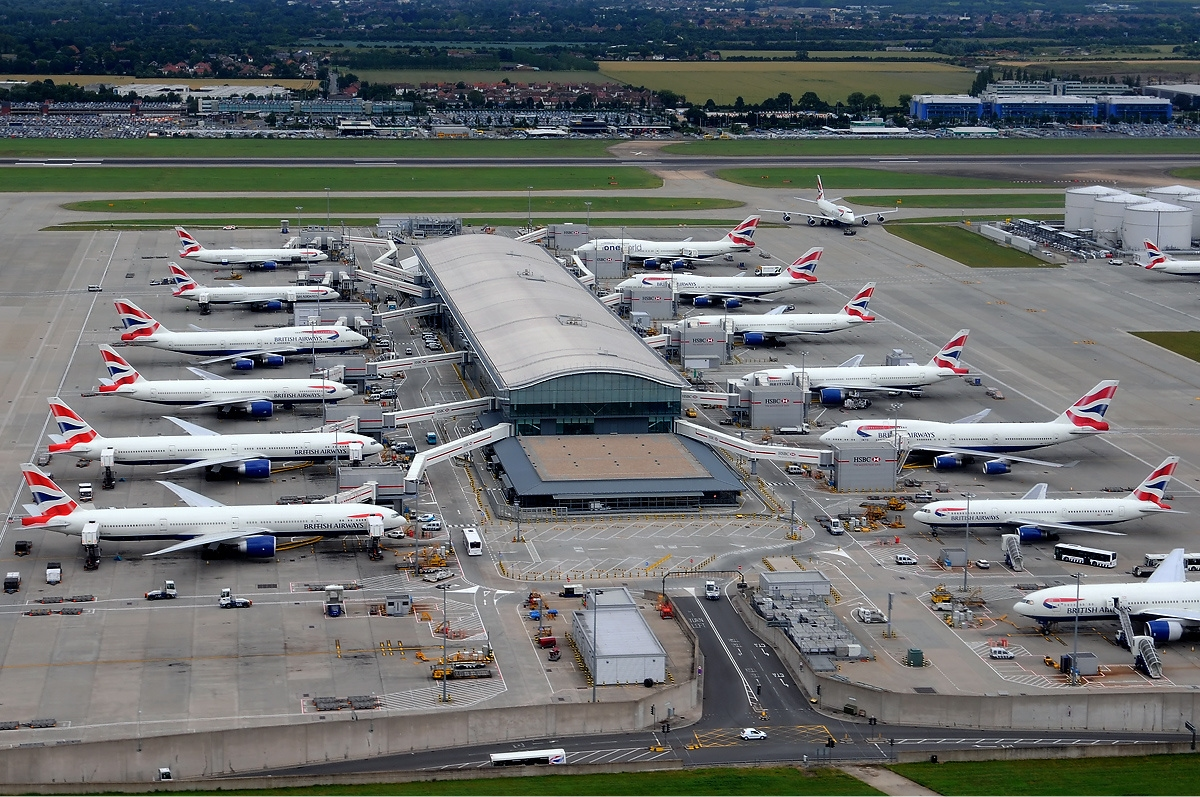
The primary hub of British Airways is Heathrow Airport in London.

The hub-and-spoke system allows an airline to serve the same number of destinations with fewer routes, so fewer aircraft are needed. The system can also increase the passenger load factor and facilitate larger and more efficient aircraft. A flight from a hub to a spoke carries not just passengers originating at the hub, but also passengers originating at multiple spoke cities. Additional employees and facilities are needed at the hub to cater to connecting passengers. To serve spoke cities of varying populations and demand, an airline requires several aircraft types, and specific training and equipment are necessary for each type. In addition, airlines may experience capacity constraints as they expand at their hub airports.

For the passenger, the hub-and-spoke system offers one-stop air service to a wide array of destinations. The downside is having to make a connection, which increases travel time compared to a direct flight. Additionally, airlines can come to monopolise their hubs (fortress hubs), allowing them to freely increase fares as passengers have no alternative. High domestic connectivity in the United States is achieved through airport location and hub dominance. The top 10 megahubs in the US are dominated by American Airlines, Delta Air Lines, and United Airlines, three of the four largest United States–based airlines.

=== Banking ===
Airlines may operate banks of flights at their hubs, in which several flights arrive and depart within short periods of time. The banks may be known as "peaks" of activity at the hubs and the non-banks as "valleys". Banking allows for short connection times for passengers. However, an airline must assemble many resources to cater to the influx of flights during a bank, and having several aircraft on the ground at the same time can lead to congestion and delays. In addition, banking could result in inefficient aircraft utilisation, with aircraft waiting at spoke cities for the next bank.

Instead, some airlines have debanked their hubs, introducing a "rolling hub" in which flight arrivals and departures are spread throughout the day. This phenomenon is also known as "depeaking". While costs may decrease, connection times are longer at a rolling hub. American Airlines was the first to depeak its hubs, trying to improve profitability following the September 11 attacks. It rebanked its hubs in 2015, however, feeling the gain in connecting passengers would outweigh the rise in costs.

For example, the hub of Qatar Airways in Doha Airport has 471 daily movements to 140 destinations by March 2020 with an average of 262 seats per movement; in three main waves: 05:00–09:00 (132 movements), 16:00–21:00 (128) and 23:00–03:00 (132), allowing around 30 million connecting passengers in 2019.

== History ==
=== United States ===
Before the US airline industry was deregulated in 1978, most airlines operated under the point-to-point system (with a notable exception being Pan Am). The Civil Aeronautics Board dictated which routes an airline could fly. At the same time, however, some airlines began to experiment with the hub-and-spoke system. Delta Air Lines was the first to implement such a system, providing service to remote spoke cities from its Atlanta hub. After deregulation, many airlines quickly established hub-and-spoke route networks of their own.

US major top 30 airports, thousands of departing passengers, 2024
Airport	2024 pax.	American	Delta	United	Southwest
Atlanta	52,510	984	38,660	853	3,839
Dallas/Fort Worth	42,390	28,451	1,420	984	0
Chicago–O'Hare	38,620	8,048	1,296	14,477	777
Los Angeles	37,864	5,238	6,341	5,481	3,312
Denver	37,840	1,262	1,726	15,585	12,524
New York–JFK	31,304	3,224	7,817	0	0
Charlotte	28,508	19,857	555	453	393
Las Vegas	28,024	2,181	2,498	2,034	10,552
Orlando	27,839	2,181	2,498	2,034	10,552
Miami	26,454	15,174	1,791	898	736
Phoenix–Sky Harbor	25,573	8,411	1,703	1,441	8,342
Seattle/Tacoma (Note: Alaska Airlines: 11.4)	25,428	936	5,128	1,274	1,079
San Francisco	25,129	1,653	1,943	10,732	984
Newark	24,553	1,034	814	14,282	0
Houston–Intercontinental	23,377	961	963	13,093	298
Boston	21,217	2,456	4,300	1,765	932
Minneapolis/St. Paul	18,018	627	10,567	657	859
Fort Lauderdale	17,050	960	1,992	1,173	1,950
New York–LaGuardia	16,714	2,137	3,776	1,024	1,627
Detroit	16,083	712	9,050	246	516
Philadelphia	15,082	7,536	834	558	680
Salt Lake City	13,529	607	7,838	506	1,469
Baltimore	13,159	532	778	502	9,331
Washington DC–Dulles	13,065	113	376	6,623	164
San Diego	12,752	1,497	1,524	1,543	3,991
Washington DC–Reagan	12,733	3,463	1,200	732	1,855
Tampa	12,043	1,790	2,050	1,213	2,992
Nashville	12,035	1,102	1,155	762	6,326
Austin	10,664	1,926	1,444	1,179	4,418
Chicago–Midway	10,391	0	150	0	9,241

=== Middle East ===
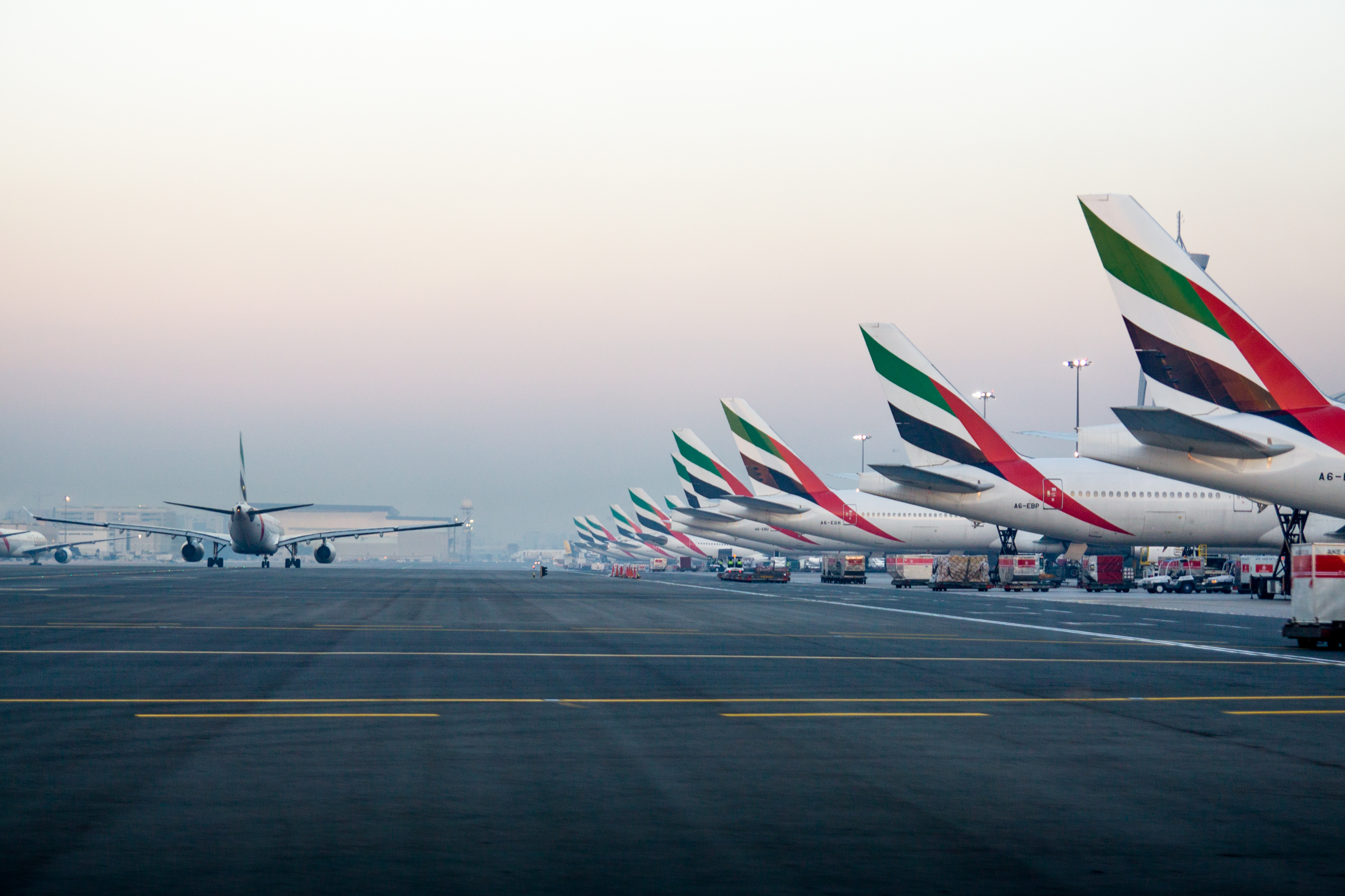
Emirates aircraft at Dubai International Airport

In 1974, the governments of Bahrain, Oman, Qatar and the United Arab Emirates took control of Gulf Air from the British Overseas Airways Corporation (BOAC). Gulf Air became the flag carrier of the four Middle Eastern nations. It linked Oman, Qatar and the UAE to its Bahrain hub, from which it offered flights to destinations throughout Europe and Asia. In the UAE, Gulf Air focused on Abu Dhabi rather than Dubai, contrary to the aspirations of UAE Prime Minister Mohammed bin Rashid Al Maktoum to transform the latter into a world-class metropolis. Sheikh Mohammed proceeded to establish a new airline based in Dubai, Emirates, which launched operations in 1985.

Elsewhere in the Middle East region, Qatar and Oman decided to create their own airlines as well. Qatar Airways and Oman Air were both founded in 1993, with hubs at Doha and Muscat respectively. As the new airlines grew, their home nations relied less on Gulf Air to provide air service. Qatar withdrew its share in Gulf Air in 2002. In 2003, the UAE formed another national airline, Etihad Airways, which is based in Abu Dhabi. The country exited Gulf Air in 2006, and Oman followed in 2007. Gulf Air therefore became fully owned by the government of Bahrain.

Emirates, Qatar Airways, Saudia and Etihad Airways have since established large hubs at their respective home airports. The hubs, which benefit from their proximity to large population centres, have become popular stopover points on trips between Europe and Asia, for example. Their rapid growth has impacted the development of traditional hubs, such as London-Heathrow, Paris-Charles de Gaulle, and New York-JFK.

== Types of hubs ==
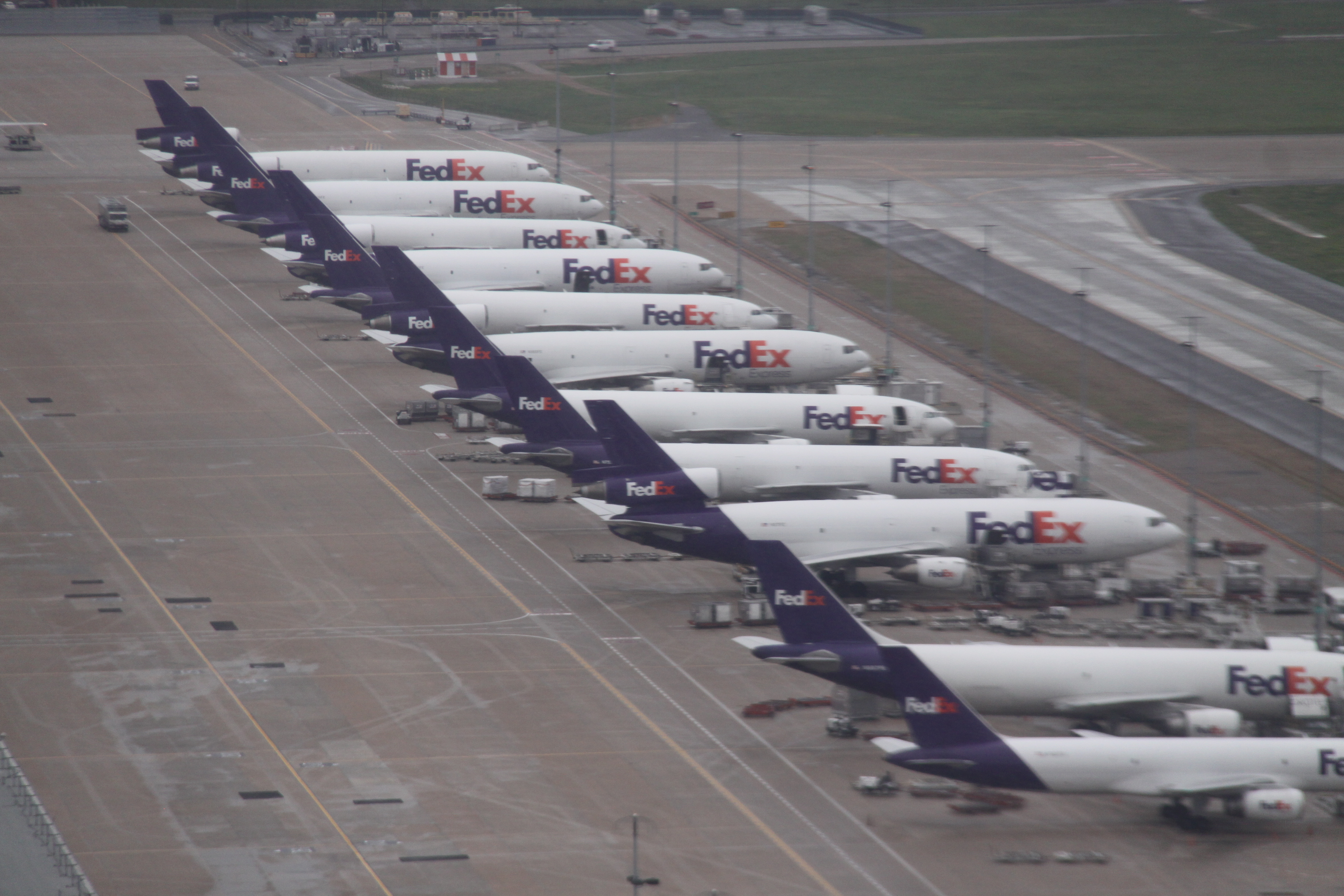
FedEx Express aircraft at Memphis International Airport

=== Cargo hubs and scissor hubs ===
A cargo hub is an airport that primarily is operated by a cargo airline that uses the hub-and-spoke system. In the United States, two of the largest cargo hub airports, FedEx's Memphis Superhub and UPS Louisville Worldport, are close to the mean center of the United States population. FedEx's airline, FedEx Express, established its Memphis hub in 1973, prior to the deregulation of the air cargo industry in the United States. The system has created an efficient delivery system for the airline. UPS Airlines has followed a similar pattern in Louisville. In Europe, ASL Airlines, Cargolux and DHL Aviation follow a similar strategy and operate their primary hubs at Liège, Luxembourg and Leipzig respectively.

Additionally, Ted Stevens International Airport in Anchorage, Alaska, is a frequent stop-over hub for many cargo airlines flying between Asia and North America. Most cargo airlines only stop in Anchorage for refueling and customs, but FedEx and UPS frequently use Anchorage to sort trans-pacific packages between regional hubs on each continent in addition to refueling and customs.

Passenger airlines that operate in a similar manner to the FedEx and UPS hubs are often regarded as scissor hubs, as many flights to one destination all land and deplane passengers simultaneously and, after a passenger transit period, repeat a similar process for departure to the final destination of each plane. In past, Air India operated a scissor hub at London's Heathrow Airport, where passengers from Delhi, Ahmedabad, and Mumbai could continue onto a flight to Newark. Until its grounding, Jet Airways operated a similar scissor hub at Amsterdam Airport Schiphol to transport passengers from Bangalore, Mumbai and Delhi to Toronto-Pearson and vice versa. At the peak of operations at their former scissor hub at Brussels prior to the 2016 shift to Schiphol, flights operated from Mumbai, Delhi, and Chennai and continued onward to Toronto, New York, and Newark after a near-simultaneous stopover in Brussels and vice versa. An international scissor hub could be used for third and fourth freedom flights or it could be used for fifth freedom flights, for which a precursor is a bilateral treaty between two country pairs.

WestJet used to utilize St. John's as a scissor hub during its summer schedule for flights inbound from Ottawa, Toronto, and Orlando and outbound to Dublin and London–Gatwick. Qantas similarly used to utilize Los Angeles International Airport as a scissor hub for flights inbound from Melbourne, Brisbane or Sydney, where passengers could connect onwards if traveling to New York–JFK.

=== Focus city ===
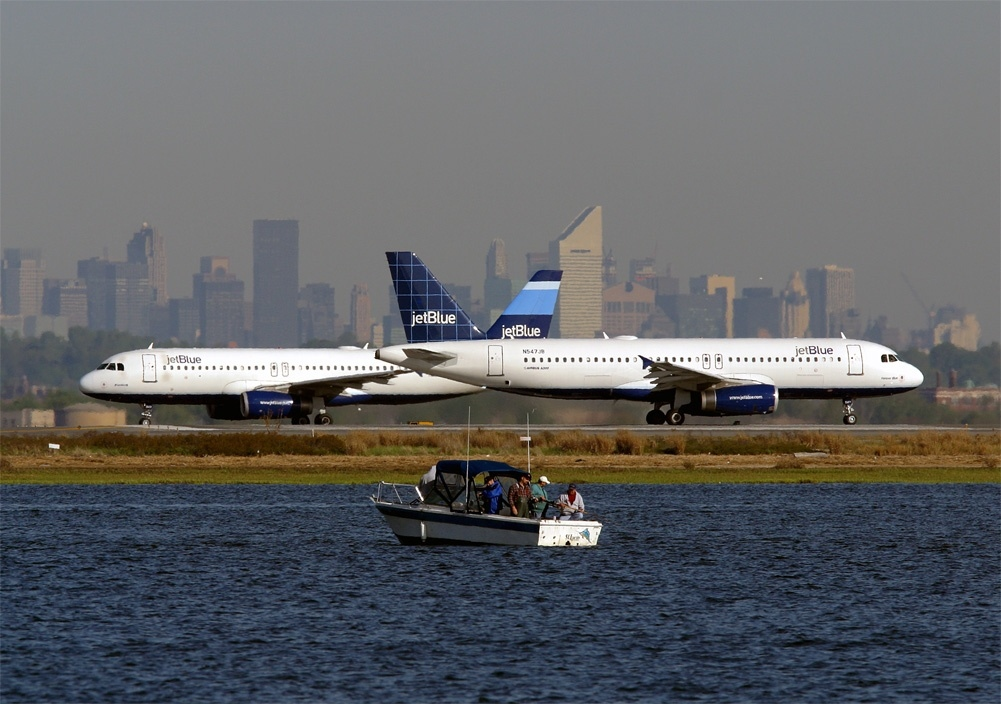
The focus cities of JetBlue are Boston, Fort Lauderdale, Los Angeles, New York–JFK, Orlando, and San Juan.

In the airline industry, a focus city is a destination from which an airline operates limited point-to-point routes. A focus city primarily caters to the local market rather than to connecting passengers.

Although the term focus city is used mainly to refer to an airport from which an airline operates limited point-to-point routes, its usage has loosely expanded to refer to a small-scale hub as well. For example, even though JetBlue's operations at New York–JFK resemble that of a hub, the airline still refers to it as a focus city.

=== Fortress hub ===
A fortress hub is an airport where a single airline dominates the market, making it challenging for competitors to establish a foothold. This term is commonly used in the United States, where the airlines with the largest fortress hubs are Delta Air Lines at Hartsfield–Jackson Atlanta International Airport, American Airlines at Dallas Fort Worth International Airport, and United Airlines at Newark Liberty International Airport.

Most national flag carriers maintain a similarly dominant presence at their countries’ primary international airport, benefiting from historical advantages and market influence. Examples include:

- Aegean Airlines in Athens
- Aeroflot at Moscow–Sheremetyevo
- Aeromexico in Mexico City
- Air Canada at Toronto–Pearson
- Air France at Paris–Charles de Gaulle
- Austrian Airlines at Vienna International Airport
- Avianca at Bogotá–El Dorado
- British Airways at London–Heathrow
- Cathay Pacific in Hong Kong
- China Airlines at Taipei–Taoyuan
- Copa Airlines in Panama City
- El Al in Ben Gurion Airport
- Emirates in Dubai
- Etihad Airways in Abu Dhabi
- Ethiopian Airlines in Addis Ababa
- Finnair in Helsinki
- Iberia in Madrid
- Icelandair in Keflavik
- Iran Air at Tehran-Imam Khomeini
- ITA Airways in Rome
- Japan Airlines at Tokyo–Haneda
- Korean Air at Seoul–Incheon
- KLM in Amsterdam
- LOT in Warsaw
- Lufthansa in Frankfurt
- Malaysia Airlines at Kuala Lumpur-International
- Qantas in Sydney
- Qatar Airways in Doha
- Singapore Airlines in Singapore
- South African Airways in Johannesburg
- Swiss International Air Lines in Zurich
- TAP Air Portugal in Lisbon
- Turkish Airlines in Istanbul

=== Primary and secondary hubs ===
A primary hub is the main hub for an airline. However, as an airline expands operations at its primary hub to the point that it experiences capacity limitations, it may elect to open secondary hubs. Examples of such hubs are Air Canada's hubs at Montréal–Trudeau and Vancouver, British Airways' hub at London–Gatwick, Air India's hub at Mumbai, Korean Air's hub at Busan and Lufthansa's hub at Munich. By operating multiple hubs, airlines can expand their geographic reach. They can also better serve spoke–spoke markets, providing more itineraries with connections at different hubs.

Cargo airlines like FedEx Express and UPS Airlines also operate secondary hubs to an extent, but these are primarily used to serve regional high-demand destinations because shipping packages through its main hub would waste fuel; an example of this would be FedEx transiting a package through Oakland International Airport when shipping packages between destinations near Seattle and Phoenix, Arizona instead of sending deliveries through the Memphis Superhub.

=== Reliever hub ===
A given hub's capacity may become exhausted or capacity shortages may occur during peak periods of the day, at which point airlines may be compelled to shift traffic to a reliever hub. A reliever hub has the potential to serve several functions for an airline: it can bypass the congested hub, it can absorb excess demand for flights that could otherwise not be scheduled at the congested hub, and it can schedule new O&D city pairs for connecting traffic.

One of the most recognized examples of this model is Delta Air Lines' and American Airlines' uses of LaGuardia Airport as a domestic hub in New York City, due to capacity and slot restrictions at their hubs at John F. Kennedy International Airport. Many regional flights operate out of LaGuardia, while most international and long-haul domestic flights remain at JFK.

Lufthansa operates a similar model of business with its hubs at Frankfurt Airport and Munich Airport. Generally speaking, a marginal majority of the airline's long-haul flights are based out of Frankfurt, while a similarly sized but smaller minority are based out of Munich.

=== Moonlight hub ===
In past history, carriers have maintained niche, time-of-day operations at hubs. The most notable was America West's use of Las Vegas as a primary night-flight hub to increase aircraft utilization rates far beyond those of competing carriers.

== See also ==
- Hidden city ticketing
- List of former airline hubs
- List of hub airports
- Point-to-point transit
- Transport hub
