= Narita International Airport =

Airport serving the Greater Tokyo Area

Narita International Airport 成田国際空港

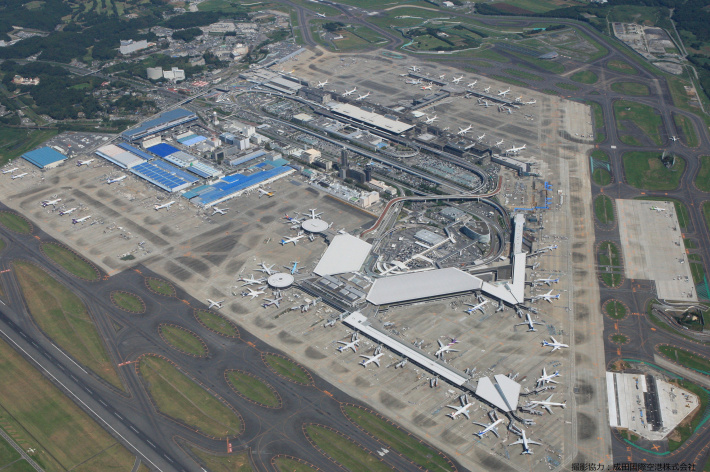
- Aerial view of NRT in 2019
- IATA: NRT; ICAO: RJAA; WMO: 47686

Summary
- Airport type: Public
- Owner/Operator: Narita International Airport Corporation (NAA)
- Serves: Greater Tokyo Area
- Location: Narita, Chiba Prefecture, Japan
- Opened: 20 May 1978; 48 years ago
- Hub for: All Nippon Airways; FedEx Express; Japan Airlines; Nippon Cargo Airlines; Polar Air Cargo
- Operating base for: Air Japan; Jetstar Japan; Peach Aviation; Spring Airlines Japan; Zipair Tokyo
- Elevation AMSL: 41 m (135 ft)
- Coordinates: 35°45′55″N 140°23′08″E
- Public transit access: Keisei Main Line, Keisei Narita Airport Line, JR Narita Line: Narita Airport Terminal 1 Station Narita Airport Terminal 2·3 Station: Keisei Higashi-Narita Line: Higashi-Narita Station
- Website: www.narita-airport.jp/en/

Maps
- Location in Chiba Prefecture Location in Japan Location in Asia
- Interactive map of Narita International Airport

Runways
Direction	Length		Surface
Direction	m	ft	Surface
16R/34L	4,000	13,123	Asphalt
16L/34R	2,500	8,202	Asphalt
Runway C	3,500	11,483	Planned

Statistics (2025)
- Passengers: 42,255,291
- Cargo (metric tonnes): 2,039,731
- Aircraft movements: 253,586
- Source: Narita International Airport Corporation

Narita International Airport (Japanese: 成田国際空港, Hepburn: Narita Kokusai Kūkō; IATA: NRT, ICAO: RJAA), originally known as New Tokyo International Airport (新東京国際空港, Shin Tōkyō Kokusai Kūkō), is an international airport serving the Greater Tokyo Area. It is located approximately 60 kilometers (37 mi; 32 nmi) east of central Tokyo in Narita, Chiba. The airport covers approximately 1,137 hectares (2,810 acres) and is undergoing expansion that will increase its total area to approximately 2,300 ha (5,700 acres).

The airport's development was highly controversial and was opposed by many local residents, with opposition continuing decades after its opening. The government's decision to construct the airport without the consent of many affected landowners led to the Sanrizuka Struggle, a prolonged series of protests against the airport's construction and land expropriation. The original plan called for five runways, but only two were ultimately built amid difficulties acquiring land from opposing farmers. Some privately held properties remain within the airport complex, including a farm around which one of the runways was built. Due to the dispute contributing to restrictions on airport operations, the airport is subject to a mandatory late night curfew prohibiting aircraft operations between 12 midnight and 6.00 a.m. in order to limit aircraft noise in surrounding communities.

Narita was historically Japan's busiest airport for international passenger and cargo traffic. In 2018, it handled 33.4 million international passengers and 2.2 million tonnes of international cargo. In 2018, Narita was also the second-busiest airport in Japan in terms of aircraft movements (after Haneda Airport in Tokyo) and the tenth-busiest air freight hub in the world. Its 4-kilometer (13,000 ft) main runway is among the longest airport runways in Japan. Narita serves as an international hub for Japan Airlines, All Nippon Airways, and Nippon Cargo Airlines, and is also an operating base for low-cost carriers Air Japan, Jetstar Japan, Peach Aviation, Spring Airlines Japan, and Zipair Tokyo.

== History ==
=== Construction and local resistance ===
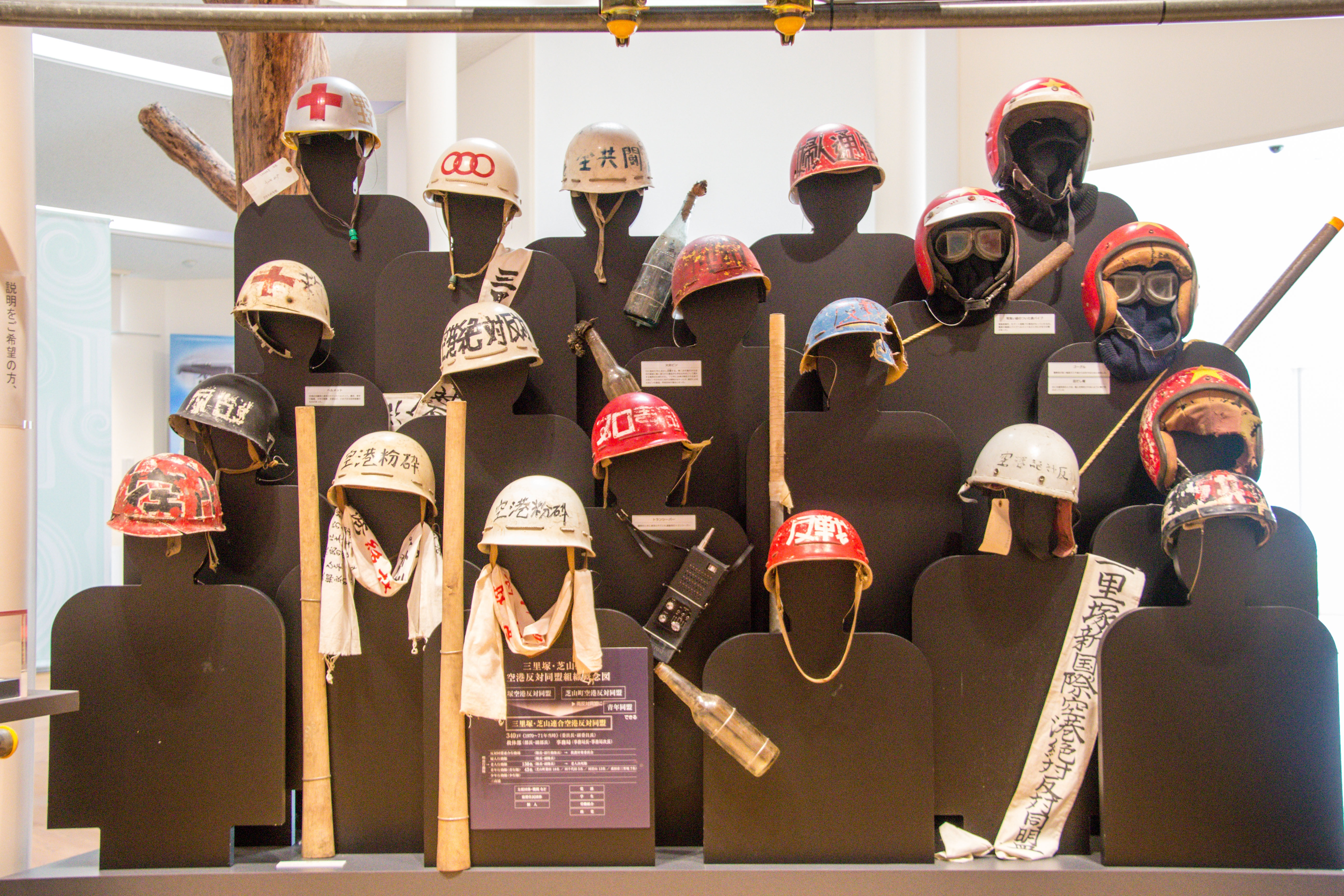
Anti-airport protesters' equipment and weapons

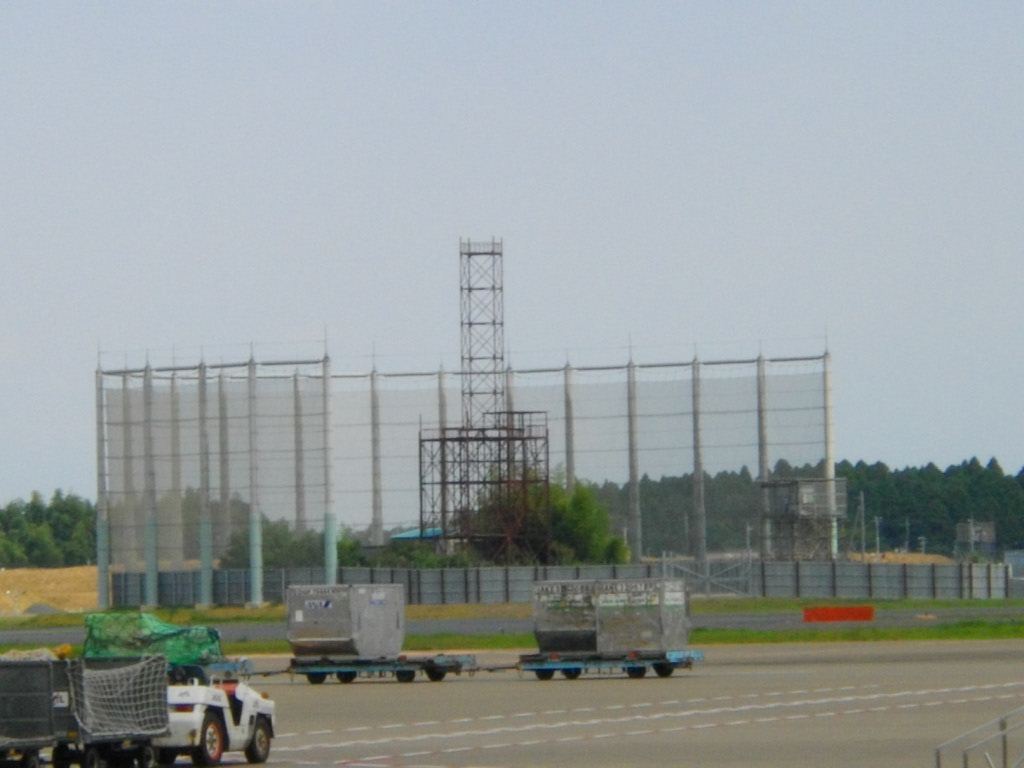
Steel tower built by protesters adjacent to Narita Airport

Before Narita opened, Tokyo International Airport (also known as Haneda Airport) was Tokyo's main international airport. Haneda, located in Tokyo Bay, was surrounded by densely populated residential and industrial areas, and began to suffer capacity and noise issues in the early 1960s as jet aircraft became common. The Japanese transport ministry commissioned a study of alternate airport locations in 1963, and in 1965 selected a plan to build a five-runway airport in the village of Tomisato. The site was later moved 5 km (3.1 mi) northeast to the villages of Sanrizuka and Shibayama, where the Imperial Household had a large farming estate. This development plan was made public in 1966.

The government argued that one merit of the site was the relative ease of expropriation of land. However, residents were not consulted during the initial planning phase, and learned of the selection of the airport site through the news. This led to shock and anger among the local community, which continued for many years. Though the Japanese government had eminent domain power by law, such power was rarely used due to a preference to resolve land disputes consensually.

At the time, the socialist movement still had considerable strength in Japan, evidenced by the large-scale student riots in Tokyo in 1960. Many in the "new left" such as Chūkaku-ha opposed building Narita, reasoning that the real purpose for the new airport was to promote capitalism and to provide additional facilities for US military aircraft in the event of war with the Soviet Union. These individuals sought to ally with the more conservative local farmers who simply did not want to give up their land for the airport.

About 1966, a group of residents combined with student activists and left-wing political parties formed a popular resistance group, the Sanrizuka-Shibayama Union to Oppose the Airport, which remained active until fracturing in 1983 and they started protest activity called Sanrizuka Struggle. Similar strategies had already been employed during the postwar era to block the expansion of Tachikawa Air Base and other US military facilities in Japan. In June and July 1966, the Union sent formal protests to the mayor of Narita, the governor and vice-governor of Chiba Prefecture, and the prefectural office of the Liberal Democratic Party. In November 1967, when the Transport Ministry began surveying the perimeter of the airport, Union members set up roadblocks. The Zengakuren radical student union then began sending students to Narita to help the local farmers. During eminent domain, three policemen were killed by activists.

Takenaka Corporation constructed the first terminal building, which was completed in 1972. The first runway took several more years due to constant fights with the Union and sympathizers, who occupied several pieces of land necessary to complete the runway and temporarily built large towers in the runway's path.

The runway was completed and the airport scheduled to open on 30 March 1978, but this plan was disrupted when, on 26 March 1978, a group of protestors broke into the control tower and destroyed much of its equipment, causing about $500,000 in damage and delaying the opening until 20 May.

The airport opened under a high level of security; the airfield was surrounded by opaque metal fencing and overlooked by guard towers staffed with riot police. 14,000 security police were at the airport's opening and were met by 6,000 protesters; a Japanese newscaster remarked at the time that "Narita resembles nothing so much as Saigon Airport during the Vietnam War." Protestors attacked police on the opening day with rocks and firebombs while police responded with water cannons; on the other side of Tokyo, a separate group of protestors claimed responsibility for cutting the power supply to an air traffic control facility at Tokorozawa, which shut down most air traffic in the Tokyo area for several hours. The National Diet passed a special statute, the Emergency Measures Act Relating to the Preservation of Security at New Tokyo International Airport, specifically banning the construction and use of buildings for violent and coercive purposes relating to the new airport.

The conflicts at Narita were a major factor in the decision to build Kansai International Airport in Osaka offshore on reclaimed land, instead of again trying to expropriate land in heavily populated areas.

Japan's international flag carrier, Japan Airlines, moved its main international hub from Haneda to Narita, and Northwest and Pan American also moved their Asian regional hubs from Haneda to Narita. The two U.S. carriers operate fifth-freedom routes to various Asian countries under a bilateral agreement. Pan American transferred its Pacific Division, including its Narita hub, to United Airlines in February 1986. Japanese domestic carrier All Nippon Airways began scheduled international flights from Narita to Guam in 1986.

=== Security ===
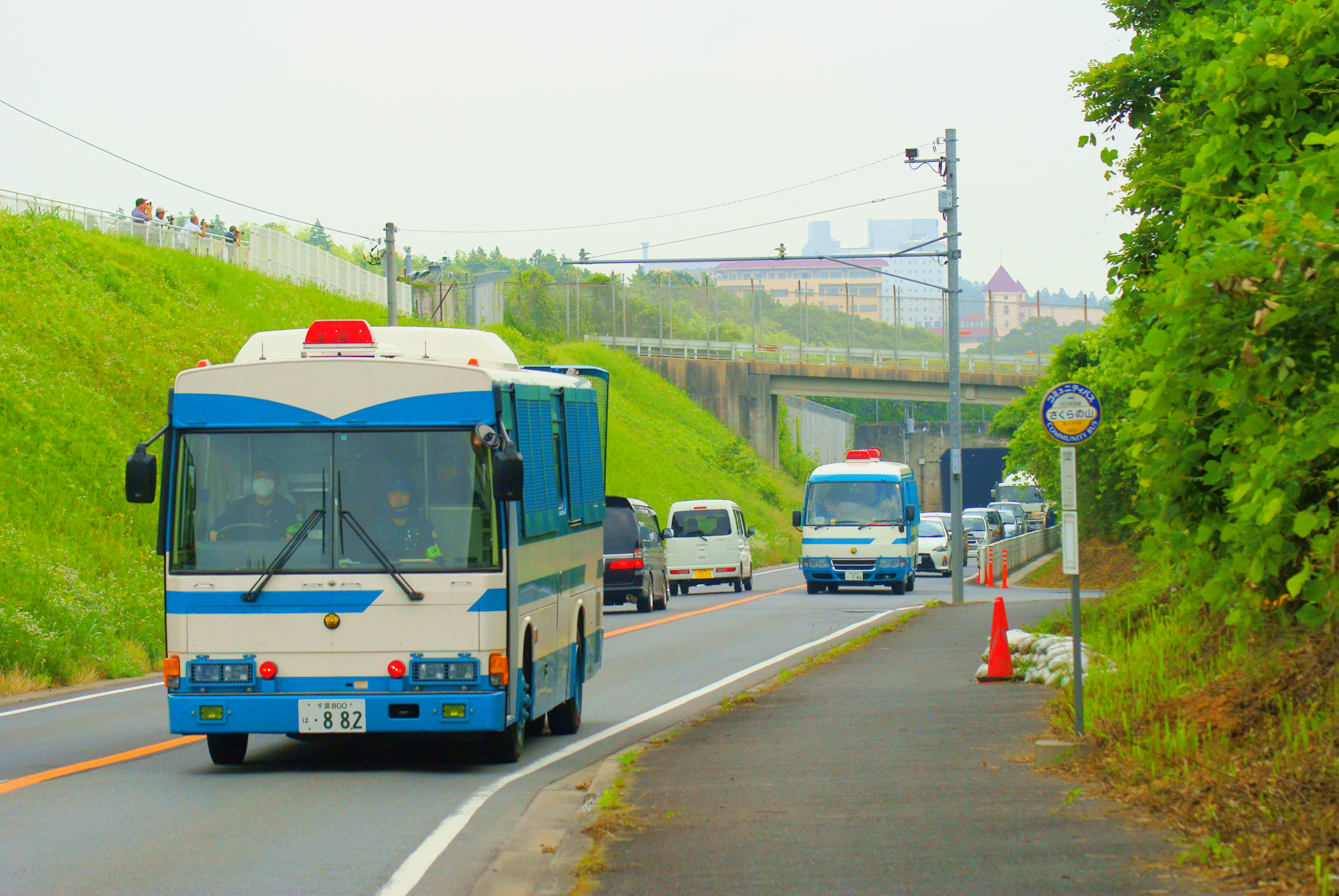
Riot squad vehicles patrolling the outskirts of Tokyo Narita Airport

From 1978 to 2015, Narita Airport was the only airport in Japan where visitors were required to show ID upon entry, due to the tumultuous history of the airport's construction and the violent protests before, during, and after its opening. By 2012, Narita's operator was considering dispensing with the security checks. Given that the number of flight slots at Narita are also increasing, the anti-airport struggles were decades in the past, and Haneda Airport began to re-instate international flights, a council headed by Chiba governor Kensaku Morita consisting of prefectural government officials, the Narita International Airport Corporation and business groups in Narita, proposed scrapping the ID checks. The Chiba prefectural police objected, stating that the checks were necessary to detect extremists and terrorists.

NAA experimented with a new threat detection system for two months in 2013, using a combination of cameras, explosive detectors, dogs and other measures in lieu of passport and baggage checks upon entering the terminal. In March 2015, NAA announced that the ID checks would cease and the new system would be used for terminal building security, effective as of the end of that month.

Narita Airport was the first Japanese airport to house millimeter wave scanners. The Ministry of Land, Infrastructure and Transport announced in March 2010 that trials would be carried out at Narita from 5 July through 10 September 2010. Five types of machines were to be tested sequentially outside the Terminal 1 South Wing security checkpoint; the subjects were Japanese nationals who volunteered for trial screening, as well as airport security staff during hours when the checkpoint is closed.

=== Privatization ===
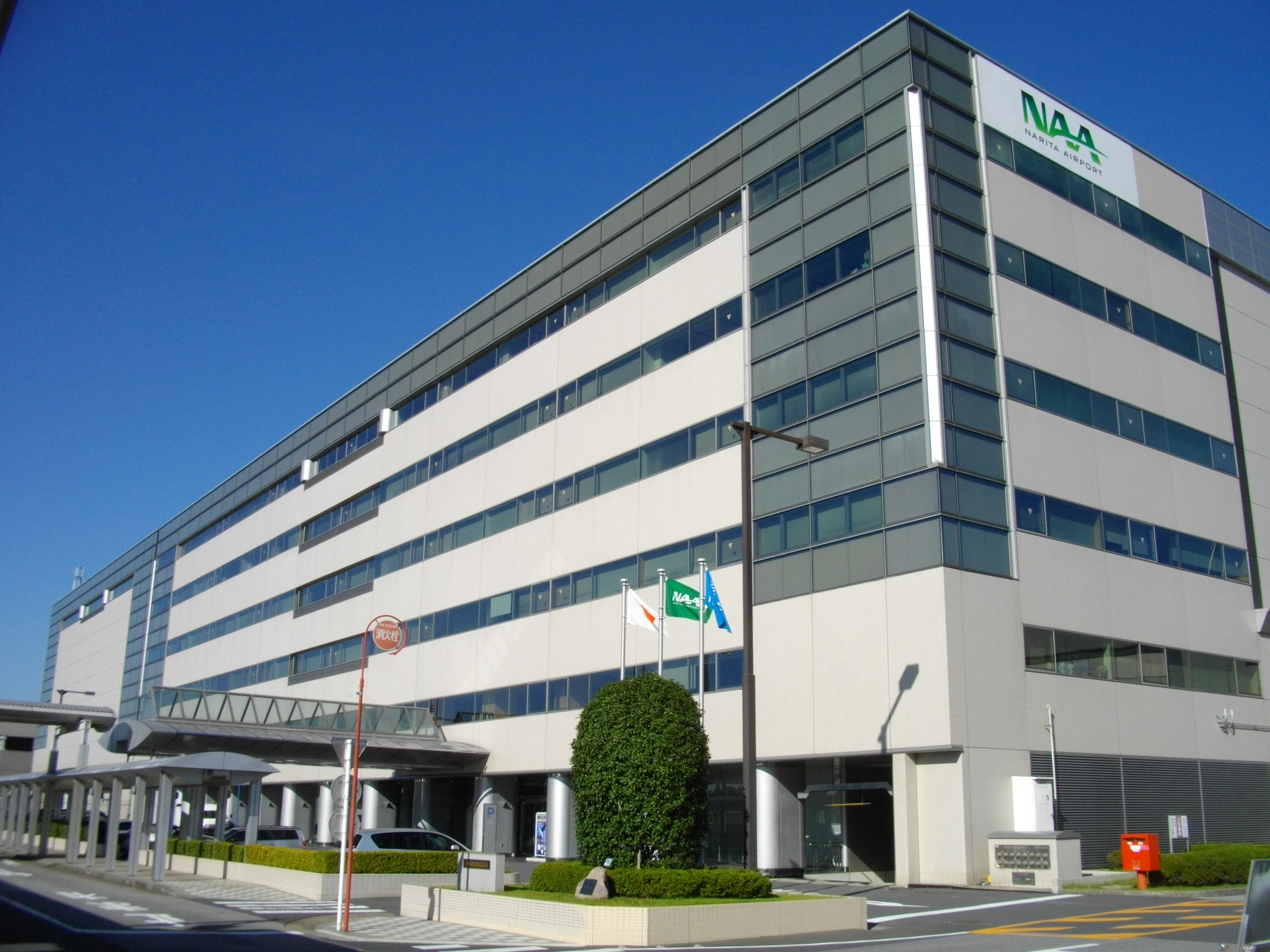
Headquarters of NAA

In 2003, a Narita International Airport Corporation Act (成田国際空港株式会社法) was passed to provide for the privatization of the airport. As part of this change, on 1 April 2004, New Tokyo International Airport was officially renamed Narita International Airport, reflecting its popular designation since its opening. The airport was also moved from government control to the authority of a new Narita International Airport Corporation, usually abbreviated to "NAA."

The headquarters is on the airport grounds. The authority previously had its head office in Tokyo with some offices in and around Narita; the head office moved and the Narita offices consolidated according to the decision by the Japanese Cabinet in July 1988 making it a special corporation. The NAA head office started operations at the airport on 1 July 1996, in the former Japan Airlines operations center, acquired by NAA in July 1994. Renovations occurred from September 1995 to March 1996. After the move, the Kishimoto Building in Marunouchi, Chiyoda, Tokyo housed the NAA's Tokyo functions.

To assist in the relationship with the local community, NAA operates the Community Consultation Center (地域相談センター) and the Airport Information Center (空港情報センター). The Community Consultation Center is in the Chiyoda Branch of Shibayama-machi Community Center in Osato, Shibayama, while the Airport Information Center is located in Sanrizuka, Narita.

=== Expansion and increased capacity ===
Airport layout (before the opening of Terminal 3)

New Tokyo International Airport was originally envisioned to have five runways, but the initial protests in 1965 led to a down-scaling of the plan to three runways: two parallel northwest–southeast runways 4,000 m (13,123 ft) in length and an intersecting northeast–southwest runway 3,200 m (10,499 ft) in length. Upon the airport's opening in 1978, only one of the parallel runways was completed (16R/34L, also known as "Runway A"); the other two runways were delayed to avoid aggravating the already tense situation surrounding the airport. The original plan also called for a high-speed rail line, the Narita Shinkansen, to connect the airport to central Tokyo, but this project was also cancelled with only some of the necessary land obtained.

By 1986, the strengthening Japanese yen was causing a surge of foreign business and leisure travel from Japan, which made Narita's capacity shortage more apparent. However, eight families continued to own slightly less than 53 acres (21 ha) of land on the site that would need to be expropriated in order to complete the other two runways. Although the government could legally force a sale of the land, it elected not to do so "because of fears of more violence." By 1991, Narita was handling 22 million passengers a year, despite only having a design capacity of 13 million.

==== Terminal 2 and the second runway "B" ====
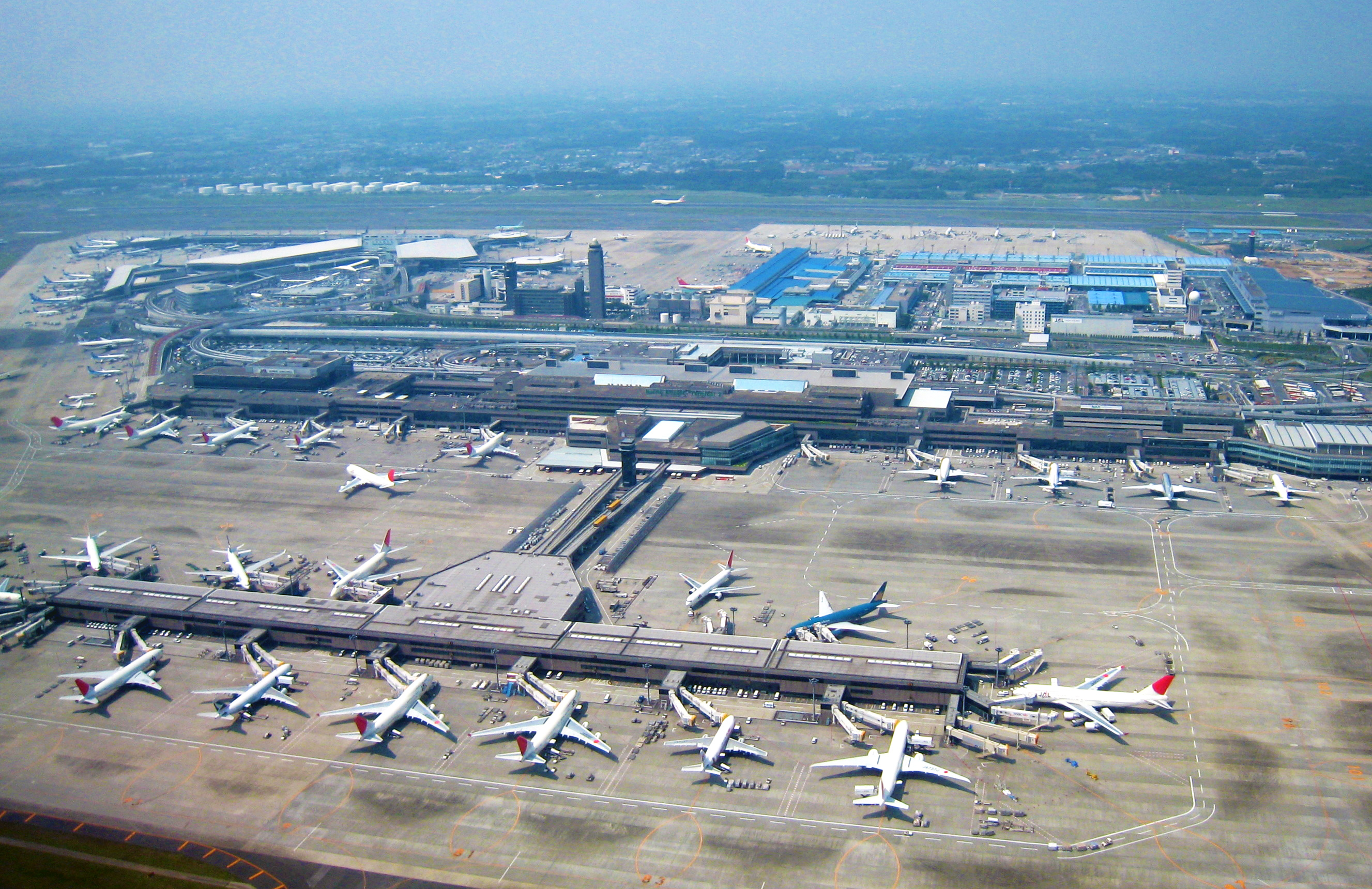
Aerial view of Terminal 2 in 2008

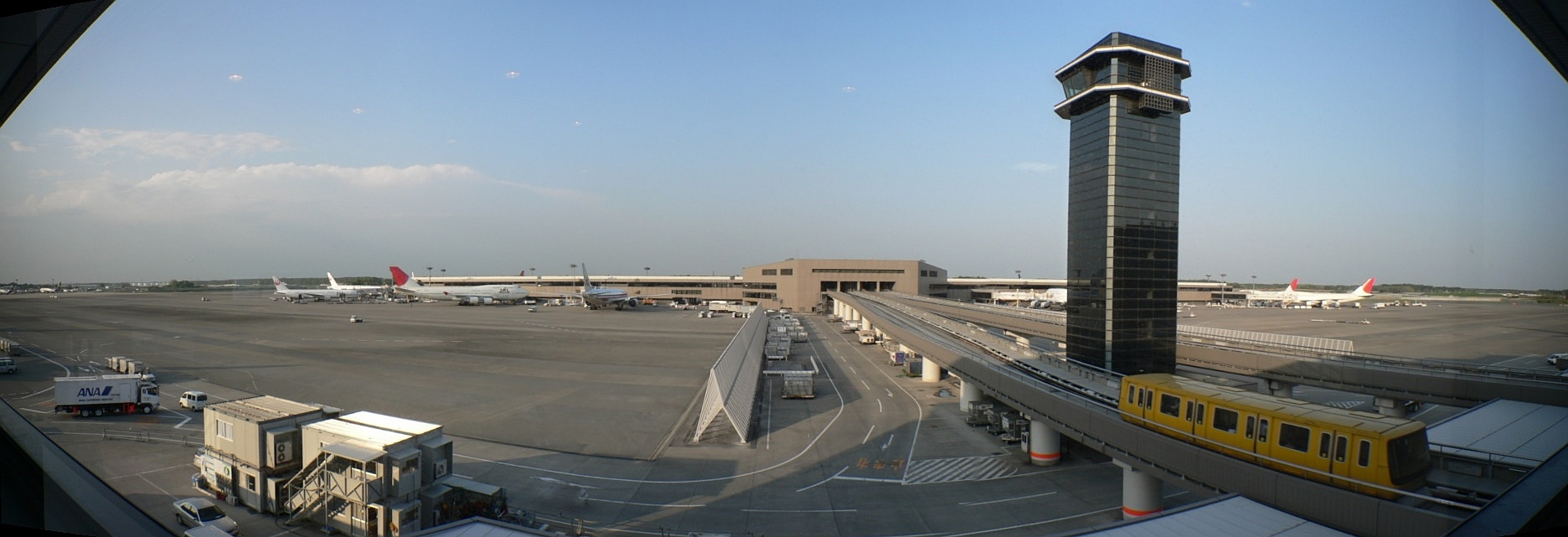
Panorama from inside the Yahoo! Internet Cafe showing the Terminal 2 satellite, ramp control tower and airport shuttle (removed in 2013)

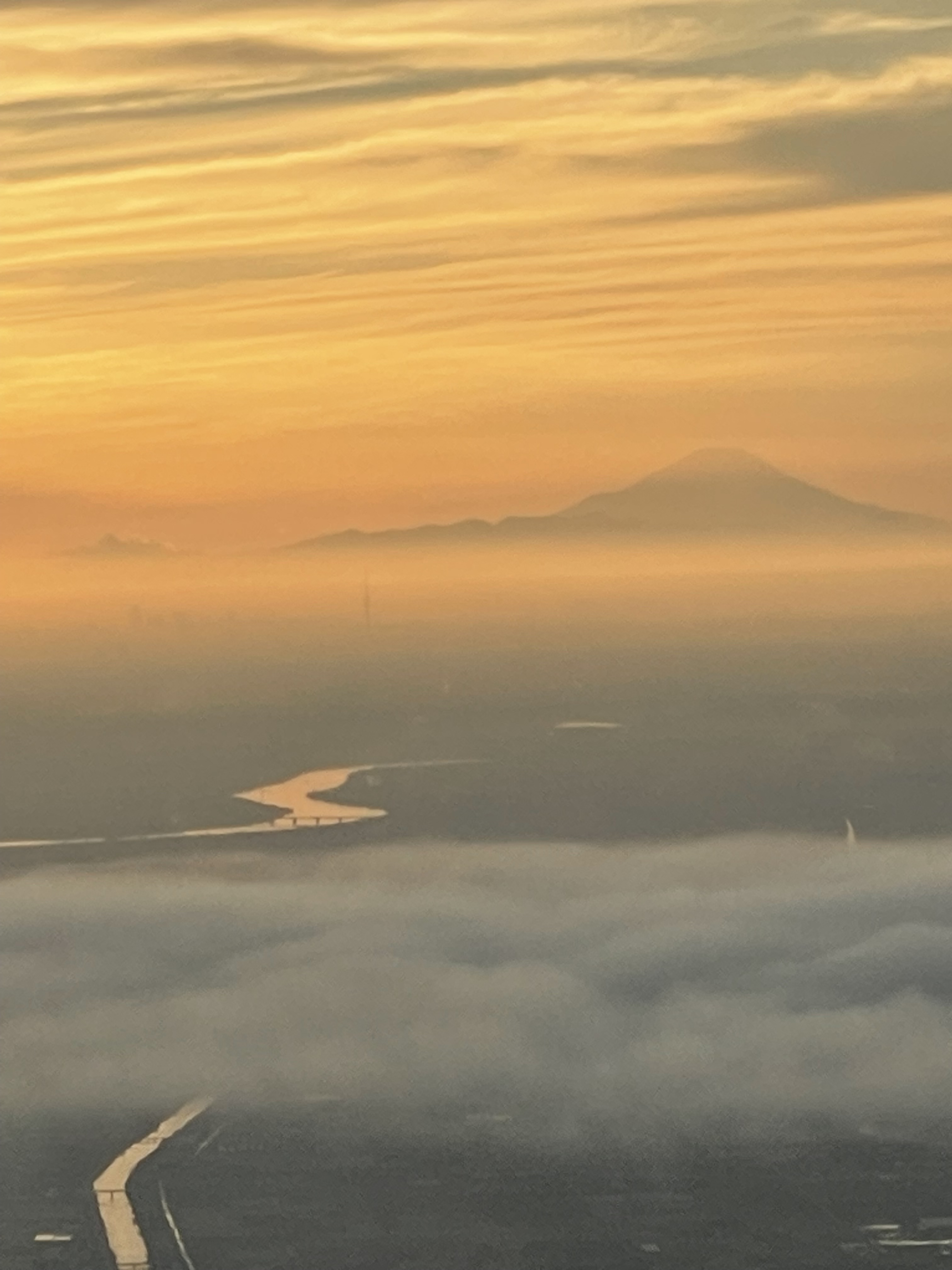
During certain times of the day, Mount Fuji and Tokyo Skytree are visible when approaching the runway

On 26 November 1986, the airport authority began work on Phase II, a new terminal and runway north of the airport's original main runway. To avoid the problems that plagued the first phase, the Minister of Transport promised in 1991 that the expansion would not involve expropriation. Residents in surrounding regions were compensated for the increased noise-pollution with home upgrades and soundproofing. These improvements continue to this day.

Terminal 2 opened on 4 December 1992, at a cost of $1.36 billion. The new terminal had approximately 1.5 times the space of the older terminal, but its anti-congestion benefits were delayed because of the need to close and renovate much of the older terminal. The airport's land situation also meant that the taxiway to the new terminal was one-way for much of its length, and that taxi times between the terminal and runway were up to 30 minutes.

The Runway B (16L/34R) opened on 17 April 2002, in time for the World Cup events held in Korea and Japan that year. However, its final length of 2,180 m (7,152 ft), much shorter than its original plan length of 2,500 m (8,202 ft), left it too short to accommodate Boeing 747s. The runway was further impeded by a three-story concrete building in the path of its taxiway, which the Union had constructed in 1966, forcing the taxiway to bend inward toward the runway. This imposed restrictions on the number of aircraft that could use the runway, since it was impossible for an aircraft to safely pass through the curve in the taxiway while another aircraft was using the runway.

The Runway B was extended northward to 2,500 meters (8,202 ft) on 22 October 2009, allowing an additional 20,000 flights per year. In 2008, the Supreme Court of Japan ruled in favor of the airport authority regarding ownership of Union-occupied land in the path of the taxiway, allowing the taxiway to be modified to provide enough room for safe passing. The building remained in place until August 2011, when authorities removed it under a court order; 500 police officers were dispatched to provide security for the operation while 30 airport opponents protested. Beginning on 20 October 2011, the airport was approved to allow simultaneous landings and take-offs from the A and B runways. The approval allowed the airport to increase annual take offs from 220,000 to 235,000 and increase hourly departure capacity from 32 to 46. The parallel runways are 2.5 km (1.6 mi) apart.

==== Transit upgrades ====
Railway routes between Tokyo and NRT. Narita Express of JR East is in gray. New Skyliner route is in purple. The Keisei Main Line is in green

The Japanese government has also invested in several local infrastructure projects in order to address the demands of airport neighbors. The largest of these is the Shibayama Railway, a short railway connection between the Keisei Main Line and the area immediately east of Narita Airport. This line opened in 2002 with government and NAA support after extensive demands from Shibayama residents, and provides a direct rail link from Shibayama to Narita City, Chiba City and central Tokyo. Another such project is the Museum of Aeronautical Sciences in Shibayama Town, which draws tourists and student groups to the area.

== Future developments ==
=== Runway B extension ===
A further extension of the Runway B to 3,500 meters (11,483 ft) has been under official consideration since 2014. Permitting for the extension was approved in January 2020. The final plan calls for the runway to be extended to the northwest, and requires a 430-meter (1,410 ft) section of the Higashi-Kanto Expressway to be replaced with a tunnel beneath the runway; construction is scheduled to be complete in fiscal year 2028.

=== Runway C ===
The airport's original master plan also included a planned 3,200 meters (10,499 ft) third "C" runway, which would be a crossing runway south of the passenger terminals. Although the majority of the land and equipment required in order to build the runway are under NAA's ownership, small portions of land needed to be accessed in order to build the runway are still blocked by airport protesters, and areas south of the South Wing of the terminal are being used as aircraft parking and storage. Noise abatement would also be an issue, especially since there are major towns such as Yachimata on the planned departure/arrival routes. Noise abatement negotiations would have to be worked through in order to use the runway, otherwise a Kai-Tak style approach would be necessary, which is less than favourable. For these following reasons, building work on the third "C" runway was finally aborted.

In March 2018, NAA released a new masterplan for expansion, which included a third "Runway C" on the east side of the airport to be completed by 2028. The new runway will increase the airport's annual slot capacity from 300,000 to 460,000. The runway project will enable the airport to extend the airport's operating hours to cover the period between 0:30 and 5:00 local time. Local authorities agreed to the expansion plan after an 18-month process due to the need for further local revitalization. The final plan, approved in January 2020 and published in December 2021, calls for a 3,500-meter (11,483 ft) runway on the east side of the airport, built over two underground road tunnels, with completion by fiscal year 2028.

=== Terminals ===
In September 2022, NAA announced a conceptual plan to consolidate the three existing terminals into a single facility called "One Terminal." Plans had previously called for a fourth terminal building to be added in conjunction with the construction of Runway C, but due to the aging of the older terminals, NAA opted to plan for the replacement of the older terminals with new structures. The plans also call for a new cargo facility and upgraded transit links to central Tokyo.

== Terminals ==
Narita was among the first airports in the world to align its terminals around the three major international airline alliances. Since 2006, the airport has arranged for SkyTeam carriers to use the North Wing of Terminal 1, Star Alliance carriers to use the South Wing of Terminal 1, and Oneworld carriers to use Terminal 2. Narita has 83 gates with jet bridges.

=== Terminal 1 ===
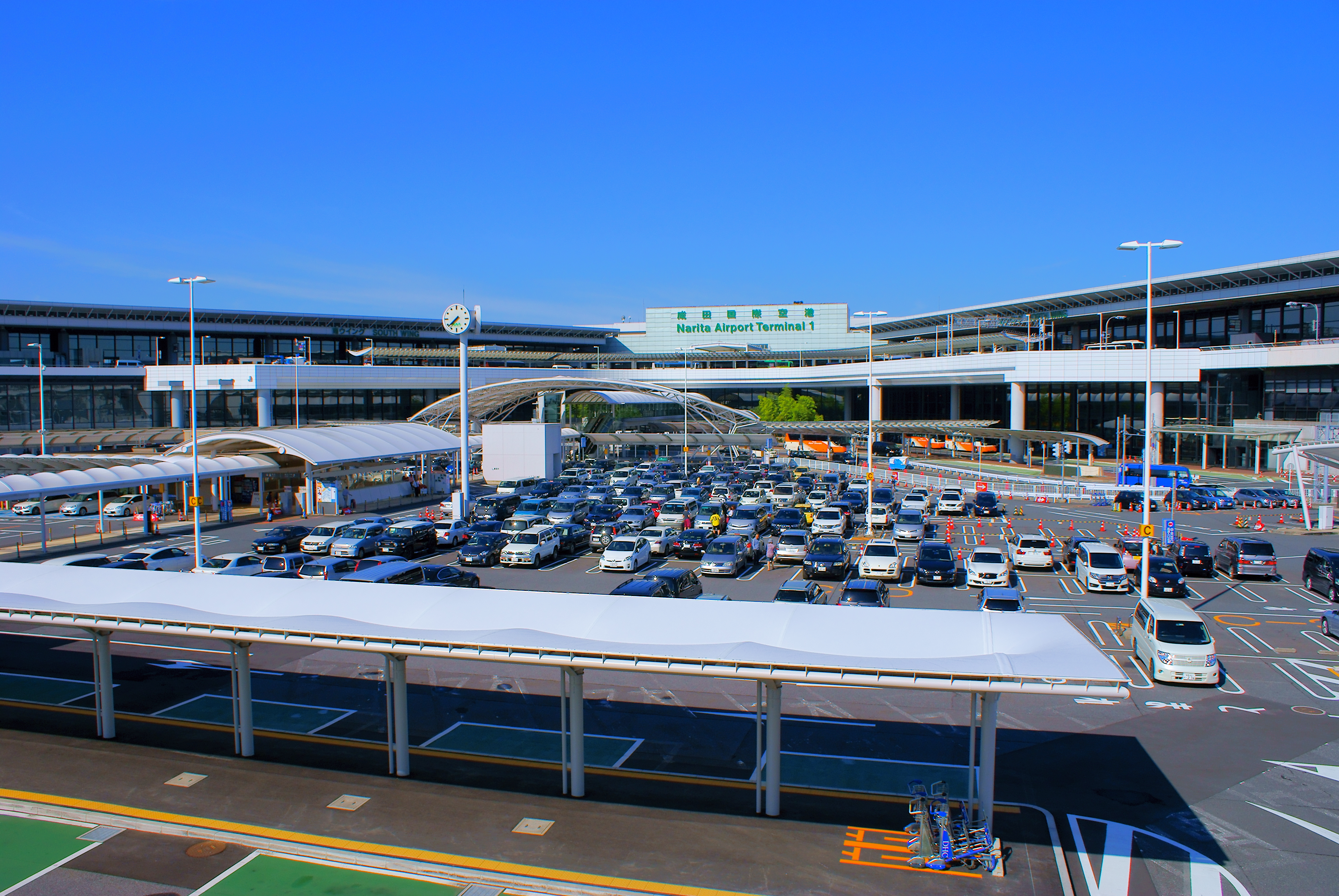
The exterior of Terminal 1

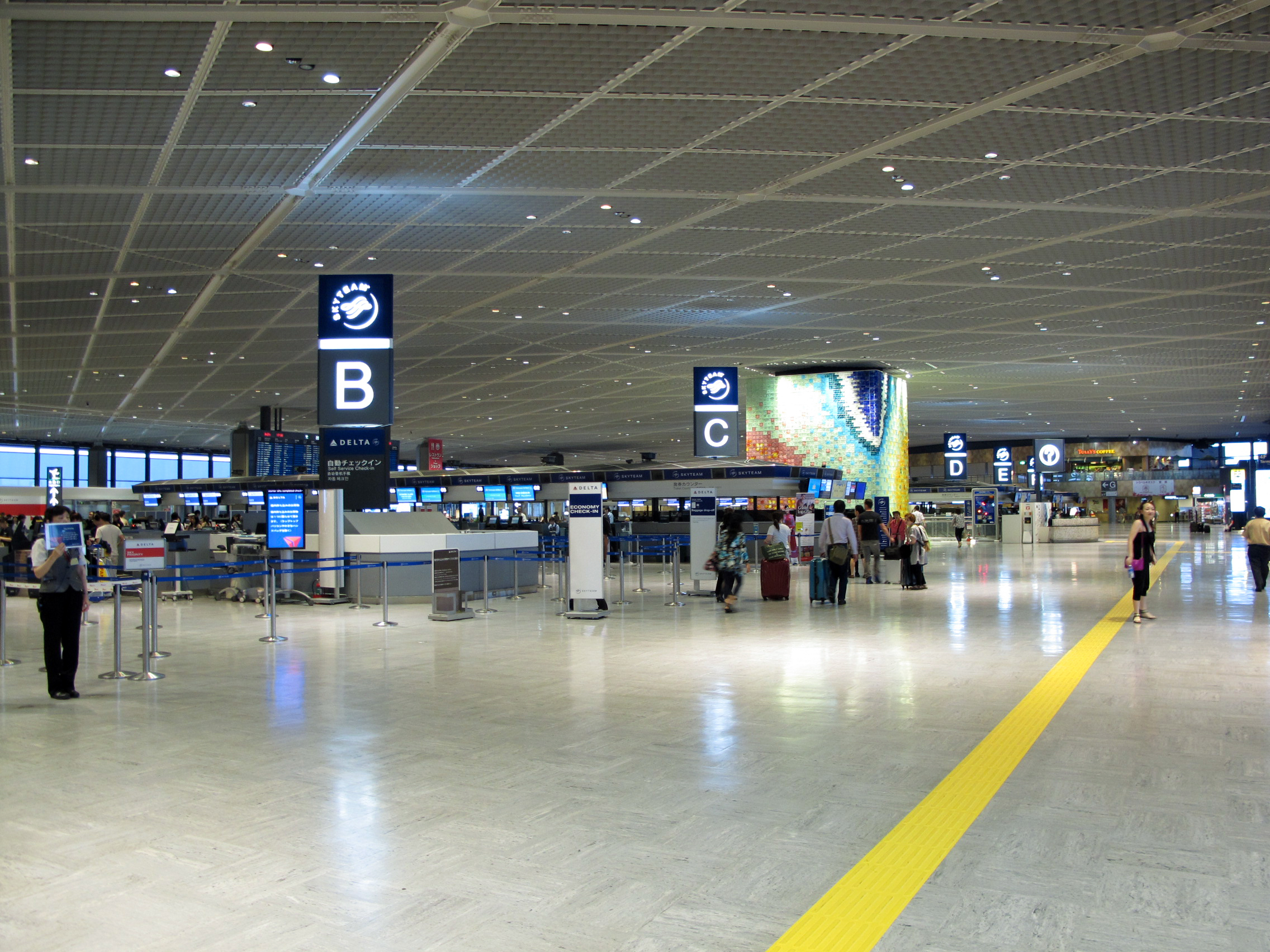
Terminal 1 North Wing Departure Lobby

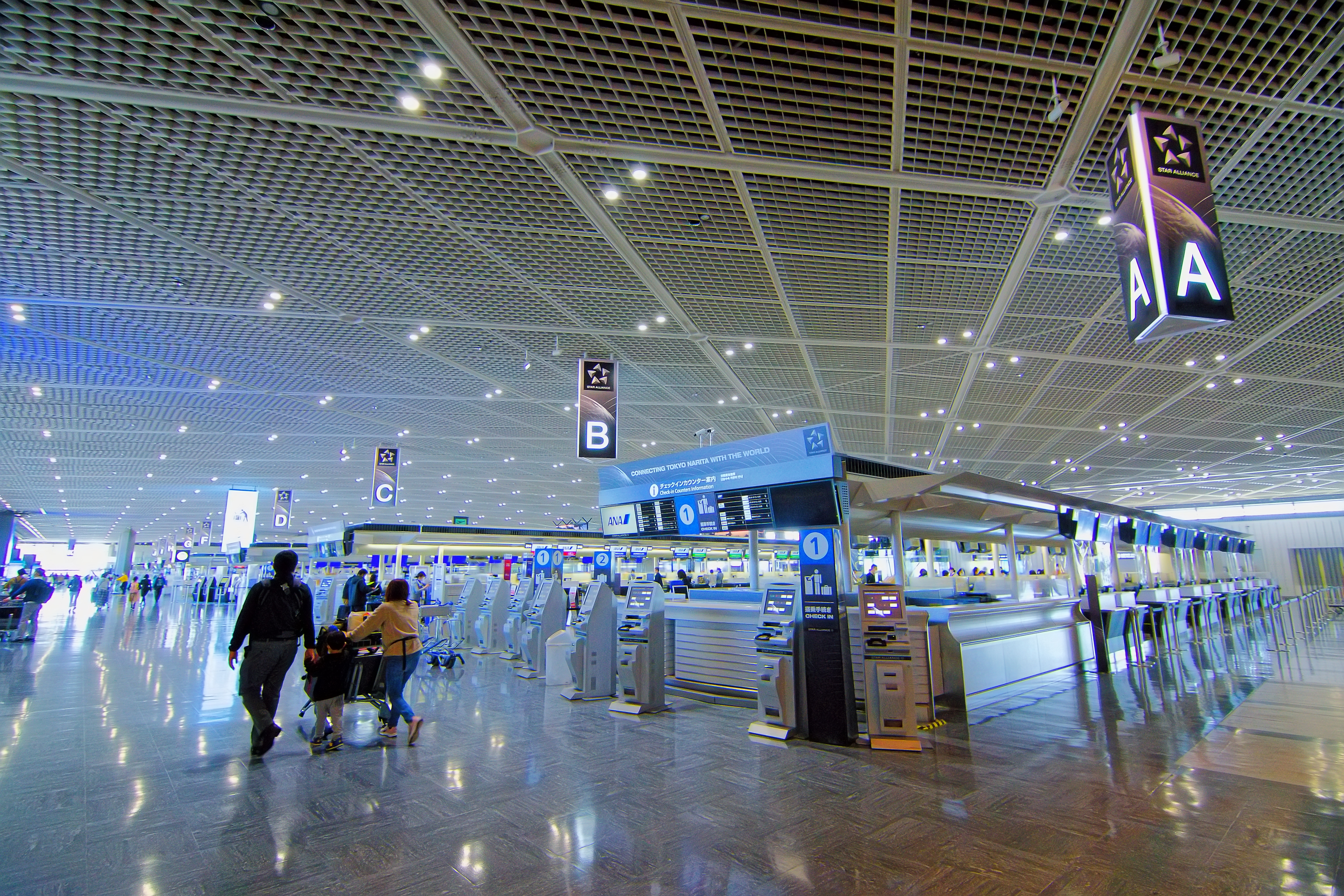
Terminal 1 South Wing Departure Lobby

Terminal 1 uses a satellite terminal design divided into a North Wing (北ウイング, kita-uingu), Central Building (中央ビル, chūō-biru), and a South Wing (南ウイング, minami-uingu). Two circular satellites, Satellites 1 (gates 11–18) and 2 (gates 21–24), are connected to the North Wing. Satellites 3 and 4 (gates 26–38 and gates 41–47) comprise a linear concourse connected to the Central Building. Satellite 5 (gates 51–58) is connected to the South Wing. The terminal building has a floorspace of 463,000 m^{2} (4,980,000 sq ft) and equipped with 40 gates.

The North Wing has served as an alliance hub for SkyTeam since 2007, and previously housed the Northwest Airlines hub, which was acquired by Delta Air Lines in 2010. Delta shifted its Asian transit hub to Incheon International Airport in collaboration with Korean Air, and transferred all of its Tokyo operations from Narita to Haneda in March 2020. Other carriers in the North Wing are Aero Mongolia, Aircalin, China Southern Airlines, El Al, Etihad Airways, Hong Kong Airlines, Jin Air, Peach Aviation international flights, Royal Brunei Airlines, Sichuan Airlines, WestJet and Zipair Tokyo.

The South Wing and Satellite 5 opened in June 2006 as a terminal for Star Alliance carriers. The construction of the South Wing took nearly a decade and more than doubled the floor area of Terminal 1. Today, almost all Star Alliance members, including Japan's All Nippon Airways, use this wing, along with non-members Air Busan, Air Seoul, Scoot, Shandong Airlines, and Uzbekistan Airways.

ANA and Peach domestic flights use a separate area of the terminal accessed from the arrivals floor of the South Wing.

=== Terminal 2 ===
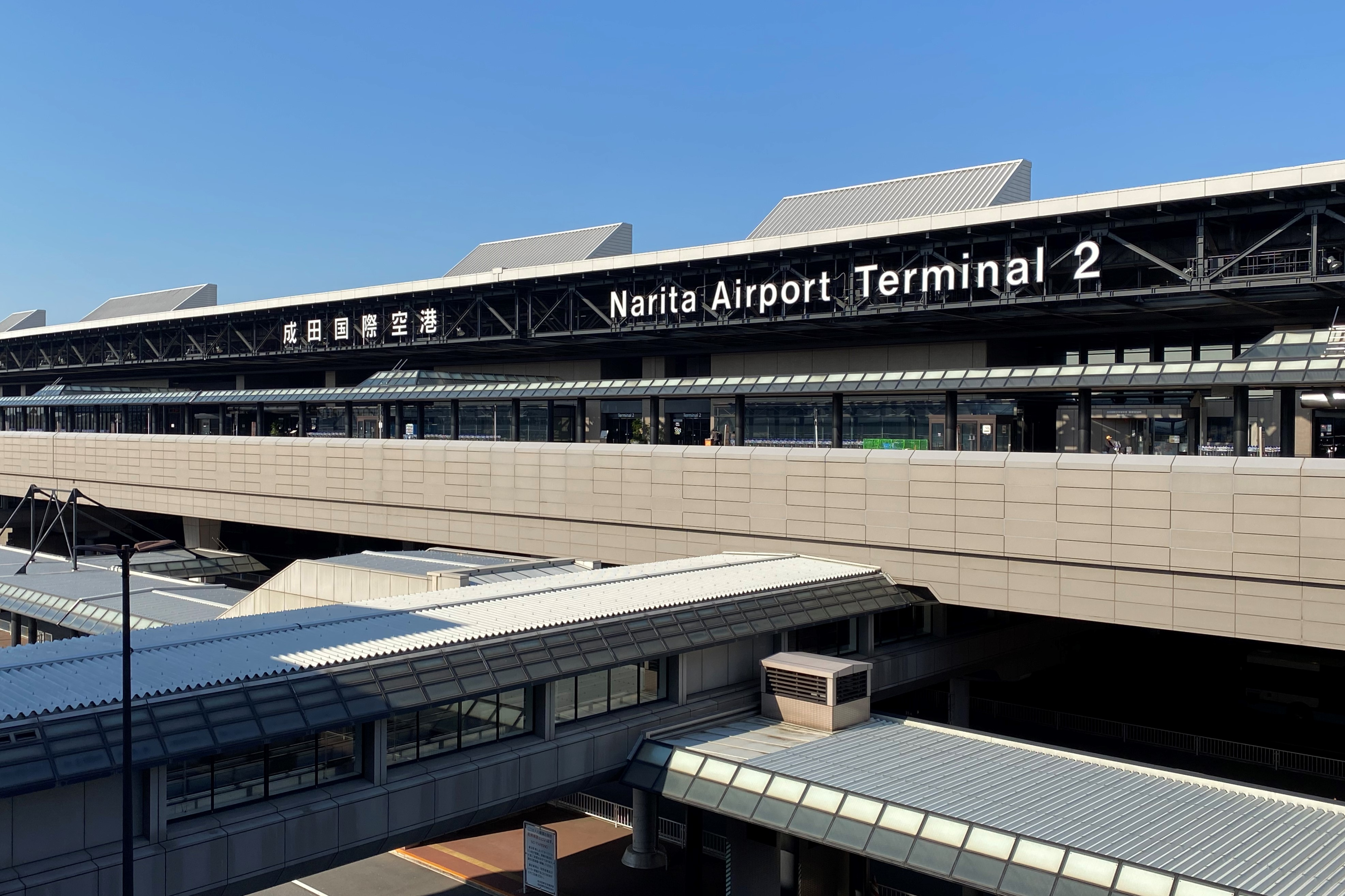
The exterior of Terminal 2

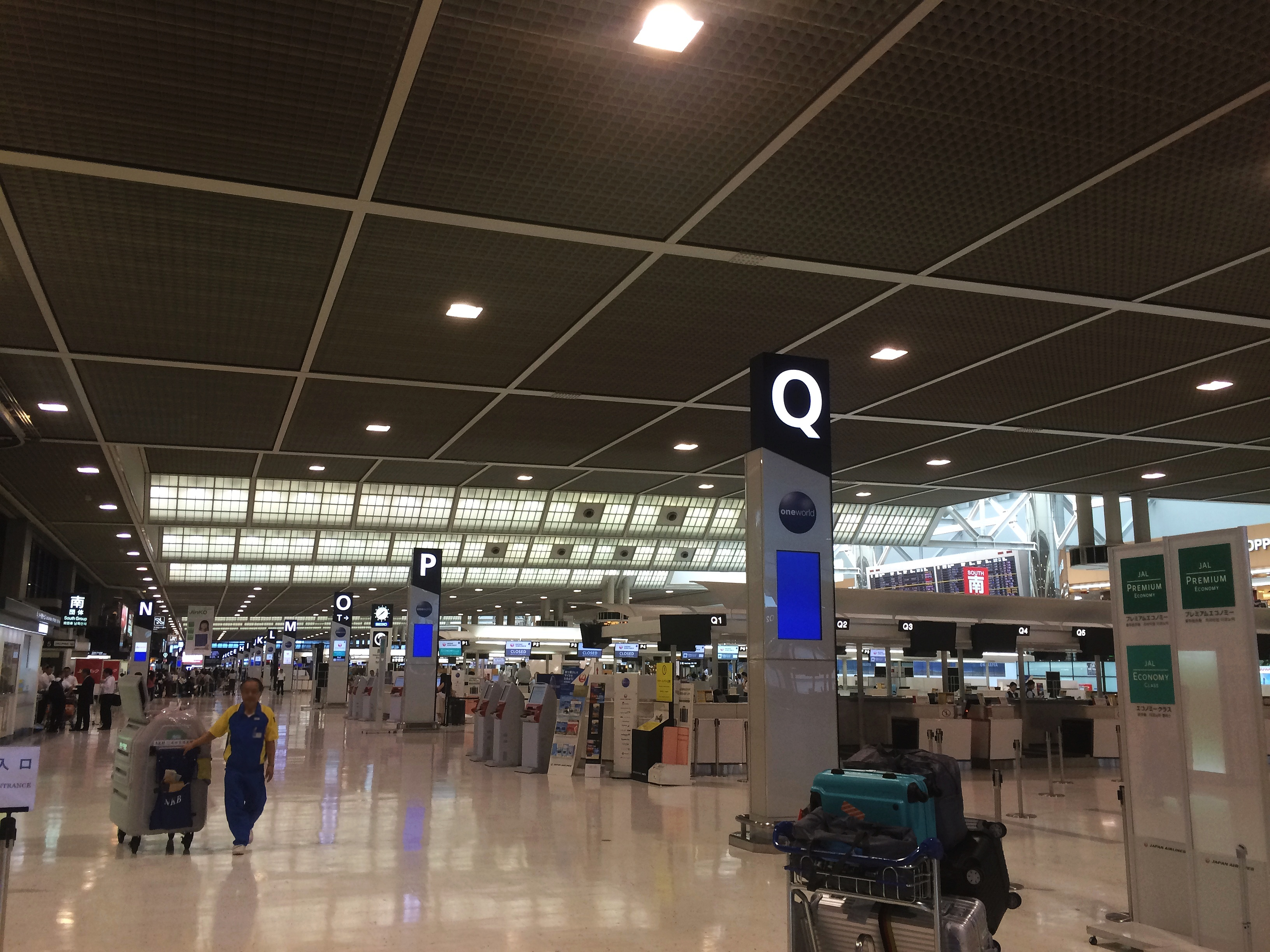
Terminal 2 Departure Lobby

Terminal 2, which opened in 1992, is divided into a main building (本館, honkan) and satellite (サテライト, sateraito), both of which are designed around linear concourses. The two were connected by the Terminal 2 Shuttle System, which was designed by Japan Otis Elevator and was the first cable-driven people mover in Japan. A new walkway between the main and satellite buildings began operation on 27 September 2013, and the shuttle system was discontinued. Terminal 2 can handle large aircraft like the Airbus A380 (operated by Emirates) and the Boeing 747-8. Terminal 2 has an area of 391,000 m^{2} (4,210,000 sq ft) and 32 boarding gates.

Japan Airlines is currently the main operator in T2. The terminal has served as a hub for all Oneworld alliance carriers at NRT since 2010, when British Airways moved from Terminal 1. Several other airlines also use the terminal, these are SkyTeam carriers China Airlines and China Eastern Airlines, as well as Star Alliance connecting partner Juneyao Air and non-affiliated carriers AirAsia, Air Macau, Air Premia, Bamboo Airways, Batik Air Malaysia, Cebu Pacific, Eastar Jet, Emirates, Greater Bay Airlines, Hainan Airlines, MIAT, Nepal Airlines, Pakistan International Airlines, Philippine Airlines, Starlux Airlines, Thai AirAsia X, Tigerair Taiwan, T'way Air, and VietJet. All Nippon Airways and several other Star Alliance carriers used Terminal 2 prior to the expansion of the Terminal 1 South Wing in 2006.

=== Terminal 3 ===
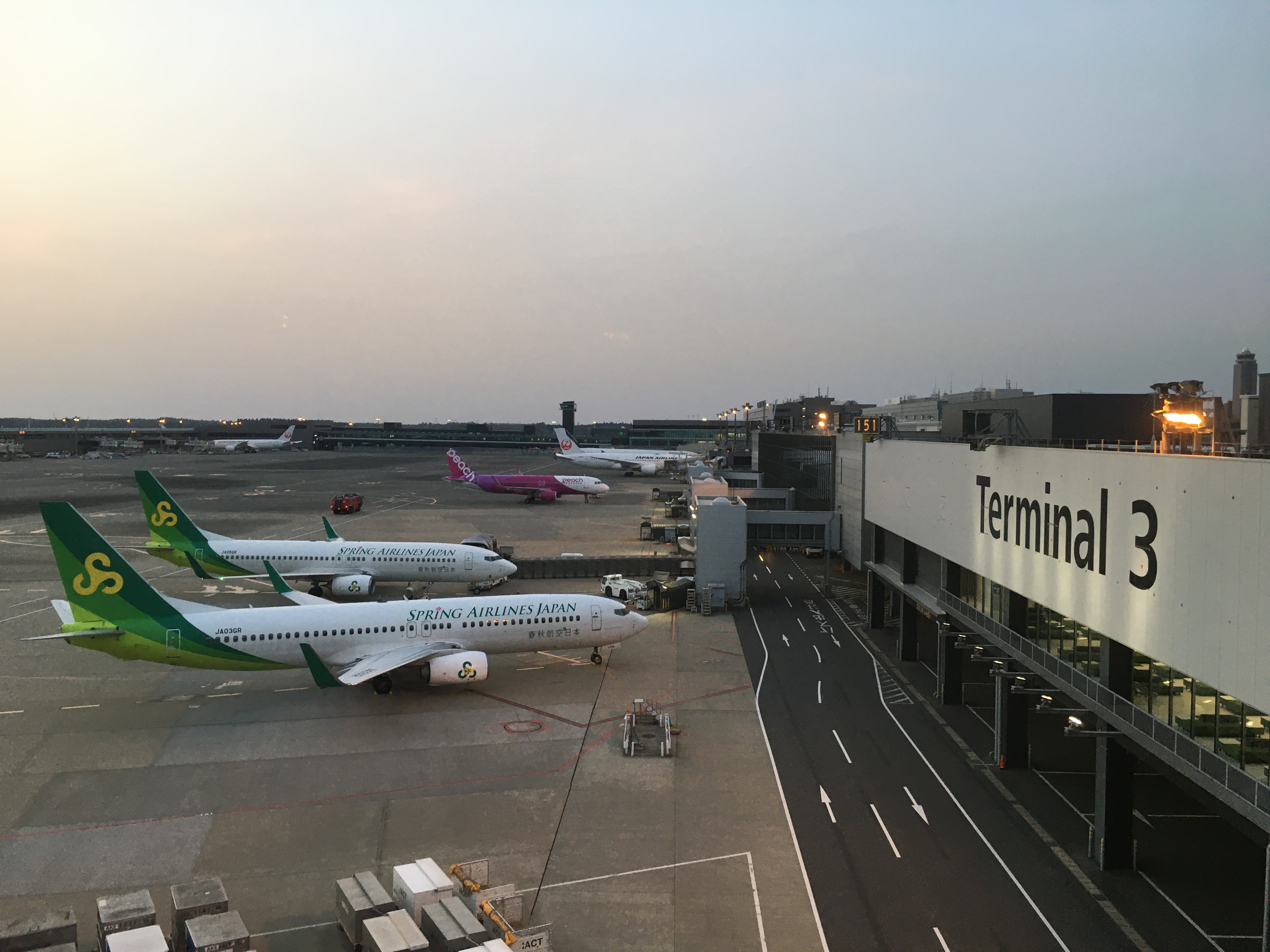
The exterior of Terminal 3

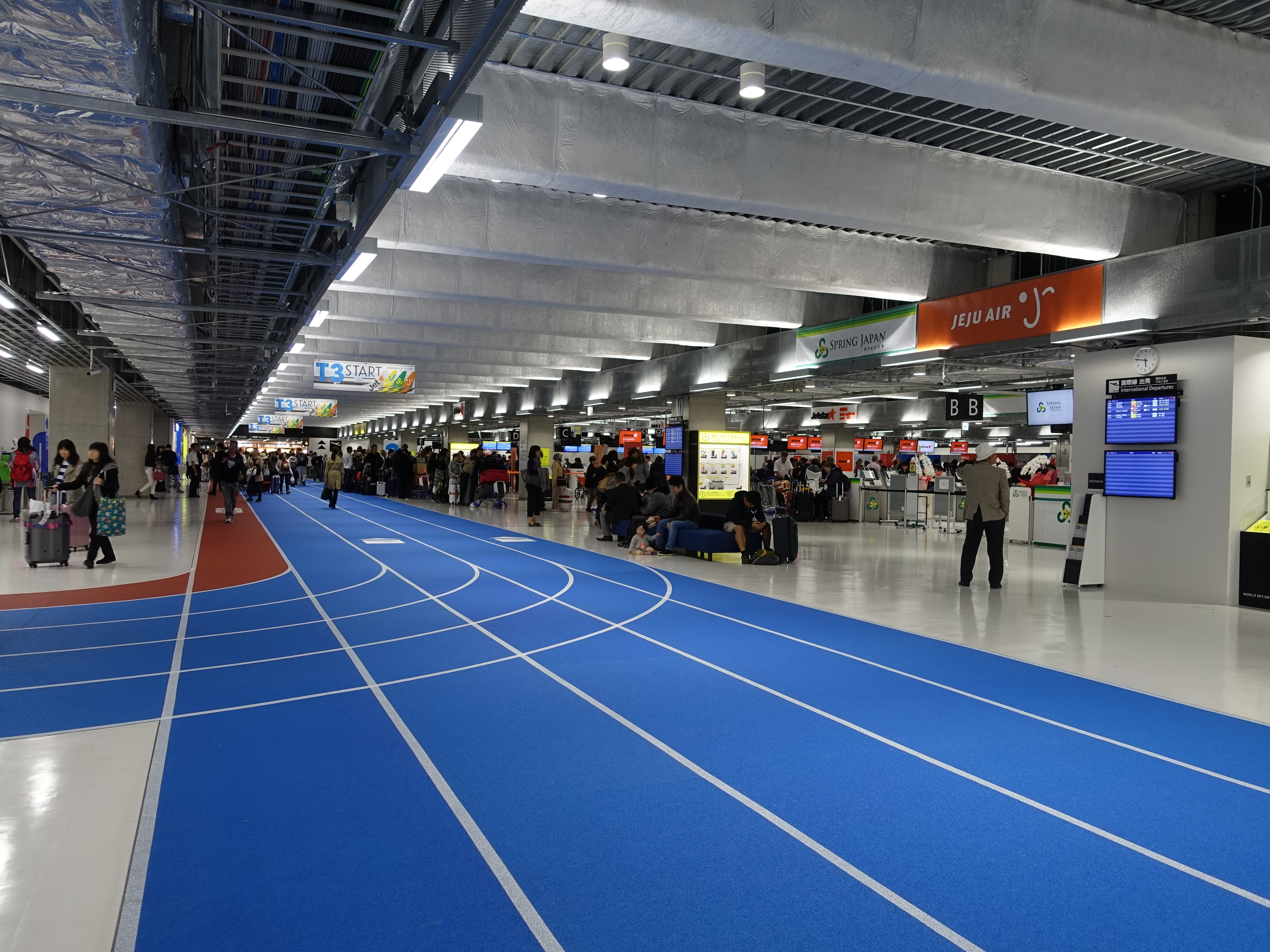
Interior of Terminal 3

Terminal 3, a terminal for low-cost carriers, opened on 8 April 2015. It is located 500 metres (1,640 ft) north of Terminal 2, where a cargo building used to sit, has a capacity of 50,000 flights per year and has 11 gates. The new terminal incorporates several cost-cutting measures, including using decals instead of lighted directional signs and using outdoor gates and airstairs instead of jet bridges, which are intended to reduce facility costs for airlines and their passengers by around 40% on international flights and 15% on domestic flights. Taisei Corporation was awarded a ¥11.2 billion contract to build the terminal in January 2013. The airport also constructed a new LCC apron to the north of the terminal, with five additional parking slots for Airbus A320 and similarly sized aircraft.

Aero K, Jeju Air, Jetstar, Jetstar Japan, Philippines AirAsia, Spring Airlines, and Spring Japan use Terminal 3. The terminal also includes a 24-hour food court, which is the largest airport food court in Japan, and two multifaith prayer rooms. It was built at a cost of 15 billion yen and covers 66,000 m^{2} (710,000 sq ft) of floor space.

Terminal 3 is voted 2024 best terminal for low-cost airlines in Asia and 2nd overall in the world by Skytrax.

== Airlines and destinations ==
=== Passenger ===
Airlines	Destinations
Aero K	Cheongju
Aero Mongolia	Ulaanbaatar
Aeroméxico	Mexico City–Benito Juárez; Seasonal: Monterrey
Air Astana	Almaty (begins 1 December 2026)
Air Busan	Busan, Seoul–Incheon
Air Cambodia	Fuzhou, Phnom Penh
Air Canada	Montréal–Trudeau, Toronto–Pearson, Vancouver
Air China	Beijing–Capital, Chengdu–Tianfu, Chongqing, Dalian, Hangzhou, Shanghai–Pudong, Tianjin
Air Macau	Macau
Air New Zealand	Auckland; Seasonal: Christchurch (resumes 28 November 2026)
Air Niugini	Port Moresby
Air Premia	Seoul–Incheon
Air Seoul	Seoul–Incheon
Air Tahiti Nui	Papeete
Alaska Airlines	Seattle/Tacoma; Seasonal: Anchorage (begins 14 May 2027)
All Nippon Airways	Bangkok–Suvarnabhumi, Brussels, Chicago–O'Hare, Dalian, Hangzhou, Hanoi, Ho Chi Minh City, Hong Kong, Honolulu, Jakarta–Soekarno-Hatta, Kuala Lumpur–International, Los Angeles, Manila, Mexico City–Benito Juárez, Mumbai–Shivaji, Nagoya–Centrair, Osaka–Itami, Perth, San Francisco, Sapporo–Chitose, Shanghai–Pudong, Singapore; Seasonal: Vancouver
American Airlines	Chicago–O'Hare (resumes 28 March 2027), Dallas/Fort Worth
Asiana Airlines	Seoul–Incheon
Austrian Airlines	Seasonal: Vienna
Batik Air Malaysia	Kuala Lumpur–International
Biman Bangladesh Airlines	Dhaka
Cathay Pacific	Hong Kong, Taipei–Taoyuan
Cebu Pacific	Cebu, Clark, Manila; Charter: Tagbilaran
China Airlines	Kaohsiung, Taipei–Taoyuan
China Eastern Airlines	Harbin, Kunming, Nanjing, Qingdao, Shanghai–Pudong, Shenyang, Wuhan, Yantai
China Southern Airlines	Changchun, Changsha, Dalian, Guangzhou, Harbin, Shanghai–Pudong, Shenyang, Shenzhen, Wuhan, Zhengzhou
Delta Air Lines	Seattle/Tacoma (resumes 28 March 2027)
Eastar Jet	Seoul–Incheon
EgyptAir	Cairo
El Al	Tel Aviv
Emirates	Dubai–International
Ethiopian Airlines	Addis Ababa, Seoul–Incheon
Etihad Airways	Abu Dhabi
EVA Air	Kaohsiung, Taipei–Taoyuan
Fiji Airways	Nadi
Finnair	Helsinki
Garuda Indonesia	Denpasar
Greater Bay Airlines	Hong Kong
Hainan Airlines	Beijing–Capital, Haikou
HK Express	Hong Kong
Hong Kong Airlines	Hong Kong
Iberia	Madrid
Japan Airlines	Bangkok–Suvarnabhumi, Bengaluru, Boston, Chicago–O'Hare (ends 28 March 2027), Delhi–Indira Gandhi, Frankfurt, Guam, Hanoi, Ho Chi Minh City, Hong Kong, Honolulu, Jakarta–Soekarno-Hatta, Kuala Lumpur–International, Los Angeles, Manila, Melbourne, Nagoya–Centrair, Osaka–Itami, San Diego, San Francisco, Seattle/Tacoma, Shanghai–Pudong, Singapore, Taipei–Taoyuan, Vancouver
Jeju Air	Busan, Seoul–Incheon
Jetstar	Brisbane, Cairns
Jetstar Japan	Asahikawa, Fukuoka, Hong Kong, Kagoshima, Kaohsiung, Kōchi, Kumamoto, Manila Matsuyama, Miyazaki, Nagasaki, Naha, Ōita, Osaka–Kansai, Sapporo–Chitose, Shanghai–Pudong, Shimojishima, Shonai, Taipei–Taoyuan, Takamatsu
Jin Air	Busan, Seoul–Incheon
Juneyao Air	Shanghai–Pudong
KLM	Amsterdam
Korean Air	Busan, Jeju, Seoul–Incheon
LOT Polish Airlines	Warsaw–Chopin
Lufthansa	Frankfurt (resumes 28 March 2027)
Malaysia Airlines	Kuala Lumpur–International
MIAT Mongolian Airlines	Ulaanbaatar
Nepal Airlines	Kathmandu
Parata Air	Seoul–Incheon
Peach	Amami Oshima, Fukuoka, Ishigaki, Kagoshima, Kushiro, Miyazaki, Nagasaki, Naha, Ōita, Osaka–Kansai, Sapporo–Chitose, Seoul–Incheon, Taipei–Taoyuan
Philippine Airlines	Cebu, Manila
Philippines AirAsia	Manila
Qantas	Brisbane, Melbourne
Qatar Airways	Doha
Royal Brunei Airlines	Bandar Seri Begawan
Saudia	Riyadh (begins 16 January 2027)
Scoot	Singapore, Taipei–Taoyuan
Shenzhen Airlines	Shenzhen
Sichuan Airlines	Chengdu–Tianfu
Singapore Airlines	Los Angeles, Singapore
Spring Airlines	Shanghai–Pudong
Spring Japan	Beijing–Capital, Dalian, Hakodate, Harbin, Hiroshima, Sapporo–Chitose, Shanghai–Pudong, Tianjin
SriLankan Airlines	Colombo–Bandaranaike
Starlux Airlines	Taichung, Taipei–Taoyuan
Swiss International Air Lines	Zurich
Thai AirAsia	Bangkok–Don Mueang, Kaohsiung
Thai AirAsia X	Bangkok–Don Mueang
Thai Airways International	Bangkok–Suvarnabhumi
Thai Lion Air	Bangkok–Don Mueang, Taipei–Taoyuan
Thai VietJet Air	Bangkok–Suvarnabhumi
Tigerair Taiwan	Kaohsiung, Taipei–Taoyuan
Trinity Airways	Busan, Daegu, Seoul–Incheon
Turkish Airlines	Istanbul
United Airlines	Cebu, Chicago–O'Hare, Denver, Guam, Houston–Intercontinental, Kaohsiung, Koror, Los Angeles, Newark, Saipan, San Francisco; Seasonal: Ulaanbaatar
Uzbekistan Airways	Tashkent
VietJet Air	Hanoi, Ho Chi Minh City
Vietnam Airlines	Da Nang, Hanoi, Ho Chi Minh City
WestJet	Calgary
XiamenAir	Fuzhou, Xiamen
Zipair Tokyo	Bangkok–Suvarnabhumi, Honolulu, Houston–Intercontinental, Kuala Lumpur—International, Los Angeles, Las Vegas (begins 7 January 2027), San Francisco, Seoul–Incheon, Singapore, Toronto–Pearson (begins 2 March 2027), Vancouver; Seasonal: San Jose (CA); Charter: Orlando

== Statistics ==
=== Busiest routes ===
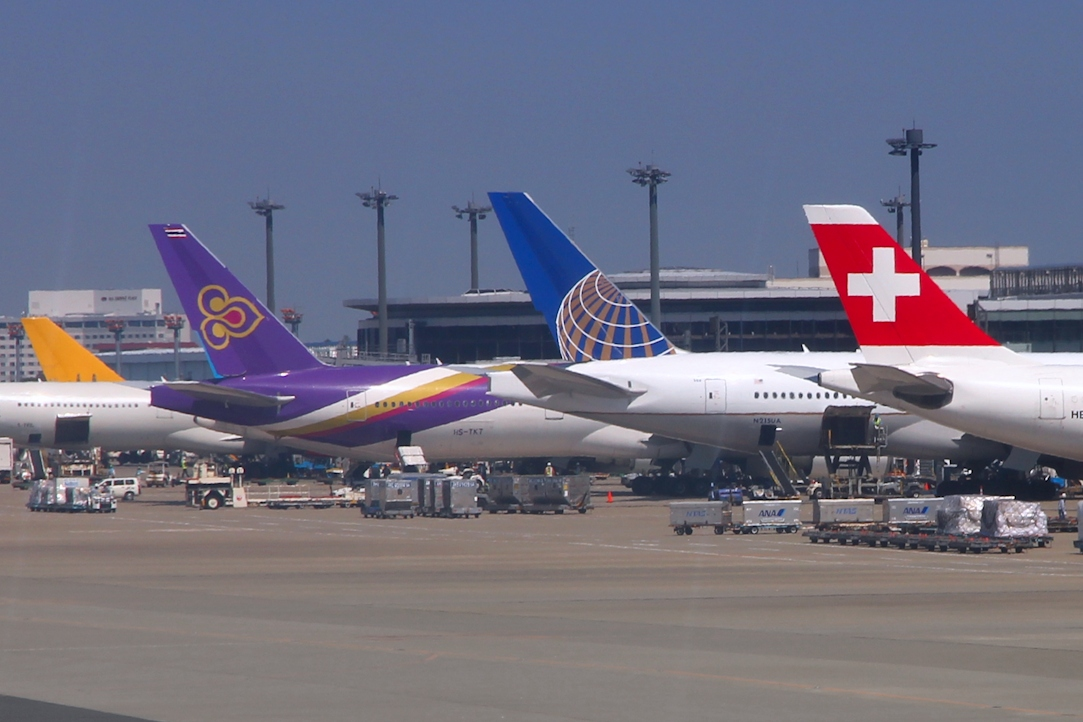
Swiss Air Lines, United Airlines, Thai Airways at Narita

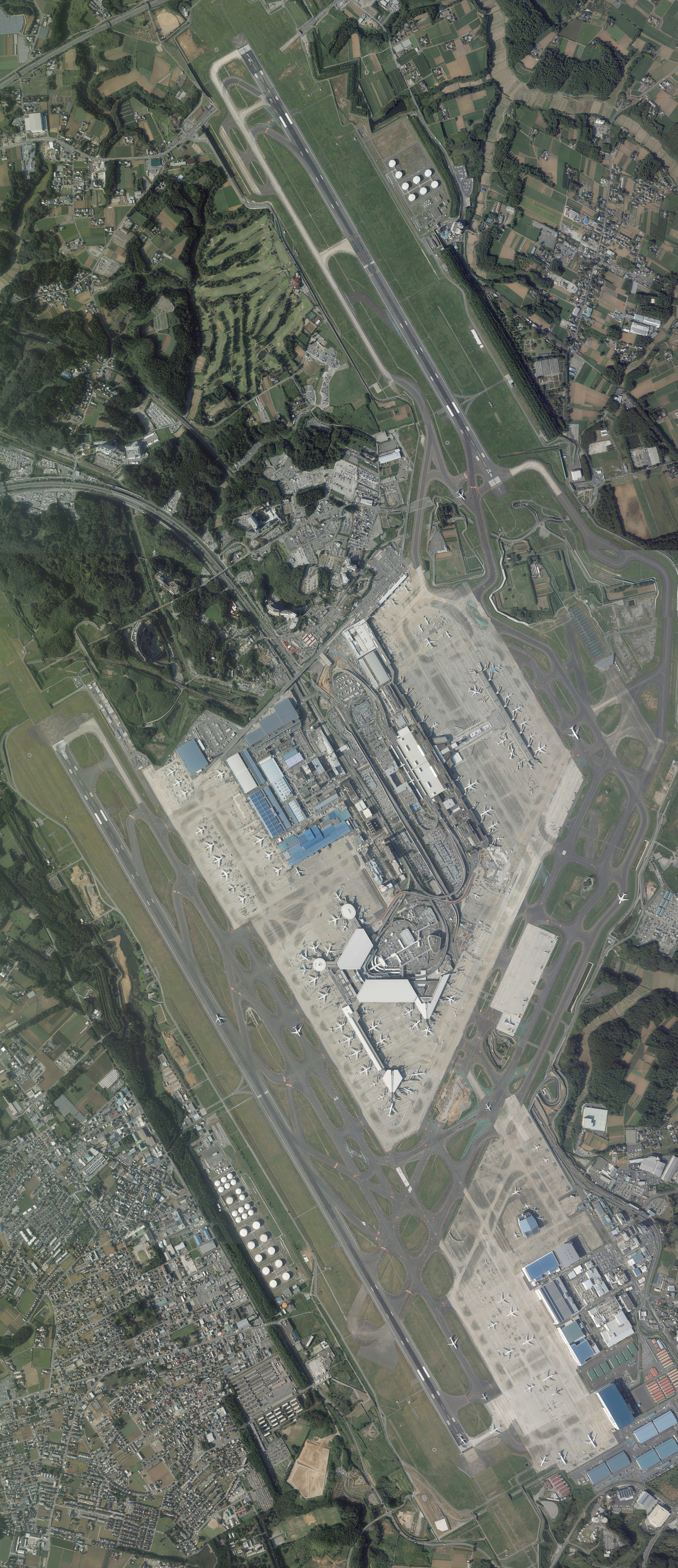
Aerial photograph of Narita International Airport (September 2014)

Busiest domestic routes to and from NRT (2018)
Rank	Airport	Passengers	Carriers
1	Sapporo–Chitose	1,829,795	All Nippon Airways, Japan Airlines, Jetstar Japan, Peach, Spring Japan
2	Fukuoka	1,159,026	All Nippon Airways, Japan Airlines, Jetstar Japan, Peach
3	Osaka–Kansai	770,839	Jetstar Japan, Peach
4	Naha	732,588	All Nippon Airways, Jetstar Japan, Peach
5	Osaka–Itami	465,795	All Nippon Airways, Japan Airlines

Busiest international routes to Europe from NRT, excluding Russia (2017)
Rank	Airport	Passengers	Annual change	Carriers
1	Helsinki	348,259	▲24.5%	Finnair, Japan Airlines
2	Paris–Charles de Gaulle	286,345	▲2.7%	Air France
3	Amsterdam	251,852	▲7.9%	KLM
4	Rome–Fiumicino	196,884	▲2.9%	Alitalia
5	Zurich	144,410	▲1.6%	Swiss International Air Lines
6	Copenhagen	144,374	▲0.8%	Scandinavian
7	London–Heathrow	137,030	▼7.1%	British Airways
8	Frankfurt	129,796	▼33.2%	Japan Airlines
9	Milan–Malpensa	128,467	▼3.5%	Alitalia
10	Düsseldorf	117,887	▲21.2%	All Nippon Airways

=== Airport operation statistics ===
==== Cargo volume (tons) ====
- Domestic
- International

Source: Japanese Ministry of Land, Infrastructure, Transport and Tourism

== Other facilities ==
=== Air traffic control towers ===
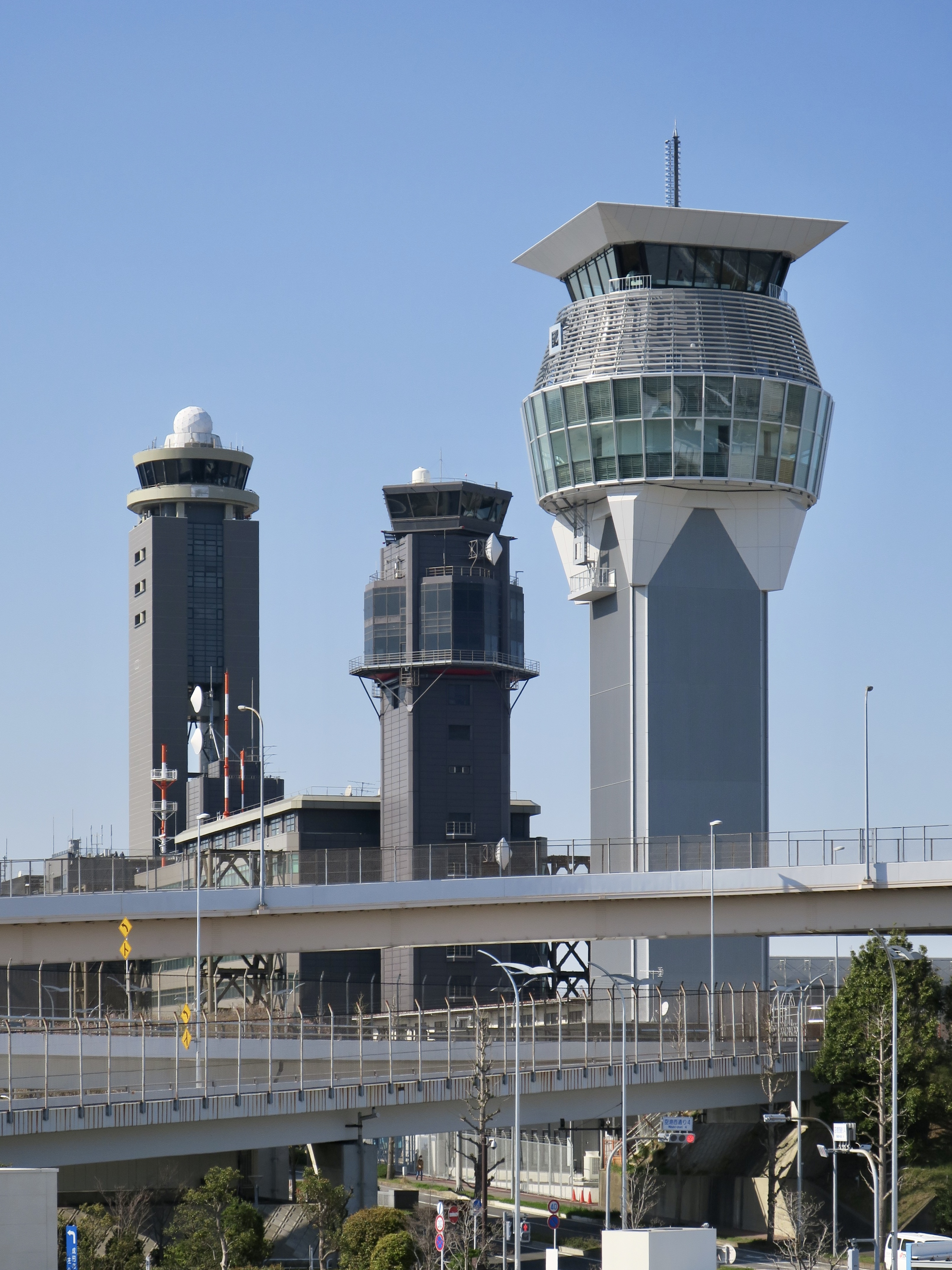
Main control tower, old and new ramp control towers. The middle tower, which served as the airport's main control tower for 25 years from its opening in 1978 until 1993, was occupied and vandalized by protesters on 26 March 1978, contributing to the two-month delay. It was converted into a ramp control tower in 1993, following the construction and opening of a new control tower (left of photo) and was demolished in 2018, transferring ramp control to the new ramp tower (right of photo)

There are three air traffic control towers at Narita. The main control tower and one of the ramp control towers stand on the geographical center of the airport, and another ramp tower is directly above Terminal 2. The main tower is used by Japan Civil Aviation Bureau's ATC, while the ramp towers are used by the NAA officers. The ramp control will be transferred to the new tower in 2020.

=== Jet fuel supply pipelines ===
The airport is connected by a 47 km (29 mi) pipeline to the port of Chiba City and to a fuel terminal in Yotsukaido. The pipeline opened in 1983, and had pumped 130 billion liters of fuel to Narita Airport by its thirtieth anniversary of operations in 2013.

=== Corporate offices ===
Nippon Cargo Airlines (NCA) has its headquarters on the grounds of Narita Airport, in the NCA Line Maintenance Hangar (NCAライン整備ハンガー, NCA Rain Seibi Hangā). Previously NCA had its headquarters on the fourth floor of the Cargo Administration Building (貨物管理ビル, Kamotsu Kanri Biru)).

Japan Airlines operates the Japan Airlines Narita Operation Center (日本航空成田オペレーションセンター, Nihon Kōkū Narita Operēshon Sentā) at Narita Airport. The subsidiary airline JALways once had its headquarters in the building.

=== Airport hotels ===
NRT has one on-site hotel, the Airport Rest House adjacent to Terminal 1. The hotel is operated by TFK, a company that also provides in-flight catering services from an adjacent flight kitchen facility. A capsule hotel opened adjacent to Terminal 2 in July 2014, in order to serve both transit passengers and passengers on early-morning low-cost carrier flights.

== Ground transportation ==
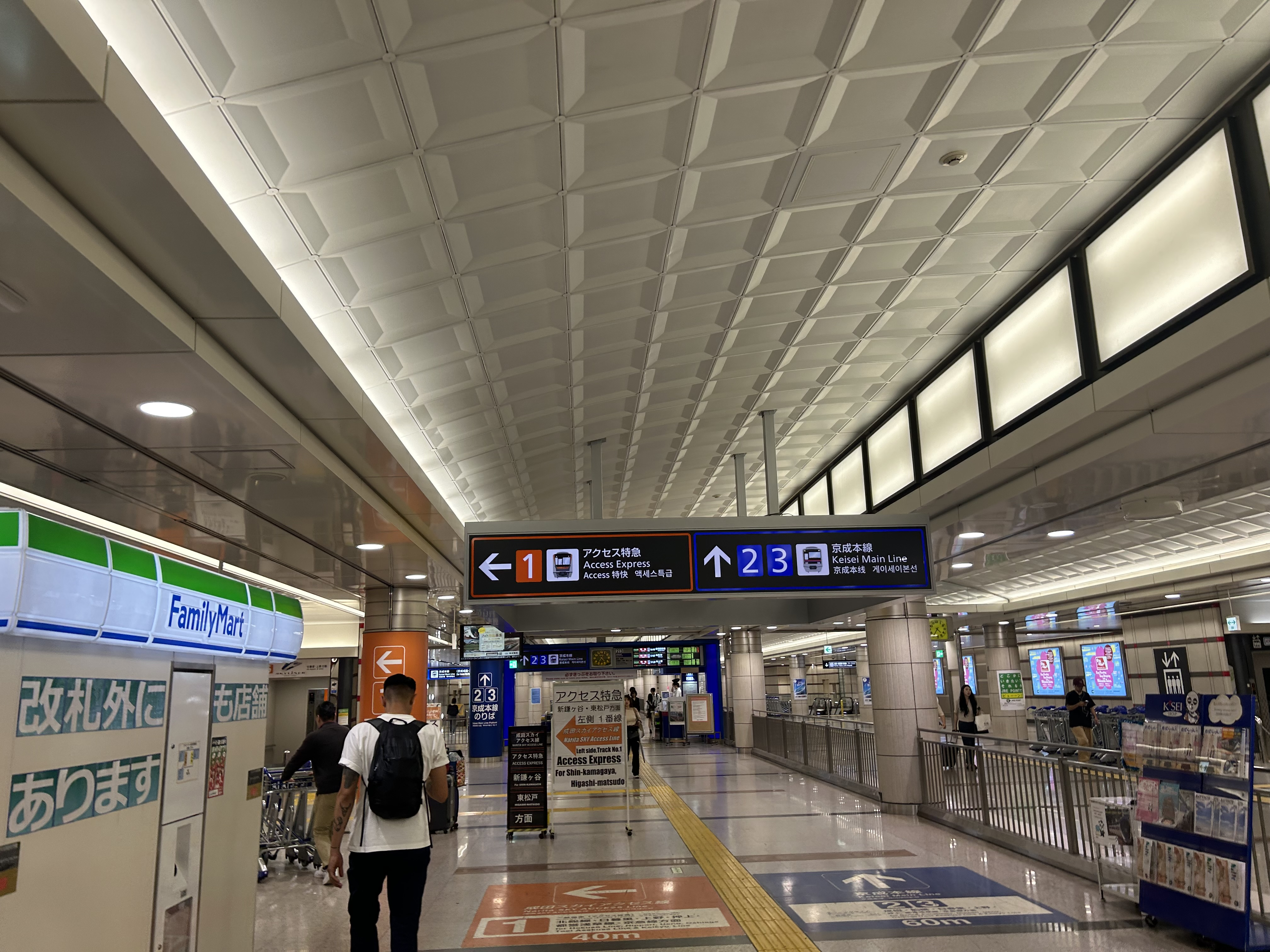
A corridor in Narita Airport Terminal 1 Station

=== Rail ===
==== JR trains ====
Narita Express runs from the airport via the Narita and Sōbu lines to Tokyo Station.

==== Keisei trains ====
Keisei operates a number of trains between the airport and Tokyo: Skyliner is the fastest train between the airport and the Yamanote Line.

Morningliner and Eveningliner trains respectively operate toward Tokyo in the morning and away from Tokyo in the evening, and make intermediate stops at Keisei Narita, Keisei Sakura, Yachiyodai, Keisei Funabashi and Aoto to accommodate commuters.

=== Bus ===
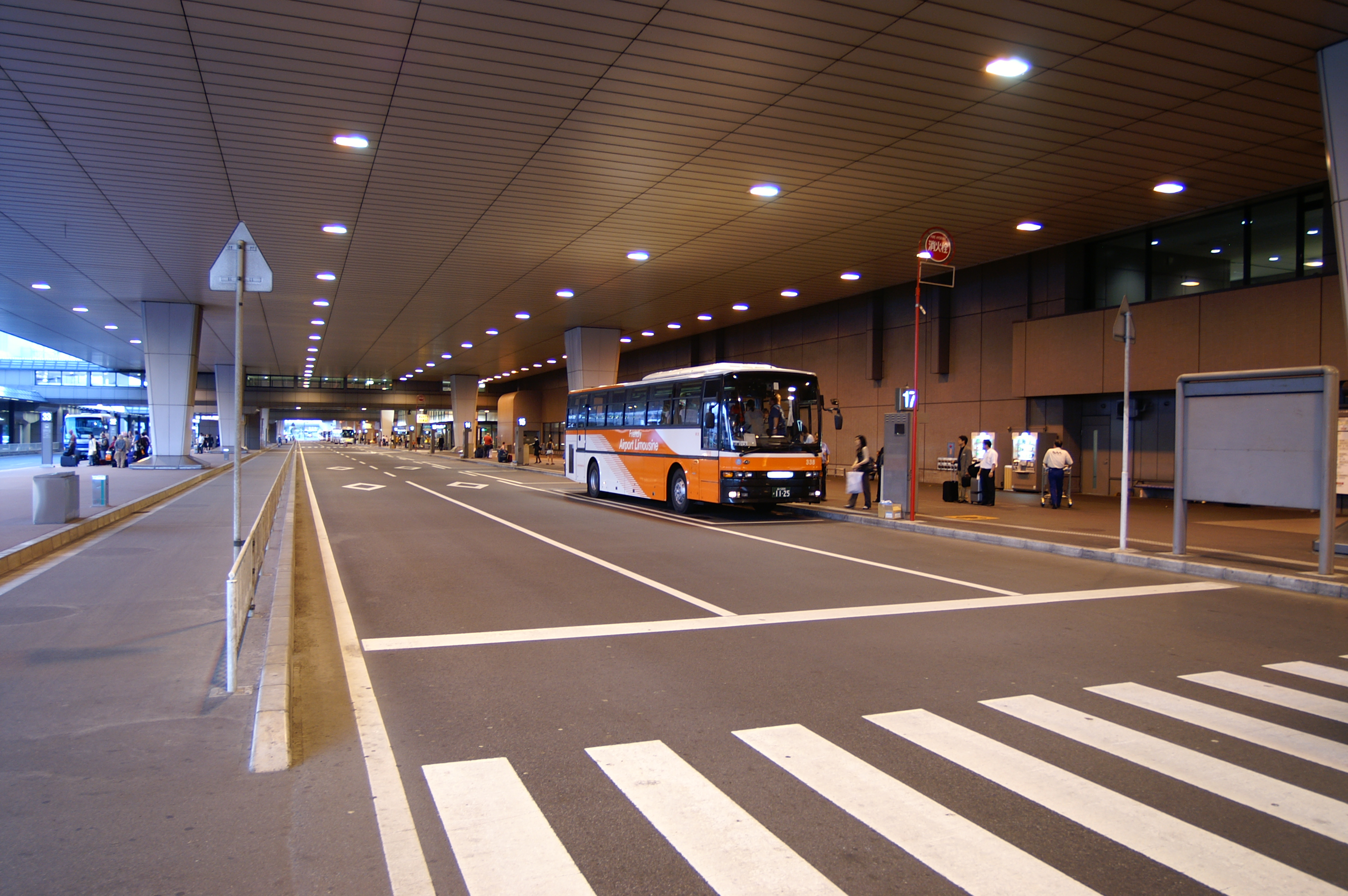
Airport limousine bus

There are regular bus (limousine) services to the Tokyo City Air Terminal in 55 minutes, and major hotels and railway stations in the greater Tokyo area in 35–120 minutes. These are often slower than the trains because of traffic jams. The chief operator of these services is Airport Transport Service under the "Friendly Airport Limousine" brand. Other operators include Keisei Bus, Chiba Kotsu and Narita Airport Transport.

=== Taxi ===
Fixed rate taxi service to Tokyo, Kawasaki, Yokohama, Yokosuka, and Miura is available. Operated by Narita International Airport Taxi Council Members.

=== Helicopter ===
Mori Building City Air Service offered a helicopter charter service between Narita and the Ark Hills complex in Roppongi, taking 35 minute and costing 280,000 yen each way for up to five passengers; however, the service was discontinued on 1 December 2015.

=== Transfer to/from Haneda Airport ===
Haneda Airport is approximately 1.5–2 hours from Narita Airport by rail or bus. By rail, the Keisei Electric Railway runs direct trains between Narita and Haneda in 101 minutes. The Tokyo Monorail runs from Haneda to Hamamatsuchō Station in 15–20 minutes. A short transfer to a JR line train (e.g. Yamanote Line) to Tōkyō Station is required to connect to the Narita Express train to Narita airport. There are also direct buses between the airports operated by Airport Limousine Bus. The journey takes 65–85 minutes or longer depending on traffic.

== Accidents and incidents ==
- 1979: On 30 January, Varig Flight 967, a Boeing 707-323C freighter en route to Rio de Janeiro via Los Angeles, disappeared over the Pacific Ocean approximately 30 minutes after takeoff. The aircraft, carrying six crew members and paintings by artist Manabu Mabe left no trace and no wreckage or bodies were ever recovered. The flight's captain, Gilberto Araújo da Silva, was previously the captain of Varig Flight 820, which had crashed near Paris in 1973.
- 1985: On 22 June, a piece of luggage exploded while being transferred to Air India Flight 301, killing two baggage handlers and injuring four other staff.
- 1997: United Airlines Flight 826 experienced clear-air turbulence after leaving Narita en route for Honolulu. Due to injuries sustained by the passengers and crew, the aircraft had to return. Of the 393 people on board, 102 individuals were injured, with 18 of them being serious. One woman on the flight died of her injuries. (not to be confused with the United Airlines Flight 826 accident that occurred in 1960)
- 2003: 27 January: All Nippon Airways Flight 908 (operated by Air Japan), a Boeing 767 aircraft arriving from Incheon International Airport, South Korea, overshot on Runway 16L/34R after landing. The runway was closed overnight due to necessary investigations and repairs. This was the first such incident of overrunning at Narita and an overnight closing to occur at the airport since its opening in 1978.
- 2008: On 21 September, Air India Flight 307, a Boeing 747-300M (registered VT-EPW nicknamed Shivaji), flying from Tokyo-Narita to Delhi carrying 168 passengers and 14 crew, shut down engine No. 3 after abnormal indication in the instruments. The plane dumped fuel and landed at Tokyo-Narita after declaring emergency. Upon investigation, it was discovered that nozzle guide vanes of the No. 3 engine LPT STG-2 separated and scattered after fracturing due to intergranular corrosion, and this caused the breakage of the nozzle guide vanes and turbine blades of the downstream stages and eventually damaged the engine.
- 2009: On 23 March, FedEx Express Flight 80, an MD-11 aircraft from Guangzhou Baiyun International Airport, China, crashed on Runway 16R/34L during landing, killing both the pilot and co-pilot. Runway 16R/34L, which is required for long-distance flights and heavier aircraft, was closed for a full day due to necessary investigations, repairs and removal of wreckage. This was the first fatal airplane crash to occur at the airport since its opening in 1978.
- 2018:
  - On 5 June, Korean Air Flight 703 suffered damage to the right landing gear after a flight from Incheon International Airport.
  - On 31 July, Air Canada Flight 5, a Boeing 787–8 (reg: C-GHPV) aircraft from Montréal-Trudeau International Airport, entered a closed taxiway upon landing on Runway 16L/34R. No injuries were reported on this incident, but the aircraft was stuck for over five hours, as well as the incident resulting in Runway 16L/34R being closed for over 6 hours.

== See also ==
- Chōfu Airport
- Haneda Airport
- Ibaraki Airport
- Transport in Greater Tokyo
