= Walter Compton =

Walter Compton may refer to:

- Sir Walter Abingdon Compton, 5th Baronet in Hartbury, see Compton baronets
- Walter Ames Compton (1911–1990), American medical doctor, pharmacy researcher, and Japanese sword collector
- Walter Compton (broadcaster) (1912–1959), American radio and television broadcaster and executive
