= Jonas Kamlet =

Chemist and entrepreneur

Jonas Kamlet, Ph.D. (1914 – December 16, 1960) was an American inventor, chemist, and entrepreneur who founded Kamlet Chemical Laboratories in New York City. He developed a glucose test tablet to measure the amount of glucose in urine, a treated strip for pregnancy detection, a fodder for ruminant animals made from newsprint, and a method for synthesizing biuret for use in animal feed, among hundreds of other patents. His wife, Edna Yadven Kamlet Rogers, assisted him in the work of Kamlet Laboratories. She later lived in Sarasota, Florida, where she retained ownership of the Kamlet Laboratory files.

== Early life and education ==
Jonas Kamlet and Edna Yadven met at the age of nine while spending summers at their families' cottages. His family had emigrated from Poland, and hers from Russia. Both were educated in New York City. Kamlet attended the City College of New York, where he majored in chemistry and minored in biology. He graduated at the age of 16 during the Great Depression. Edna Yadven studied at the City University of New York, majoring in biology and minoring in chemistry.

With encouragement from his wife, Kamlet pursued graduate studies and earned his Ph.D. from New York University in 1944. His dissertation was titled "The Synthesis of 5-Dialkylamino-2-chloropentanes: An Investigation into the Mechanism of Olefin Formation by the Alkaline Scission of N,N-Dialkylpiperidinium Salts" (ProQuest, 2005).

== Career ==
The Kamlet Laboratory, located on East 43rd Street in New York City, was founded in 1940 after Jonas Kamlet and Edna Yadven were married. Aside from a small laboratory staff, the couple operated the facility themselves. The laboratory specialized in consulting and developing inventions, which they later sold to interested companies. Although they outsourced certain analytical and development tasks, the Kamlets structured their work so that only they knew the complete production and patenting process.

Each year, the laboratory provided consulting services for up to ten firms, including companies such as Crown Zellerbach and DuPont. Kamlet's widow continued this consulting arrangement after his death until her retirement in her sixties.

=== Patents ===
Kamlet devised a method for producing a tablet that could be used to test for diabetes. He presented the idea to Miles Laboratories, where he collaborated with Walter Ames Compton to develop an effervescent tablet capable of detecting glucose levels in urine. Together, they successfully incorporated reagents into the tablet, which allowed for simple glucose testing. In 1941, Miles Laboratories introduced the product under the name Clinitest, securing a patent for it through a Chicago law firm. The innovation laid the groundwork for modern diabetes test strips.

In collaboration with Miles Laboratories and Kamlet Laboratories, Kamlet also developed a process to extract a previously expensive compound from paper mill waste that was used in the manufacture of vitamin B2. Additionally, he patented a process for producing d-tartaric acid in 1943. In total, he was granted eleven patents assigned to Miles Laboratories.

Kamlet also patented a method for reducing carbohydrates in body fluids. This method used a pill containing compounds that produced a strong exothermic reaction without an external heat source. The pill, composed primarily of citric acid monohydrate, sodium hydroxide, and copper sulfate, generated a color change—cuprous oxide—to indicate the presence of glucose.

Several of Kamlet's inventions focused on animal feed. One used processed newsprint as cattle fodder; when replaced with alfalfa, digestibility increased by 25%. He also developed a "non-protein nitrogen supplement" for livestock feed and patented the use of biuret as a feed additive in 1956. Dow Chemical Company purchased the biuret patent from Kamlet Laboratories for $250,000, including foreign royalties, and later sold it to the Shah of Iran for $1 million.

== Death ==
Jonas Kamlet died on December 16, 1960. He was among the 134 people killed in the 1960 New York mid-air collision between a TWA Lockheed Constellation and a United Airlines DC-8 near Idlewild Airport (now John F. Kennedy International Airport). All 128 people aboard the two aircraft and six people on the ground were killed. The United Airlines plane continued flying for approximately 8.5 miles before crashing into the intersection of Sterling Place and Seventh Avenue in Brooklyn, igniting more than a dozen buildings. Because of poor weather conditions, relatively few pedestrians were outdoors at the time.

Verdicts in the resulting lawsuits, which exceeded $300 million, determined that United Airlines was responsible for 61 percent of the claims, Trans World Airlines for 15 percent, and the U.S. government for 24 percent, as FAA controllers had been directing the planes' instrument landing approaches. In addition to compensation for the families of passengers and crew, local residents also received settlements from United Airlines. Kamlet's widow sued successfully, and the New York Supreme Court upheld her judgment, awarding her $600,000 plus $45,000 in interest.

Following her husband's death, Edna Kamlet continued operating the laboratory until her retirement around 1979. In Sarasota, Florida, the Jonas Kamlet Library at the Sarasota Opera House was named in his honor. His collected papers, journals, and research materials are held at the University of South Florida Tampa Library. The Kamlet Collection documents significant developments in chemistry from 1940 through the mid-1960s and serves as a valuable resource for students and researchers in the field.
