= Zipair Tokyo =

Japanese low-cost airline

ZIPAIR Tokyo Inc. 株式会社 ZIPAIR Tokyo Kabushiki-kaisha Jippu-ea Tōkyō

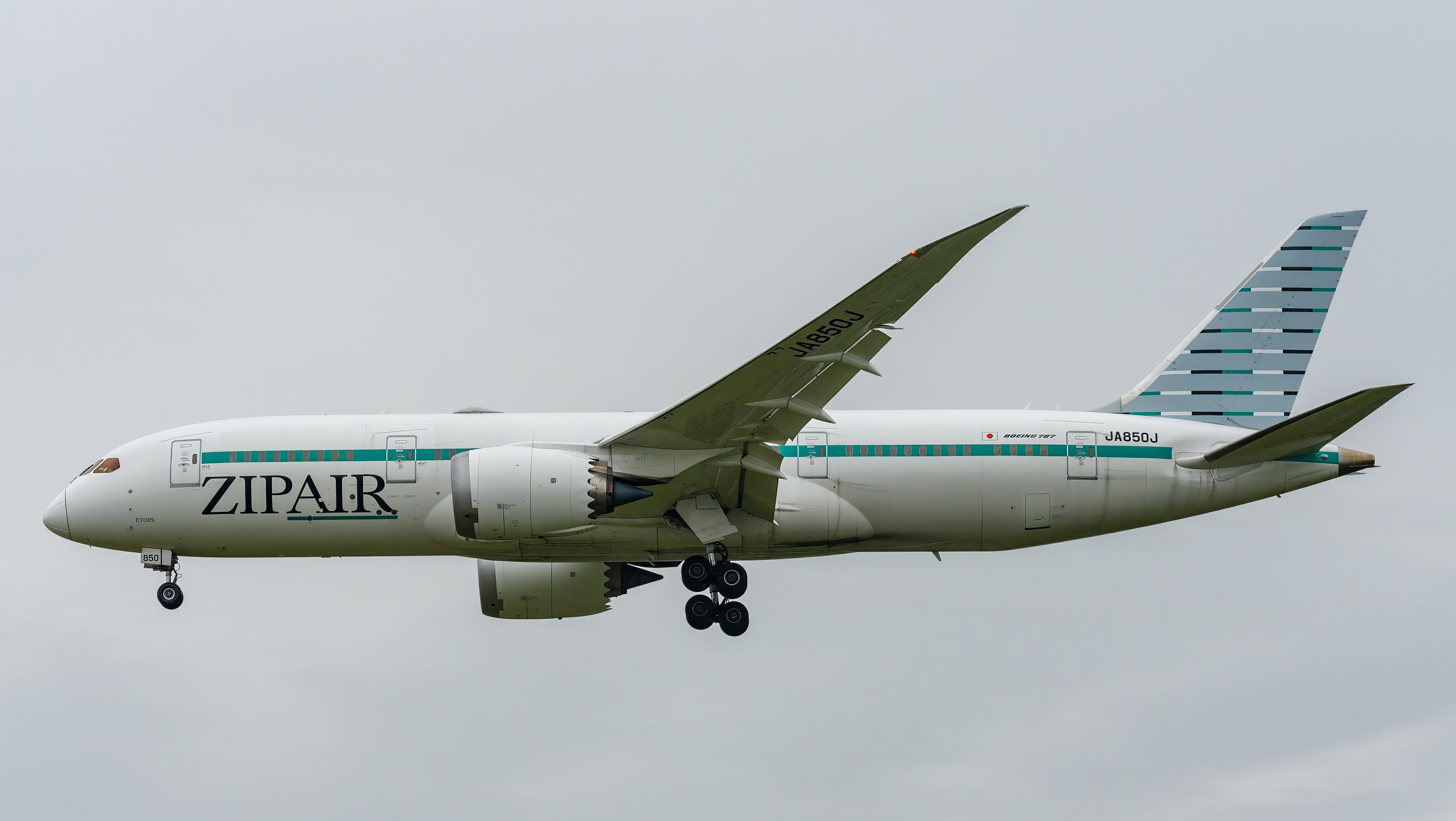
- Zipair Boeing 787-8
IATA	ICAO	Call sign
ZG	TZP	ZIPPY
- Founded: July 31, 2018; 8 years ago
- Commenced operations: June 3, 2020; 6 years ago
- Operating bases: Narita International Airport
- Frequent-flyer program: Zipair Point Club
- Fleet size: 8
- Destinations: 10
- Parent company: JAL Group
- Headquarters: Narita, Chiba, Japan
- Key people: Hiroo Iwakoshi (Chairman); Yasuhiro Fukada (President & CEO)
- Employees: 815 (January 2025)
- Website: www.zipair.net/en

ZIPAIR, legally ZIPAIR Tokyo Inc. (株式会社 ZIPAIR Tokyo, Kabushiki-gaisha Jippu-ea Tōkyō; styled ZIPAIR Tokyo), is a Japanese low-cost airline headquartered on the grounds of Narita International Airport in Narita, Chiba Prefecture. Initially founded in 2018, the airline is a wholly owned subsidiary of Japan Airlines, from which it leases some of its Boeing 787 Dreamliner fleet. Operations launched on June 3, 2020, as a cargo-only airline due to restrictions on passenger traffic related to the COVID-19 pandemic, and passenger operations launched on October 16, 2020.

== History ==
=== Foundation ===
Japan Airlines (JAL) announced in May 14, 2018 that it planned to launch a new international low-cost carrier in 2020, which was to compete with other Asian carriers attempting to expand into the Japanese market, such as AirAsia X. JAL established a wholly owned subsidiary legally incorporated as T.B.L. Co., Ltd. (株式会社ティー・ビー・エル, Kabushiki-gaisha Tī Bī Eru; standing for "To Be Launched"), in July that year. It was estimated that the airline would commence operation in time for the 2020 Summer Olympics.

In March 2019, the brand of the new carrier was named "ZIPAIR Tokyo", referencing the words "ZIP", which represents speed, and alluding to traveling to different postal areas "ZIP Code". Finally, the word "Tokyo" was added to the name, as the airline will be based in one of the world's leading cultural capitals, where trends and creativity are born and shared with the world. Subsequently, T.B.L. was renamed "ZIPAIR Tokyo Inc." ZIPAIR's planned operations consisted of international flights from Narita International Airport to Bangkok and Seoul, launching on May 14 and July 1, 2020, respectively with Boeing 787-8 aircraft transferred from JAL. The airline planned to launch additional destinations in Asia, while flights to the United States were planned to be added by 2021.

=== Development since 2020 ===
In early 2020, the impact of the COVID-19 pandemic on aviation disrupted ZIPAIR's plans for its launch of operations, with Thailand banning all incoming passenger flights from April 4, 2020, and the Japanese government introducing strict border enforcement measures. Under these circumstances, ZIPAIR announced on April 9, 2020 that its launch of service would be postponed until further notice, although later that month the airline applied with the U.S. Department of Transportation for the operation of a route to Honolulu to begin on October 25, 2020. On May 21, 2020, it was announced that the airline had submitted an application to the Japanese authority for the launch of cargo flights between Tokyo and Bangkok to meet the needs for air cargo during the suspension of passenger flights. ZIPAIR proceeded to launch services on June 3, 2020, initially as a cargo airline, with its fleet of Boeing 787-8 aircraft.

Following its launch as a cargo-only airline, ZIPAIR inaugurated its passenger services on October 16, 2020. The following month, on November 20, 2020, the airline announced the details of its first route to the United States, with flights between Tokyo Narita and Honolulu launching on December 19, 2020. On July 20, 2021, the airline announced a new service between Tokyo Narita and Singapore, with flights launching on September 7, 2021. On October 28, 2021, the airline added a third aircraft to its fleet with a Boeing 787-8 transferred from JAL. On November 12, 2021, the airline announced a new service between Tokyo Narita and Los Angeles International Airport to begin on December 25, 2021.

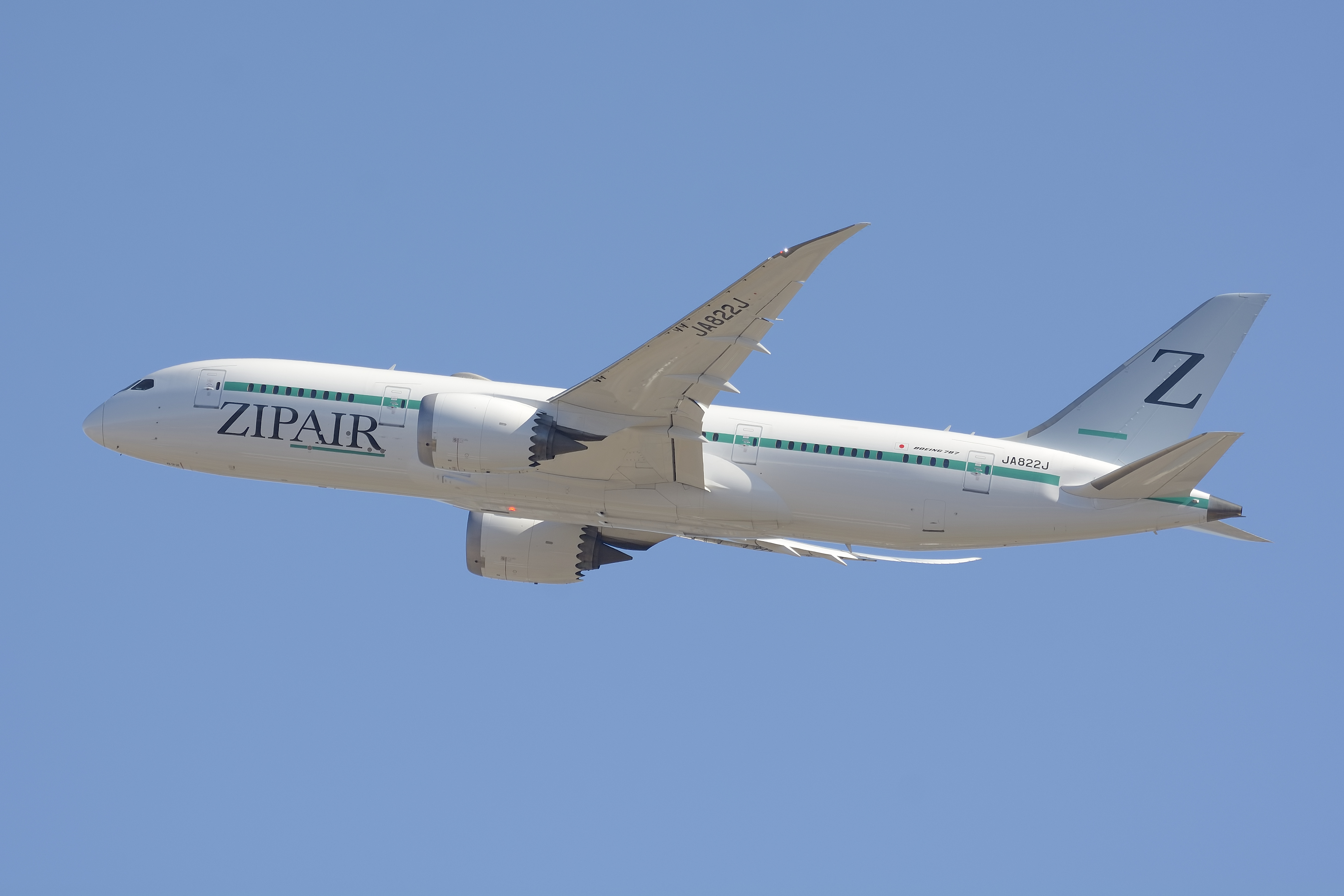
ZIPAIR's previous livery included a large Z on the tail fin.

In June 2022, ZIPAIR announced that the large letter Z on the tail fin of its livery would be replaced with a green geometric pattern to avoid misunderstandings, as the letter has been used as a military symbol by the Russian Armed Forces during Russia's invasion of Ukraine. Also in June 2022, the airline announced a new service between Tokyo Narita and San Jose International Airport to launch during December 2022, before subsequently specifying December 12, 2022 as the launch date for the service.

On February 21, 2023, ZIPAIR announced plans to begin services to San Francisco and Manila during the year, as well as to increase its fleet to seven aircraft. It later announced on April 6, 2023, that it would begin service to San Francisco International Airport on June 2, 2023. Details of its Manila service were revealed on April 28, 2023, with flights to Ninoy Aquino International Airport beginning on July 1, 2023. On November 8, 2023, the airline announced plans to add an eighth aircraft in January 2024, and to launch a new service to Vancouver in March 2024, later specifying March 13, 2024 as the launch date of the service.

In early 2024, ZIPAIR announced its plans for 2025 involving the increase of its fleet size to ten, but did not expect to launch any new destinations during 2024 beyond Vancouver. On October 9, 2024, the airline announced the launch of flights to Houston's George Bush Intercontinental Airport to begin on March 4, 2025. On March 19, 2025, the airline formalized plans to receive ten Boeing 787-9s from Japan Airlines starting in 2027.

== Destinations ==
As of October 2026, ZIPAIR flies (or has flown) to the following destinations:

Country	City	Airport	Start date	End date	Notes	Refs
Canada	Vancouver	Vancouver International Airport	13 March 2024	Present		
Japan	Tokyo	Narita International Airport	3 June 2020(Cargo Flight); 16 October 2020(Passenger Flight)	Present	Base	
Malaysia	Kuala Lumpur	Kuala Lumpur International Airport	20 October 2026	Present		
Singapore	Singapore	Changi Airport	7 September 2021	Present		
South Korea	Seoul	Incheon International Airport	12 September 2020	Present		
Thailand	Bangkok	Suvarnabhumi Airport	3 June 2020	Present		
Philippines	Manila	Ninoy Aquino International Airport	1 July 2023	28 March 2026	Terminated	
United States	Honolulu	Daniel K. Inouye International Airport	19 December 2020	Present		
United States	Houston	George Bush Intercontinental Airport	4 March 2025	Present		
United States	Los Angeles	Los Angeles International Airport	25 December 2021	Present		
United States	Orlando	Orlando International Airport ^{Charter}	23 February 2026	10 March 2026	Terminated	
United States	San Francisco	San Francisco International Airport	2 June 2023	Present		
United States	San Jose	San Jose International Airport	12 December 2022	Present		

== Fleet ==
=== Current fleet ===
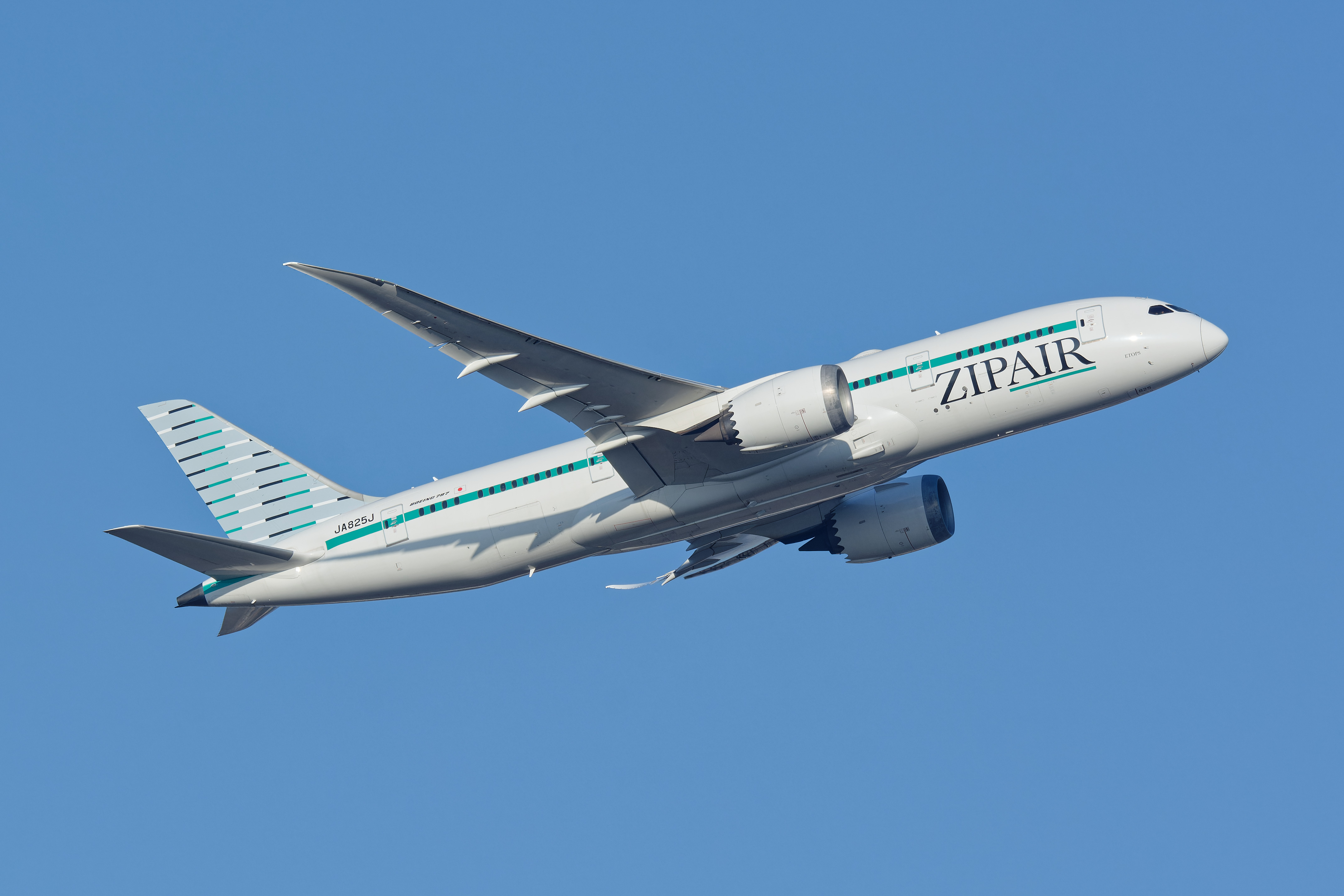
ZIPAIR Boeing 787-8

As of July 2026, Zipair Tokyo operates the following aircraft:

ZIPAIR fleet
Aircraft	In service	Orders	Passengers			Notes
Aircraft	In service	Orders	J	Y	Total	Notes
Boeing 787-8	8	2	18	272	290	6 leased from Japan Airlines.
Boeing 787-9	—	10	TBA			Deliveries from FY2027. To be leased from Japan Airlines.
Total	8	12				

=== Former fleet ===
As of August 2025, ZIPAIR Tokyo operated 8 Boeing 787-8.

== Service ==
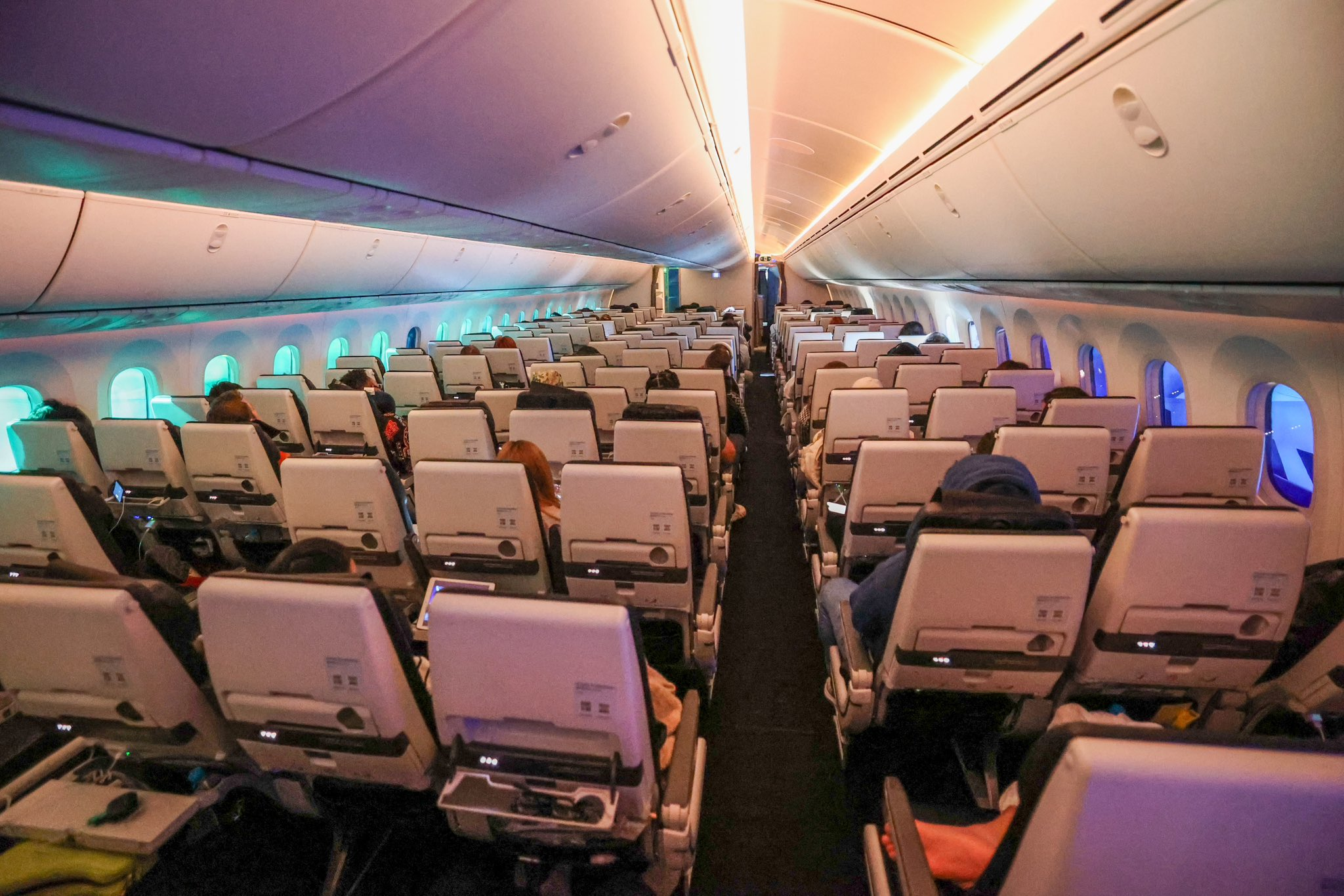
Standard seat cabin aboard a ZIPAIR Boeing 787-8

=== Seat Types and Fares ===
ZIPAIR offers two types of seats on their flights: ZIP Full Flat, and standard.

As a low-cost carrier, ZIPAIR charges fees for extra services such as additional baggage allowances, and a buy on board service for in-flight catering, amenities, and goods, regardless of the type of seat selected. The airline also provides streamable in-flight entertainment to personal devices instead of in-seat screens, and complimentary Wi-Fi Internet access.

== See also ==
- List of low-cost airlines in Japan
