= 1960 New York mid-air collision =

Aviation disaster in New York City

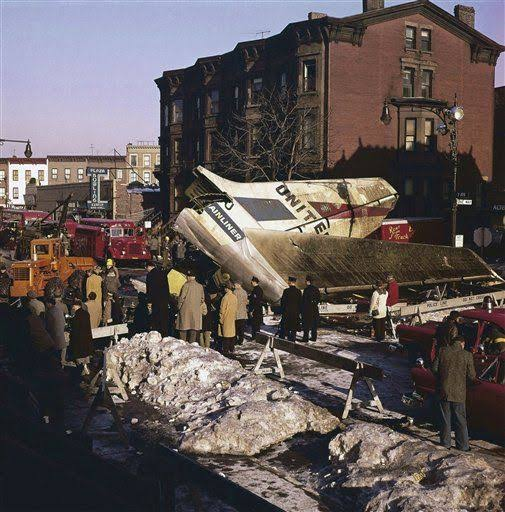
- The crash site of the United Air Lines DC-8 in Park Slope, Brooklyn

Accident
- Date: December 16, 1960
- Summary: Mid-air collision
- Site: Miller Field, Near New York City, U.S.; 40°34′07″N 74°07′19″W
- Total fatalities: 134
- Total survivors: 0 (initial survivors 1 but died later from the impact)

First aircraft
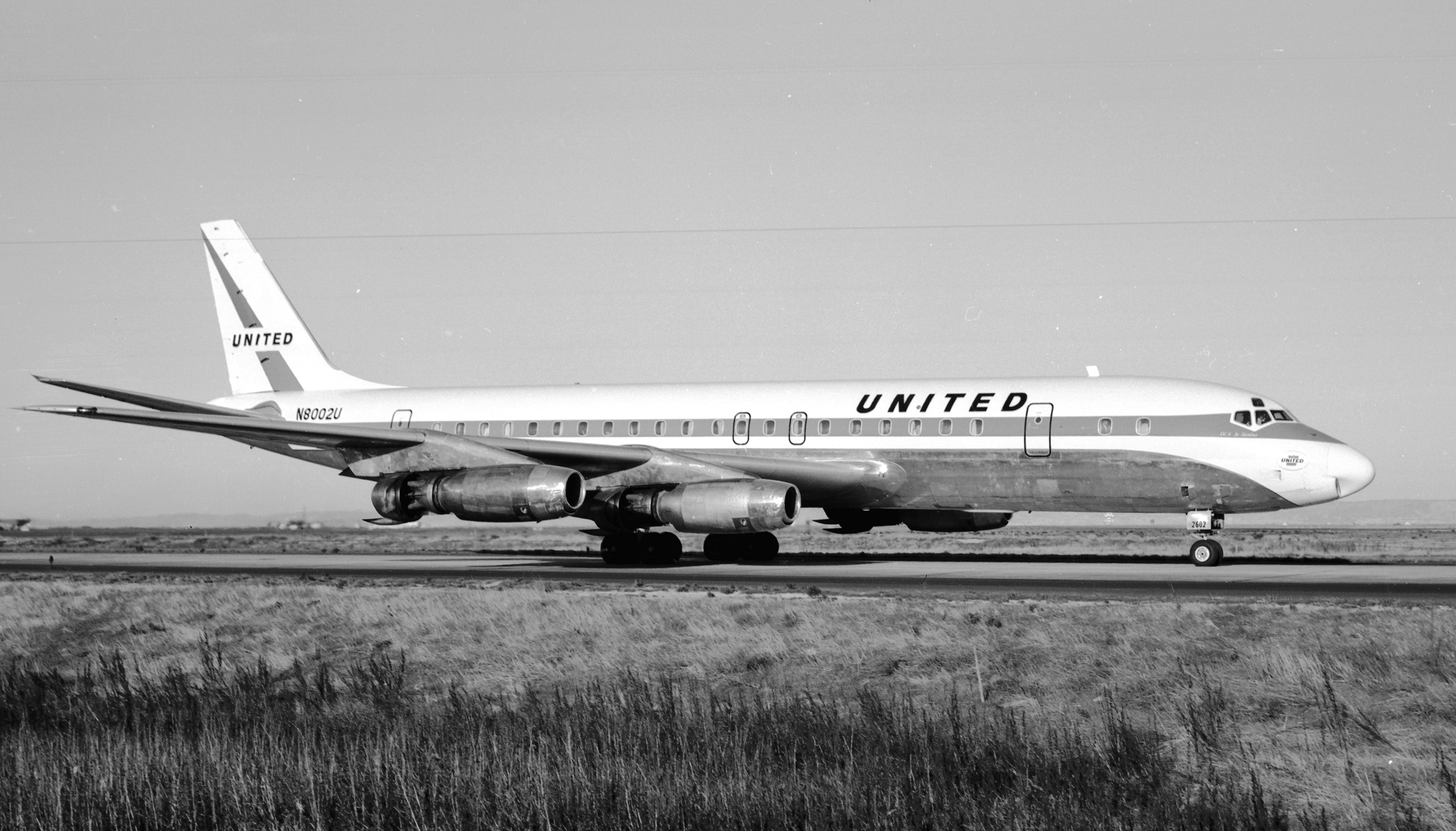
- A United Air Lines Douglas DC-8 that was similar to the aircraft involved in the accident.
- Type: Douglas DC-8-11
- Name: Mainliner Will Rogers
- Operator: United Air Lines
- IATA flight No.: UA826
- ICAO flight No.: UAL826
- Call sign: UNITED 826
- Registration: N8013U
- Flight origin: Chicago-O'Hare International Airport, IL
- Destination: Idlewild Airport, New York City
- Occupants: 84
- Passengers: 77
- Crew: 7
- Fatalities: 84
- Survivors: 0

Second aircraft
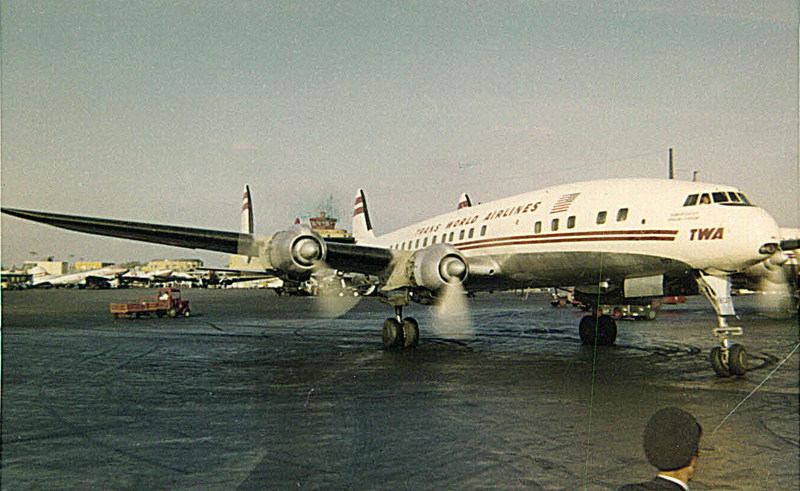
- N6907C, the Lockheed L-1049A Super Constellation involved in the accident, in 1957
- Type: Lockheed L-1049A Super Constellation
- Name: Star of Sicily
- Operator: Trans World Airlines
- IATA flight No.: TW266
- ICAO flight No.: TWA266
- Call sign: TWA 266
- Registration: N6907C
- Flight origin: Dayton International Airport, Dayton, Ohio
- Stopover: Port Columbus International Airport, Ohio
- Destination: LaGuardia Airport, New York
- Occupants: 44
- Passengers: 39
- Crew: 5
- Fatalities: 44
- Survivors: 0

Ground casualties
- Ground fatalities: 6

On December 16, 1960, a United Air Lines Douglas DC-8 heading for Idlewild Airport (now John F. Kennedy International Airport) in New York City collided in midair with a TWA Lockheed L-1049 Super Constellation descending toward LaGuardia Airport. The Constellation crashed on Miller Field in Staten Island and the DC-8 in Park Slope, Brooklyn, killing all 128 aboard the two aircraft and six people on the ground. The accident was the world's deadliest aviation disaster at the time, and remained the deadliest accident in the history of United Airlines until the Flight 232 crash in 1989.

The accident became known as the Park Slope plane crash or the Miller Field crash, named after the two sites where the aircraft landed. The accident was also the first hull loss and first fatal accident involving a Douglas DC-8. This crash was the first accident where investigators relied on flight recorders ("black boxes") to find a cause.

== Aircraft and crews ==
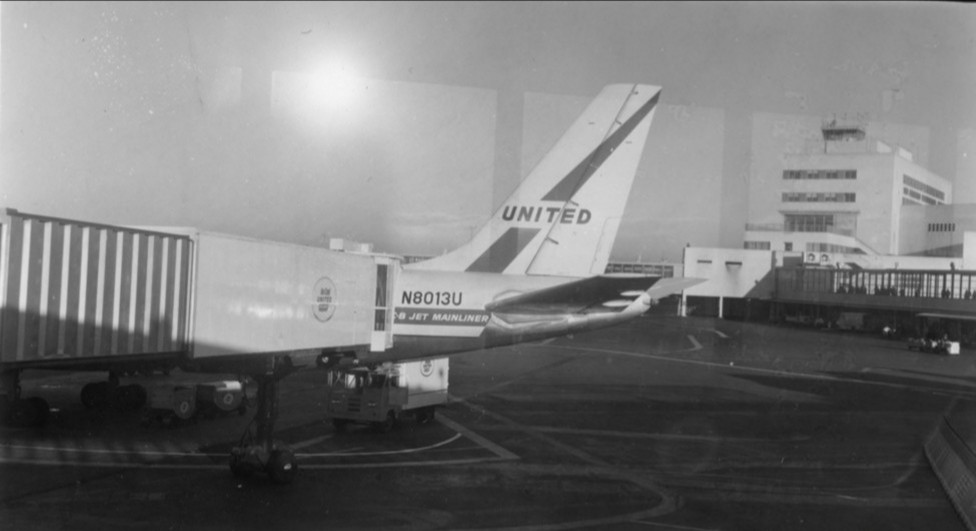
The tail assembly of N8013U, the Douglas DC-8 involved in the collision.

United Air Lines Flight 826, Mainliner Will Rogers, registered as N8013U, was a DC-8-11 carrying 77 passengers and 7 crew members from O'Hare International Airport in Chicago to Idlewild Airport in Queens. The crew consisted of Captain Robert Sawyer (age 46), First Officer Robert Fiebing (40), Flight Engineer Richard Pruitt (30) and four stewardesses. Captain Sawyer was a highly experienced pilot, having accumulated 19,100 flight hours, of which 344 were in the DC-8. First Officer Fiebing had accumulated 8,400 flight hours, of which 416 were in the DC-8. Flight Engineer Pruitt had accumulated 8,500 flight hours, of which 379 were in the DC-8.

Trans World Airlines Flight 266, Star of Sicily, registered as N6907C, was a Super Constellation carrying 39 passengers and 5 crew members from Dayton and Columbus, Ohio, to LaGuardia Airport in Queens. The crew consisted of Captain David Wollam (age 39), First Officer Dean Bowen (32), Flight Engineer LeRoy "Lee" Rosenthal (30) and two stewardesses, Margaret Gernat and Patricia Post. Captain Wollam had accumulated 14,583 flight hours, 267 of which were in the Constellation. First Officer Bowen had accumulated 6,411 flight hours, of which 268 were on the Constellation. Flight Engineer Rosenthal had accumulated 3,561 flight hours, of which 204 were in the Constellation. Star of Sicily's sister ship N6902C, Star of the Seine, was destroyed in another mid-air collision with a United Air Lines flight in 1956.

== Background ==
Flight paths of the two aircraft

At 10:21 a.m. EST, United 826 advised ARINC radio that one of its VOR receivers was inoperative, and the message was relayed to United Air Lines maintenance. However, air-traffic control (ATC) was not informed that the aircraft had only one operational receiver, which presented difficulty for the pilots of flight 826 to identify the PRESTON intersection, beyond which it had not received clearance.

At 10:25 a.m., ATC issued a revised clearance for the flight to shorten its route to the PRESTON holding point (near Laurence Harbor, New Jersey) by 12 miles (19 km). That clearance included holding instructions (a standard "racetrack" holding pattern) for Flight 826 when it arrived at the PRESTON intersection. Flight 826 was expected to reduce its speed before reaching PRESTON to a standard holding speed of 210 knots (240 mph; 390 km/h) or lower. However, the aircraft was estimated to be traveling at 301 knots (346 mph; 557 km/h) when it collided with the TWA plane, several miles beyond the PRESTON clearance limit.

During the investigation, United Air Lines claimed that the Colts Neck VOR beacon was unreliable. PRESTON was the point where airway V123—the 050-radial off the Robbinsville VOR—crossed the Solberg 120-degree radial and the Colts Neck 346-degree radial. However, the Civil Aeronautics Board's final report found no problem with the Colts Neck VOR.

The prevailing conditions were light rain and fog, which had been preceded by snowfall.

== Collision and ground impacts ==
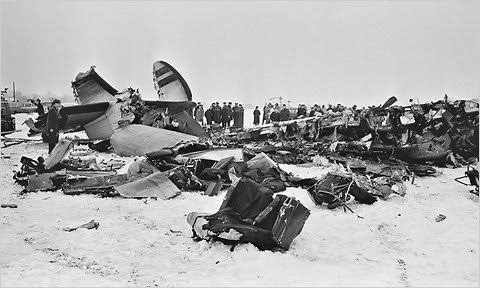
The crash site of the TWA Super Constellation, TWA 266, in Miller Field, Staten Island.

Locations of the crash sites in New York City

According to the DC-8's flight data recorder, the aircraft was 12 miles (19 km) off course, and for 81 seconds it descended at 3,600 feet per minute (18 m/s) while slowing from more than 400 knots (460 mph; 740 km/h) to 301 knots (346 mph; 557 km/h) at the time of the collision. The Constellation was in a 22 degree left bank and was beginning to descend to 1,500ft.

The DC-8’s No.4 rightmost engine struck the Constellation’s upraised right wing before tearing through the forward passenger cabin of the Constellation just ahead of its wings, tearing apart a portion of the fuselage, simultaneously the DC-8’s left wing and lower fuselage cut through the Constellation's triple tail. Moments later the tail's structural integrity was compromised and the entire tail section broke away. The Constellation entered a dive, with debris continuing to fall as it disintegrated during its spiral to the ground.

The initial impact tore the DC-8's engine from its pylon. Having lost one engine and a large part of the right wing, the DC-8 remained airborne for another 90 seconds.

The DC-8 crashed into the Park Slope section of Brooklyn at the intersection of Seventh Avenue and Sterling Place (40°40′38″N 73°58′25″W), scattering wreckage and setting fire to ten brownstone apartment buildings, the Pillar of Fire Church, the McCaddin Funeral Home, a Chinese laundry and a delicatessen. Six people on the ground were killed.

The crash left the remains of the DC-8 pointing southeast toward a large open field at Prospect Park, blocks from its crash site. An occupant in one of the affected apartment buildings said that his family survived because they were in the only room of their apartment that was not destroyed. The crash left a trench covering most of the length of the middle of Sterling Place. Witnesses thought that a bomb had detonated or that a building's boiler had exploded.

The TWA plane crashed onto the northwest corner of Miller Field at 40.57°N 74.103°W, with some sections of the aircraft landing in New York Harbor. At least one passenger fell into a tree before the wreckage hit the ground.

There was no radio contact with traffic controllers from either plane after the collision, although LaGuardia had begun tracking an incoming, fast-moving, unidentified plane from Preston toward the LaGuardia "Flatbush" outer marker.

== Investigation ==
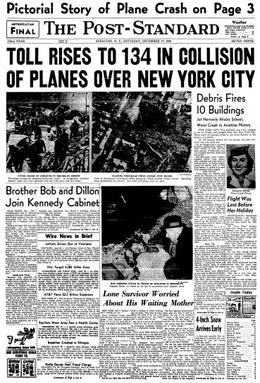
Front page of Syracuse Post-Standard on December 17, 1960

The likely cause of the accident was identified in a report by the US Civil Aeronautics Board:

United Flight 826 proceeded beyond its clearance limit and the confines of the airspace allocated to the flight by Air Traffic Control. A contributing factor was the high speed of the United DC-8 as it approached the Preston intersection, coupled with the change of clearance which reduced the en-route distance along Victor 123 by approximately 11 miles (9.6 nmi; 18 km).

The report notes "various steps to improve and strengthen the efficiency and effectiveness of its Air Traffic Control System" based on the crash investigation. Listed steps include better reporting of malfunctioning communications/navigation equipment, retrofitting airplanes with distance measuring equipment, improved handoff techniques for air traffic control, and additional speed rules when approaching a destination airport.

== Victims ==
The only person to initially survive the crash was Stephen Baltz, an 11-year-old boy from Wilmette, Illinois. He was traveling unaccompanied on Flight 826 to spend Christmas in Yonkers with relatives. He was thrown from the plane into a snowbank, where his burning clothing was extinguished. Although alive and conscious, he was severely burned and had inhaled burning fuel. Baltz died of pneumonia the next day.

Other notable victims included chemist Jonas Kamlet, who was on Flight 826. Mountaineer Sir Edmund Hillary, known for being the first person to reach the summit of Mount Everest, was also booked onto Flight 826 but arrived too late to board. Highlights magazine lost much of their leadership in the crash.

== Legacy ==
In 2010, on the 50th anniversary of the accident, a memorial to the 134 victims of the two crashes was unveiled in Green-Wood Cemetery, Brooklyn. The cemetery is the site of the common grave containing the remains of those who could not be identified.

The collision is covered in "Collision Course," the fifth episode of the first season of The Weather Channel documentary series Why Planes Crash.

== See also ==
- 1949 Port Washington mid-air collision – Another mid-air collision over Long island.
- 1956 Grand Canyon mid-air collision – Another mid-air collision, also involving United Air Lines aircraft and Trans World Airlines Lockheed Super Constellation
