= Walter Ames Compton =

American CEO of Miles Laboratories and Japanese sword collector (1911–1990)

- Born: Walter Ames Compton; April 22, 1911; Elkhart, Indiana, U.S.
- Died: October 11, 1990 (aged 79); Elkhart, Indiana, U.S.
- Education: Princeton University Harvard University
- Occupations: Pharmacy researcher, Japanese sword collector

Walter Ames Compton; (April 22, 1911 – October 11, 1990), was an American medical doctor, pharmacy researcher, and avid Japanese sword collector. He was the president of Miles Laboratories. Because he bought and returned several Japanese sword such as Bizen-Saburou Kunimune (備前三郎国宗) to Terukuni jinja, one of the National Treasures of Japan, he received 4th Class of Order of the Rising Sun from Government of Japan. Compton was an honorary member of The Society for Preservation of Japanese Art Swords.

== Relevant literature ==
- Compton, Walter Ames (1973), Serving needs in health and nutrition : the story of Miles Laboratories, Inc., New York: Newcomen Society in North America, OCLC 723098
- Christie's (31 March 1992), Japanese Swords & Sword Fittings from the Collection of Walter A. Compton, part I, Christie's Auction Catalog, NY, OCLC 908835316
- Christie's (22 October 1992), Japanese Swords & Sword Fittings from the Collection of Walter A. Compton, part II, Christie's Auction Catalog, NY, OCLC 171299854
- Christie's (17 December 1992), Japanese Swords & Sword Fittings from the Collection of Walter A. Compton, part III, Christie's Auction Catalog, NY
- Compton, Walter A. (1976), Nippon-tō art swords of Japan: the Walter A. Compton Collection, New York: Japan Society, ISBN 0913304050, OCLC 908835380
- Izzard, Sebastian., ed. (1992), One hundred masterpieces from the collection of Dr. Walter A. Compton : Japanese swords, sword fittings, and other accoutrements, New York, NY: Christie, Manson & Woods International, ISBN 1880907003
- Mino, Yutaka; Robinson, James (1983), A collector's choices : Asian art from the collection of Dr. Walter A. Compton, Indianapolis, Ind.: Indianapolis Museum of Art, ISBN 0936260084
