= Air Busan =

Low-cost airline of South Korea

AIR BUSAN 에어부산 에어釜山

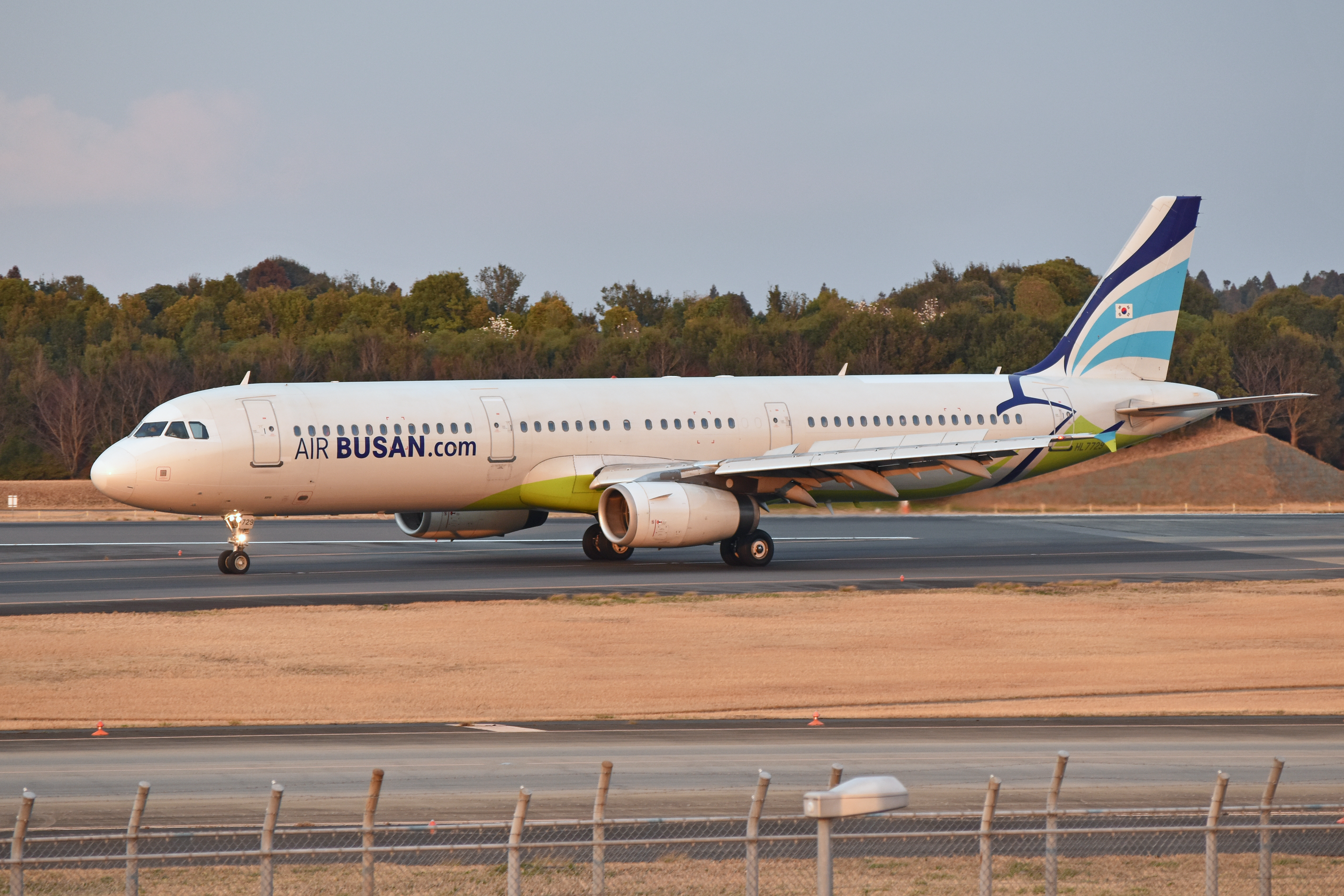
- Air Busan Airbus A321-200
IATA	ICAO	Call sign
BX	ABL	AIR BUSAN
- Founded: 31 August 2007; 19 years ago
- Commenced operations: 27 October 2008; 17 years ago
- Hubs: Gimhae International Airport
- Frequent-flyer program: Asiana Club
- Fleet size: 21
- Destinations: 35
- Parent company: Asiana Airlines
- Traded as: KRX: 298690
- Headquarters: Beomcheon-dong, Busanjin-gu, Busan, South Korea
- Key people: Ahn Byeong-seok (CEO)
- Website: www.airbusan.com

Air Busan Co., Ltd., operating as Air Busan (Korean: 에어부산; Hanja: 에어釜山) is a low-cost airline based in Busanjin-gu, Busan, South Korea. It is a subsidiary of Asiana Airlines. The airline began its operation in 2007 as Busan International Airlines Company (Korean: 부산국제항공; Hanja: 釜山國際航空); it launched service in October 2008. Air Busan is South Korea's third-largest low-cost airline, carrying 4.5 million domestic and 3.6 million international passengers in 2018. Air Busan has grown international passenger traffic by 122% over the past three years, while domestic traffic has grown by 38%.

== History ==
Busan International Airlines Co., Ltd. was established on 31 August 2007. In February the following year, the corporate name was changed to Air Busan Co., Ltd. and an investment agreement was signed by the city of Busan and Asiana Airlines. In April 2008, the company ordered its first aircraft, five Boeing 737s. Two months later, the company was granted a license for regular air transportation. In October 2008, bases were established at Gimpo airport and Jeju international airport and the airline commenced operations between Busan and Gimpo.

In April 2009, the airline took delivery of its fifth Boeing 737-400 aircraft. By August that year, Air Busan had marked 10,000 flights in the 299 days since it began operations. In September 2009, the number of passengers carried reached 1 million. International services, between Busan and Fukuoka, began in March 2010 and in April the number of passengers carried reached 2 million. In January 2011 Air Busan took delivery of its first Airbus A321-200 aircraft.

In 2018, Air Busan applied for a preliminary screening for an initial public offering.

In 2021, Korean Air's Post-Merger Instruction plan for Asiana Airlines was approved by the Korea Development Bank. It includes provisions to merge Air Busan with Korean Air's low cost carrier subsidiary, Jin Air.

Air Busan exclusively uses the expanded international terminal at Gimhae International Airport, which is operational from 26 March 2024.

As a result of Asiana Airlines merger with Korean Air, the airline, alongside Air Seoul will be integrated into Jin Air, Korean Air's subsidiary. In this result, in August 2026, along with Air Seoul signs of official agreement of integration with Jin Air, subsidiary of Korean Air. Since the signing, Air Busan is integrated with Jin Air by 17 March 2027.

== Destinations ==
Air Busan started operations in October 2008, using Gimhae International Airport as a base.

As of May 2025, Air Busan flies (or has flown) to the following destinations:

Country	City	Airport	Notes	Refs
Cambodia	Siem Reap	Siem Reap International Airport	Airport Closed	
China	Changsha	Changsha Huanghua International Airport ^{Charter}	Terminated	
China	Chengdu	Chengdu Shuangliu International Airport	Terminated	
China	Guangzhou	Guangzhou Baiyun International Airport	Begins 2 December 2026	
China	Haikou	Haikou Meilan International Airport		
China	Hohhot	Hohhot Baita International Airport ^{Charter}	Terminated	
China	Huangshan	Huangshan Tunxi International Airport ^{Charter}	Terminated	
China	Kunming	Kunming Changshui International Airport ^{Charter}	Terminated	
China	Ningbo	Ningbo Lishe International Airport		
China	Qingdao	Qingdao Jiaodong International Airport		
China	Qingdao	Qingdao Liuting International Airport	Airport Closed	
China	Sanya	Sanya Phoenix International Airport		
China	Shenzhen	Shenzhen Bao'an International Airport		
China	Shijiazhuang	Shijiazhuang Zhengding International Airport	Terminated	
China	Taiyuan	Taiyuan Wusu International Airport ^{Charter}	Terminated	
China	Xi'an	Xi'an Xianyang International Airport		
China	Yanji	Yanji Chaoyangchuan International Airport		
China	Zhangjiajie	Zhangjiajie Hehua International Airport		
China	Zhengzhou	Zhengzhou Xinzheng International Airport ^{Charter}	Terminated	
Guam	Hagåtña	Antonio B. Won Pat International Airport		
Hong Kong	Hong Kong	Hong Kong International Airport		
Indonesia	Denpasar	Ngurah Rai International Airport		
Japan	Fukuoka	Fukuoka Airport		
Japan	Kagoshima	Kagoshima Airport ^{Charter}	Terminated	
Japan	Kitakyushu	Kitakyushu Airport		
Japan	Matsuyama	Matsuyama Airport		
Japan	Nagoya	Chubu Centrair International Airport	Terminated	
Japan	Osaka	Kansai International Airport		
Japan	Sapporo	New Chitose Airport		
Japan	Tokyo	Haneda Airport ^{Charter}	Terminated	
Japan	Tokyo	Narita International Airport		
Japan	Toyama	Toyama Airport ^{Charter}	Terminated	
Laos	Vientiane	Wattay International Airport		
Macau	Macau	Macau International Airport		
Malaysia	Kota Kinabalu	Kota Kinabalu International Airport		
Mongolia	Ulaanbaatar	Buyant-Ukhaa International Airport	Airport Closed	
Mongolia	Ulaanbaatar	Chinggis Khaan International Airport		
Northern Mariana Islands	Saipan	Saipan International Airport		
Philippines	Cebu	Mactan–Cebu International Airport		
Philippines	Clark	Clark International Airport	Terminated	
Philippines	Kalibo	Kalibo International Airport	Terminated	
Philippines	Manila	Ninoy Aquino International Airport	Terminated	
Philippines	Tagbilaran	Bohol–Panglao International Airport	Terminated	
Russia	Vladivostok	Vladivostok International Airport	Terminated	
Singapore	Singapore	Changi Airport ^{Charter}	Terminated	
South Korea	Busan	Gimhae International Airport	Hub	
South Korea	Daegu	Daegu International Airport	Terminated	
South Korea	Jeju	Jeju International Airport		
South Korea	Seoul	Gimpo International Airport		
South Korea	Seoul	Incheon International Airport		
South Korea	Ulsan	Ulsan Airport		
Taiwan	Kaohsiung	Kaohsiung International Airport		
Taiwan	Taipei	Taoyuan International Airport		
Thailand	Bangkok	Suvarnabhumi Airport		
Thailand	Chiang Mai	Chiang Mai International Airport		
Vietnam	Da Nang	Da Nang International Airport		
Vietnam	Hanoi	Noi Bai International Airport		
Vietnam	Ho Chi Minh City	Tan Son Nhat International Airport		
Vietnam	Nha Trang	Cam Ranh International Airport		

=== Codeshare agreements ===
Air Busan has codeshares with the following airlines (as of May 2014):

- All Nippon Airways
- Asiana Airlines
- Jin Air

== Fleet ==
=== Current fleet ===
As of July 2026, Air Busan operates the following aircraft:

Air Busan fleet
Aircraft	In service	Orders	Passenger	Notes
Airbus A320-200	5	—	180	
Airbus A321-200	8	—	195	
Airbus A321-200	8	—	220	
Airbus A321neo	5	—	232	
Airbus A321LR	3	—	220	
Total	21	—		

=== Former fleet ===
As of August 2025, Air Busan operated 5 Airbus A320, 7 Airbus A321 and 8 Airbus A321neo.

Air Busan also previously operated the following aircraft types:

Air Busan retired fleet
Aircraft	Total	Year introduced	Year retired	Notes
Airbus A320-200	3	2016	2024	
Airbus A321-200	11	2011	2024	
Airbus A321-200	1	2017	2025	Written-off as flight BX391
Boeing 737-400	4	2009	2016	Former Asiana Airlines fleet.
Boeing 737-500	3	2008	2016	Former Asiana Airlines fleet.

== Accidents and incidents ==
- On 28 January 2025, Air Busan Flight 391, an Airbus A321-200 registered as HL7763, caught fire before takeoff at Gimhae International Airport, South Korea, bound for Hong Kong, resulting in seven injuries and the evacuation of all 176 people on board, also being the airline's first hull loss.

== See also ==
- List of low-cost airlines in South Korea
- Air Seoul
- Eastar Jet
- Jeju Air
- Jin Air – low cost subsidiary of Korean Air
- T'way Air
