= Kumamoto Airport =

International airport serving Kumamoto Japan

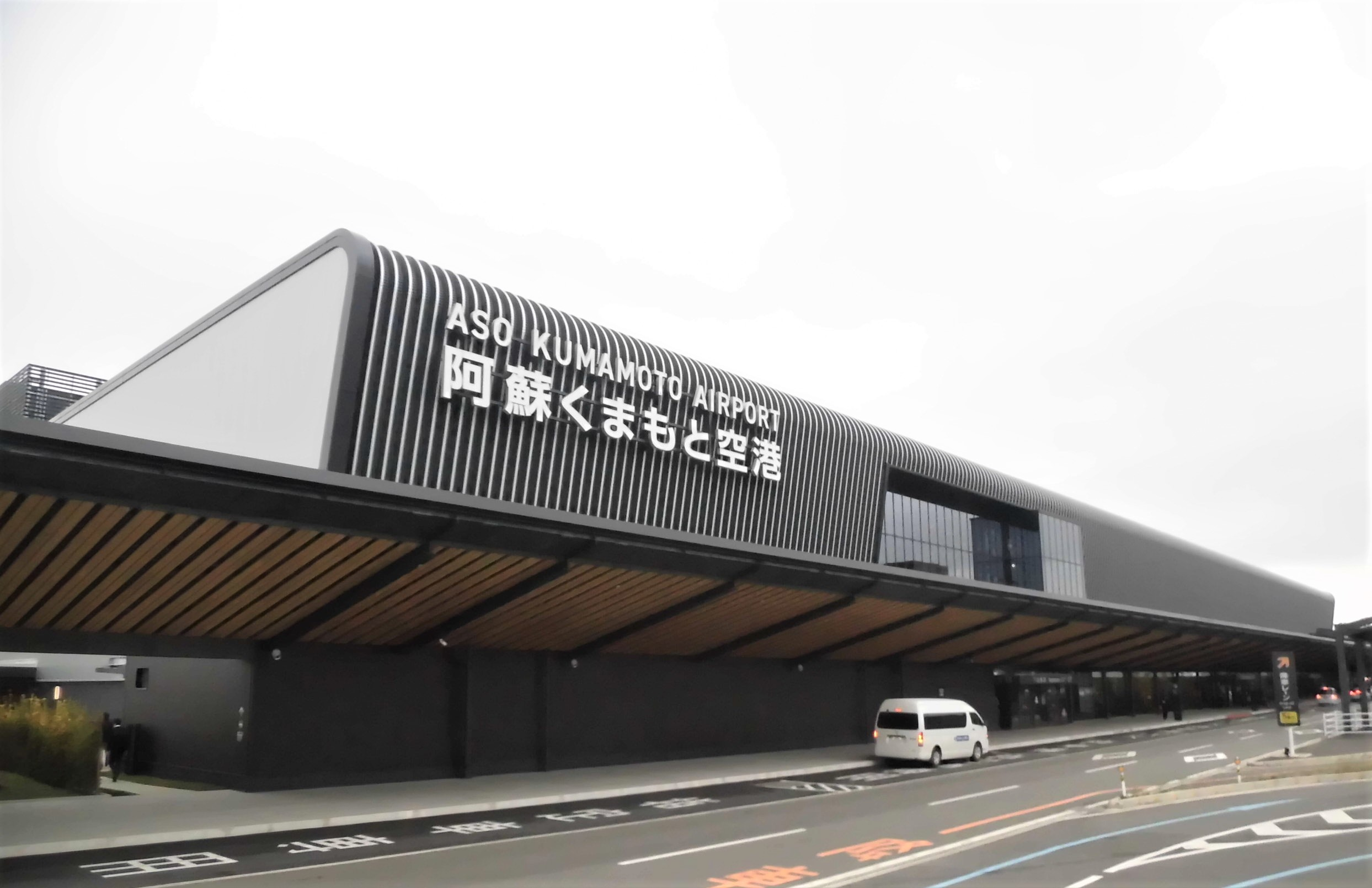
- IATA: KMJ; ICAO: RJFT

Summary
- Airport type: Public
- Serves: Kumamoto
- Location: Mashiki, Kumamoto Prefecture
- Opened: 1971; 55 years ago
- Elevation AMSL: 632 ft (193 m)
- Coordinates: 32°50′14″N 130°51′19″E
- Website: www.kumamoto-airport.co.jp/en

Map
- Location in Kumamoto Prefecture Location in Japan

Runways
Direction	Length		Surface
Direction	m	ft	Surface
07/25	3,000	9,843	Asphalt concrete

Statistics (2015)
- Passengers: 3,241,633
- Cargo (metric tonnes): 16,538
- Aircraft movement: 41,924
- Source: Japanese Ministry of Land, Infrastructure, Transport and Tourism

Kumamoto Airport (熊本空港, Kumamoto Kūkō) (IATA: KMJ, ICAO: RJFT), also known as Aso Kumamoto Airport (阿蘇くまもと空港, Aso Kumamoto Kūkō), is an international airport in Mashiki, Kumamoto Prefecture, Japan.

== History ==
The first Kumamoto Airport opened in 1960 on the site of a former Imperial Japanese Army air base and had a 1,200 m runway. It was replaced by the current Kumamoto Airport in 1971. The new airport originally had a 2,500 m runway which allowed jet aircraft to operate there, unlike the previous airport. The runway was later extended to 3,000 m in 1980.

Kumamoto was one of three nationally owned airports to turn a profit in fiscal year 2011 (along with New Chitose Airport and Komatsu Airport). In 2013, the government passed legislation aimed at eventually allowing the sale of an operating concession at the airport.

China Airlines charter service to Kaohsiung was announced in 2014 in order to cater to package tours from Taiwan.

In March 2018, the Ministry of Land, Infrastructure, Transport and Tourism decided to outsource the operation to a private company from April 2020 in order to accelerate the recovery from the Kumamoto earthquakes and to promote utilization and improve services by making use of private sector know-how. The operator is Kumamoto International Airport Co., Ltd., which is funded by a consortium of 11 companies led by Mitsui Fudosan.

Following the 2016 Kumamoto earthquakes, which severely damaged the airport, Kumamoto International Airport Co., Ltd. began developing a new terminal building which was planned to withstand strong earthquakes. It was also made to integrates both domestic and international flights. The new terminal building officially opened on 23 March 2023.

== Airlines and destinations ==
Airlines	Destinations
Aero K	Cheongju (begins 23 December 2026)
All Nippon Airways	Osaka–Itami, Tokyo–Haneda
Amakusa Airlines	Amakusa, Osaka–Itami
ANA Wings	Naha, Osaka–Itami
China Airlines	Kaohsiung, Taipei–Taoyuan
Eastar Jet	Busan
Fuji Dream Airlines	Nagoya–Komaki
Ibex Airlines	Nagoya–Centrair
J-Air	Osaka–Itami
Japan Airlines	Tokyo–Haneda
Jetstar Japan	Osaka–Kansai, Tokyo–Narita
Korean Air	Seoul–Incheon
Solaseed Air	Tokyo–Haneda
Starlux Airlines	Taichung, Taipei–Taoyuan
Tigerair Taiwan	Kaohsiung, Tainan
Trinity Airways	Seoul–Incheon
