= Eastar Jet =

Low-cost airline of South Korea

EASTAR JET Co., Ltd. 이스타항공 주식회사

- Eastar Jet Boeing 737 MAX
IATA	ICAO	Call sign
ZE	ESR	EASTAR
- Founded: 26 October 2007; 19 years ago
- Commenced operations: 7 January 2009; 17 years ago
- Operating bases: Busan; Cheongju; Jeju; Seoul–Gimpo; Seoul–Incheon
- Fleet size: 17
- Destinations: 19
- Parent company: Eastar Jet Group (2007–2021); Sung Jung Co., Ltd (2021–2022); VIG Partners (2023–present)
- Headquarters: Gangseo-gu, Seoul
- Key people: Joong-Seok Cho (President)
- Website: www.eastarjet.com

- Eastar Jet
- Hangul: 이스타항공
- Hanja: 이스타航空
- Revised Romanization: Iseuta Hanggong
- McCune–Reischauer: Isŭt'a Hanggong

Eastar Jet (ESR; Korean: 이스타항공) is a South Korean low-cost carrier with its headquarters in Gangseo-gu, Seoul.

== History ==
Eastar Jet was established on October 26, 2007, and its air operator's certificate was acquired the following year on August 6. On January 7, 2009, Eastar Jet launched its first commercial flight from Seoul to Jeju with a Boeing 737. It commenced operations on its second route - Cheongju-Jeju - on June 12, 2009. Six months later, on December 24, 2009, Eastar Jet launched its first international flight from Incheon to Kuching, Malaysia. Within two years of commencing operations, the airline reached the 1 million mark in passengers carried on January 6, 2010.

The airline joined the U-FLY Alliance on July 27, 2016; it is the fifth member of the alliance.

On 2 March 2020, Jeju Air, one of the South Korean low-cost carriers, decided to take over the management rights of Eastar Jet and signed a stock trading contract. Jeju Air agreed to acquire a 51.17% stake in Eastar Jet cost of 54.5 billion won, and the plan got approval from the Fair Trade Commission of the Republic of Korea. However, on 23 July 2020, Jeju Air announced that it was to give up the acquisition of Eastar Jet due to economic uncertainty caused by the COVID-19 pandemic.

In August 2020, Eastar Jet pushed forward to re-mergers and acquisitions and selected three companies. Eastar Jet also began restructuring, the plan included reduction of its fleet of 16 aircraft to four and reduce the labor force from 1,200 to 400; however, Jeju Air would rehire all of its dismissed employees.

On June 17, 2021, it was announced that Eastar Jet was set to be acquired for more than US$97 million by property developer and preferred bidder Sung Jung, following an auction of the airline. However, Sung Jung sold the entire stake of Eastar Jet to VIG Partners, a private equity fund company, in January 2023.

Eastar Jet resumed operations in 2023 with three aircraft, supported by an investment from private equity firm VIG Partners. By the end of 2023, the airline had expanded its fleet to 10 aircraft.

During 2024, the fleet was expanded to 15 aircraft with the addition of four Boeing 737-800s and one Boeing 737 MAX 8. An additional 12 Boeing 737 MAX 8s were purchased. This time, the contract is for new planes rather than used ones, and the airline plans to take delivery of seven in 2025 and five in 2026, increasing the fleet to 27 aircraft by 2026.

According to AirPortal, an aviation information system of the Ministry of Land, Infrastructure and Transport, the number of domestic passengers of Eastar Jet between January and October 2024 was 2.2 million and 1.48 million international flights, recovering to about 72% from 2019 (2.59 million domestic and 2.5 million international).

== Destinations ==
As of September 2026, Eastar Jet flies (or has flown) to the following destinations:

Country	City	Airport	Notes	Refs
Cambodia	Siem Reap	Siem Reap International Airport	Airport Closed	
China	Dalian	Dalian Zhoushuizi International Airport	Terminated	
China	Haikou	Haikou Meilan International Airport	Terminated	
China	Hangzhou	Hangzhou Xiaoshan International Airport	Begins 3 December 2026	
China	Harbin	Harbin Taiping International Airport	Terminated	
China	Hohhot	Hohhot Baita International Airport		
China	Jinan	Jinan Yaoqiang International Airport	Terminated	
China	Ningbo	Ningbo Lishe International Airport	Terminated	
China	Shanghai	Shanghai Pudong International Airport		
China	Shenyang	Shenyang Taoxian International Airport	Terminated	
China	Xiamen	Xiamen Gaoqi International Airport		
China	Yanji	Yanji Chaoyangchuan International Airport	Terminated	
China	Yantai	Yantai Penglai International Airport		
China	Zhangjiajie	Zhangjiajie Hehua International Airport		
China	Zhengzhou	Zhengzhou Xinzheng International Airport		
Hong Kong	Hong Kong	Hong Kong International Airport		
Indonesia	Manado	Sam Ratulangi International Airport		
Japan	Fukuoka	Fukuoka Airport		
Japan	Ibaraki	Ibaraki Airport	Terminated	
Japan	Kagoshima	Kagoshima Airport		
Japan	Kumamoto	Kumamoto Airport		
Japan	Miyazaki	Miyazaki Airport	Terminated	
Japan	Naha	Naha Airport		
Japan	Osaka	Kansai International Airport		
Japan	Sapporo	New Chitose Airport		
Japan	Tokushima	Tokushima Airport		
Japan	Tokyo	Haneda Airport	Terminated	
Japan	Tokyo	Narita International Airport		
Kazakhstan	Almaty	Almaty International Airport		
Macau	Macau	Macau International Airport	Terminated	
Malaysia	Kota Kinabalu	Kota Kinabalu International Airport	Terminated	
Northern Mariana Islands	Saipan	Saipan International Airport	Terminated	
Philippines	Puerto Princesa	Puerto Princesa International Airport	Terminated	
Russia	Vladivostok	Vladivostok International Airport ^{Seasonal}	Terminated	
Singapore	Singapore	Changi Airport ^{Unscheduled}	Terminated	
South Korea	Busan	Gimhae International Airport	Base	
South Korea	Cheongju	Cheongju International Airport	Base	
South Korea	Gunsan	Gunsan Airport	Terminated	
South Korea	Jeju	Jeju International Airport	Base	
South Korea	Seoul	Gimpo International Airport	Base	
South Korea	Seoul	Incheon International Airport	Base	
Taiwan	Hualien	Hualien Airport	Terminated	
Taiwan	Kaohsiung	Kaohsiung International Airport	Terminated	
Taiwan	Taipei	Songshan Airport		
Taiwan	Taipei	Taoyuan International Airport		
Thailand	Bangkok	Suvarnabhumi Airport		
Thailand	Chiang Mai	Chiang Mai International Airport		
Vietnam	Da Nang	Da Nang International Airport		
Vietnam	Hanoi	Noi Bai International Airport	Terminated	
Vietnam	Nha Trang	Cam Ranh International Airport		
Vietnam	Phu Quoc	Phu Quoc International Airport		

=== Codeshare agreements ===
Eastar Jet codeshares with the following airlines:

- Spring Airlines
- Trinity Airways

== Fleet ==
=== Current fleet ===
As of December 2025, Eastar Jet operates an all-Boeing 737 fleet composed of the following aircraft:

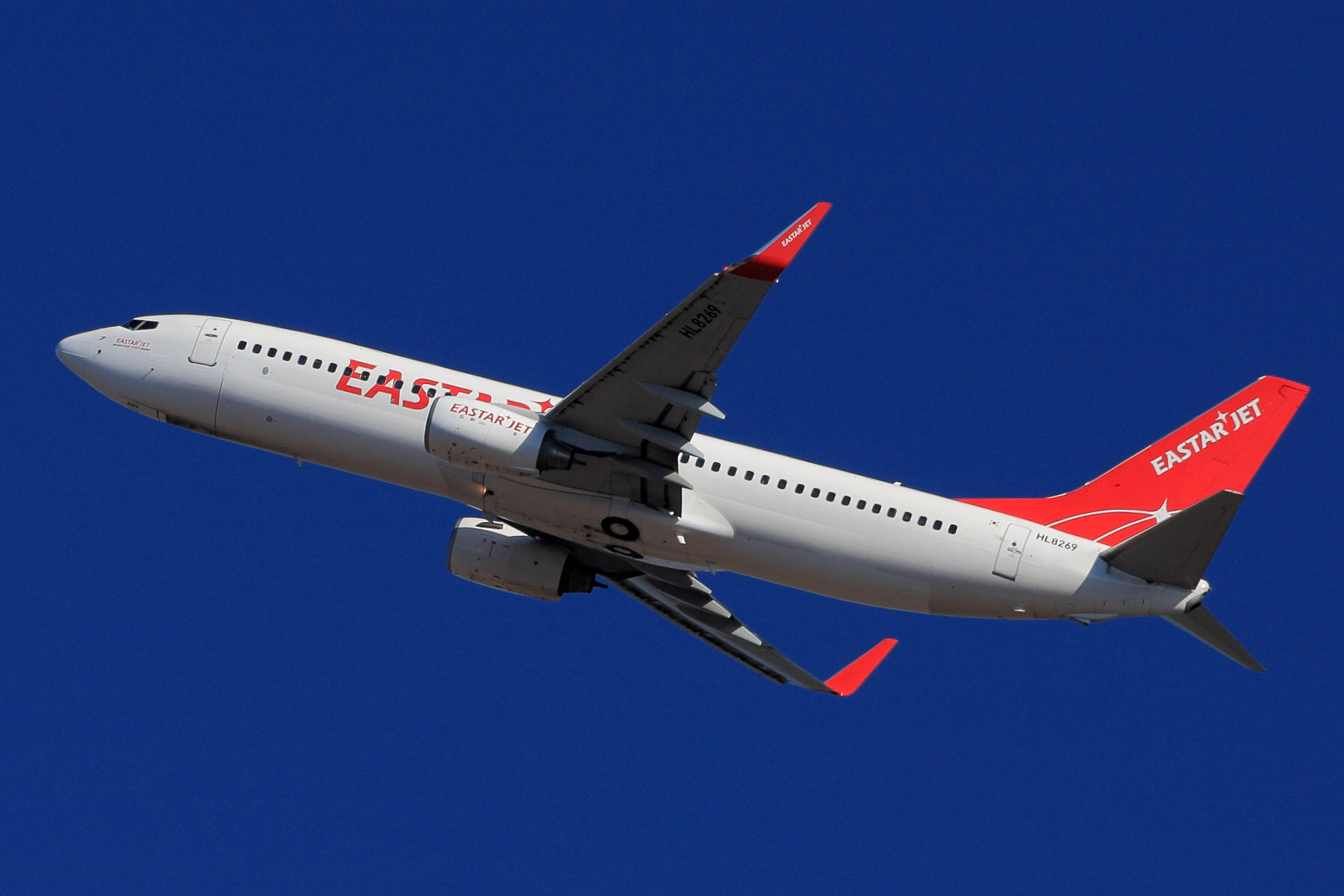
Boeing 737-800

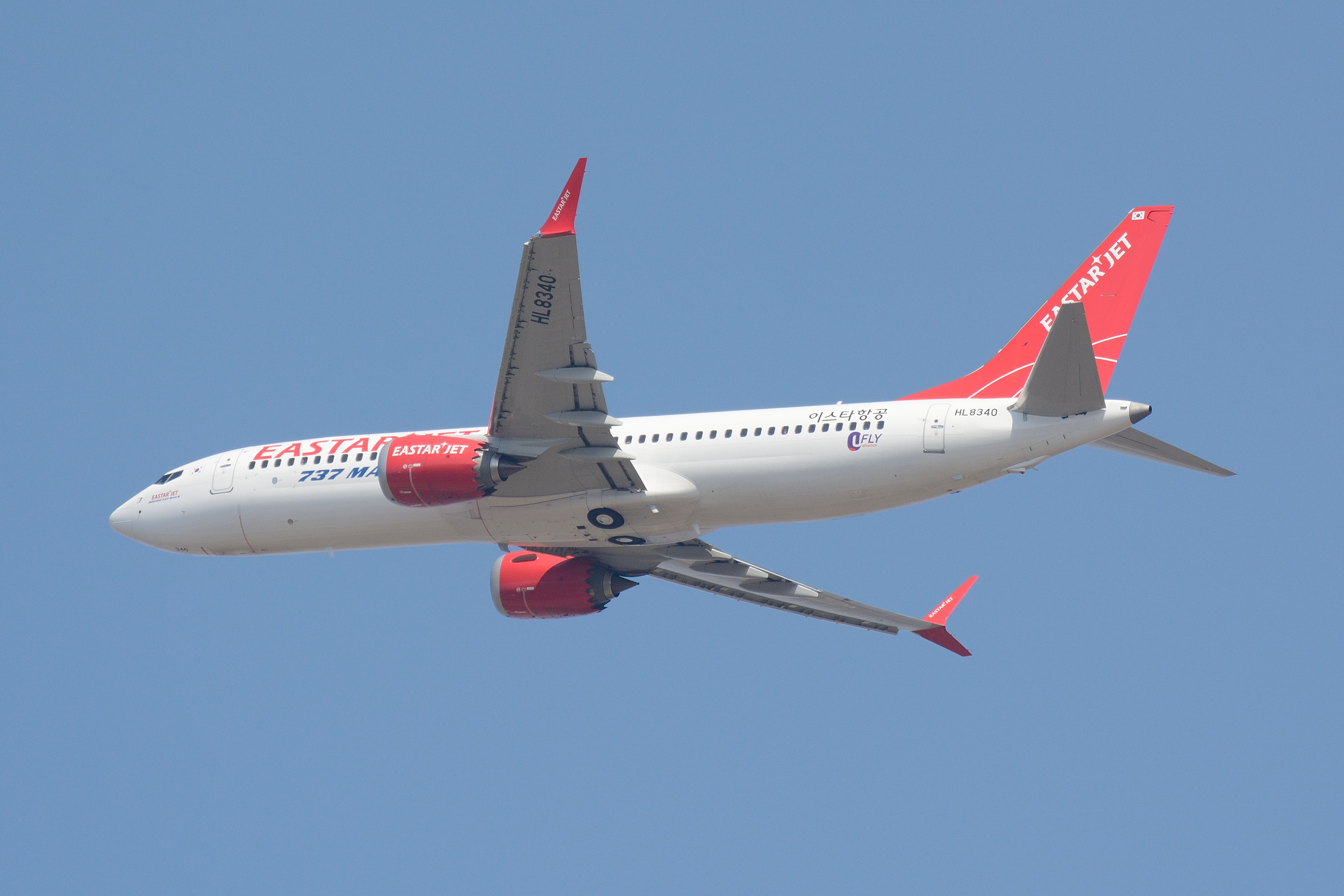
Boeing 737 MAX 8

Eastar Jet fleet
Aircraft	In service	Orders	Passengers	Notes
Boeing 737-800	10	—	186	
Boeing 737-800	10	—	189	
Boeing 737 MAX 8	14	2	189	Redeliveries from June 2023.
Total	24	2		

Easter Jet is planning adding Boeing 787 Dreamliners as per 2027

=== Retired fleet ===
Eastar Jet has previously operated the following aircraft types:

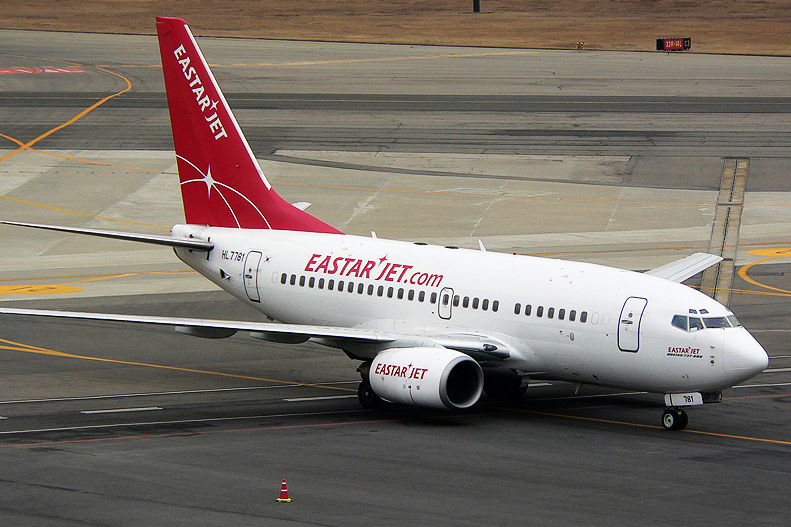
Boeing 737-600

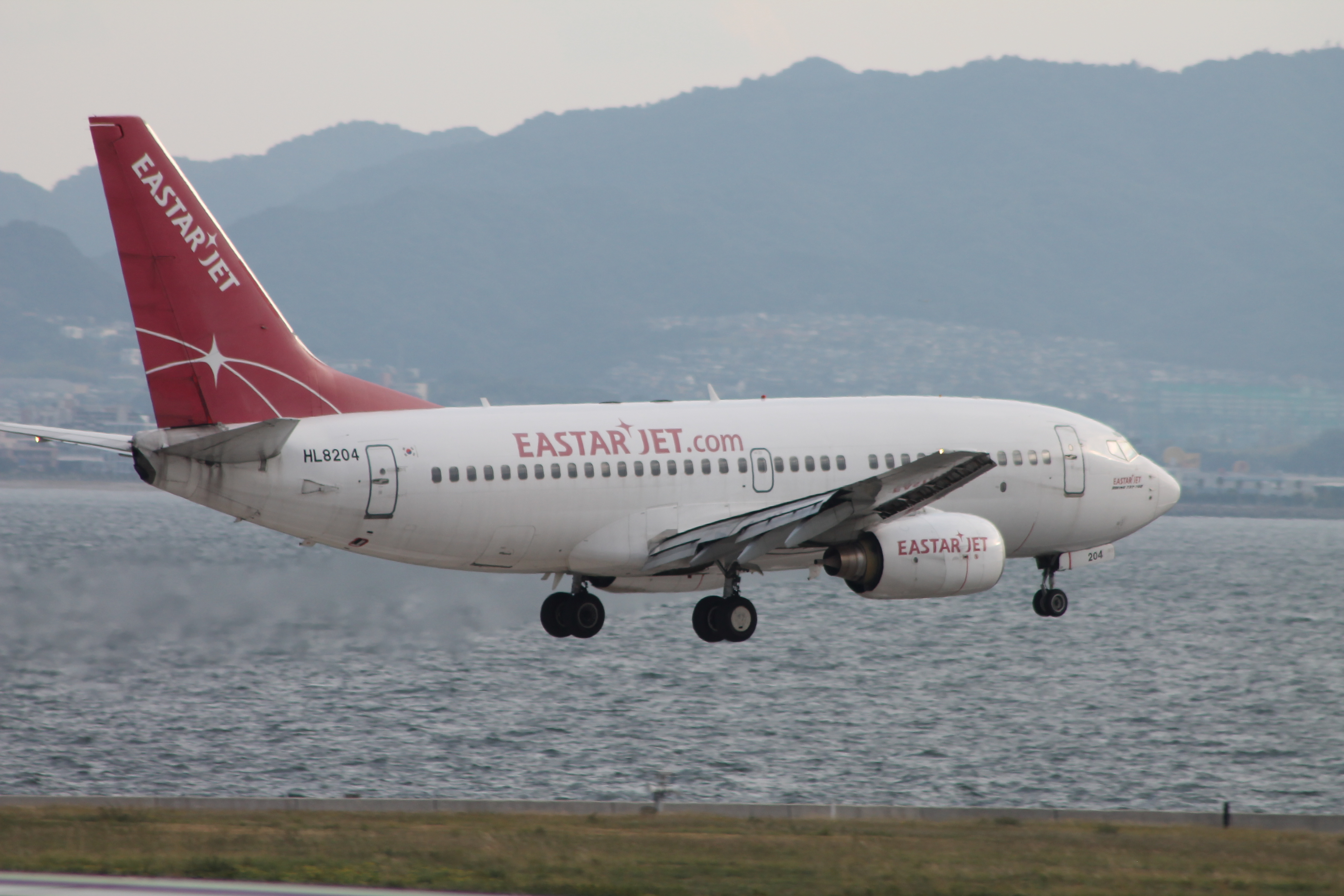
Boeing 737-700

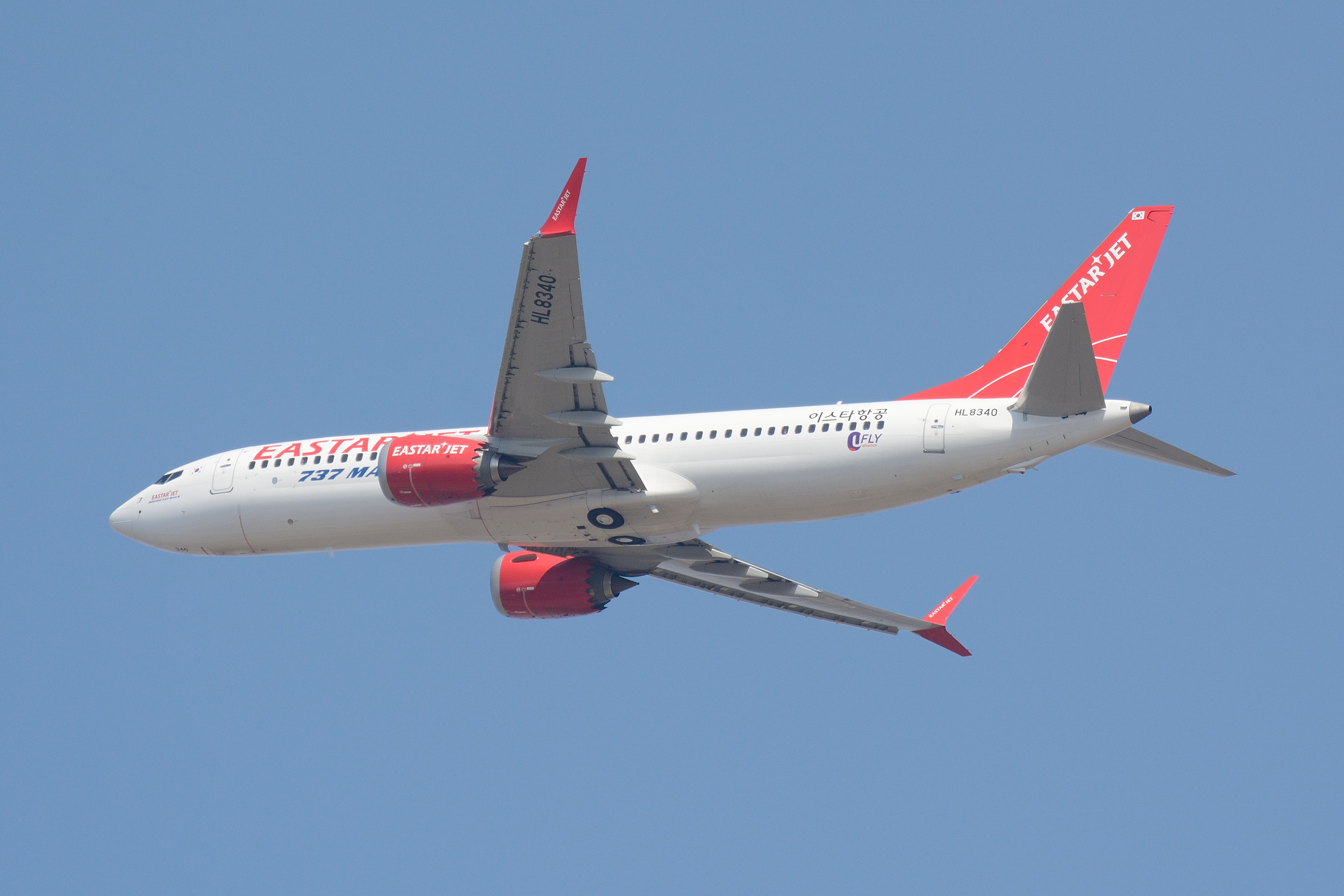
Boeing 737 MAX 8

Eastar Jet retired fleet
Aircraft	Total	Introduced	Retired	Notes
Boeing 737-600	1	2008	2013	
Boeing 737-700	6	2009	2018	
Boeing 737-800	20	2012	2020	
Boeing 737-900ER	2	2017	2020	

== See also ==
- List of low-cost airlines in South Korea
- Air Busan
- Jeju Air
- Jin Air
