= Aero K =

Low-cost airline of South Korea

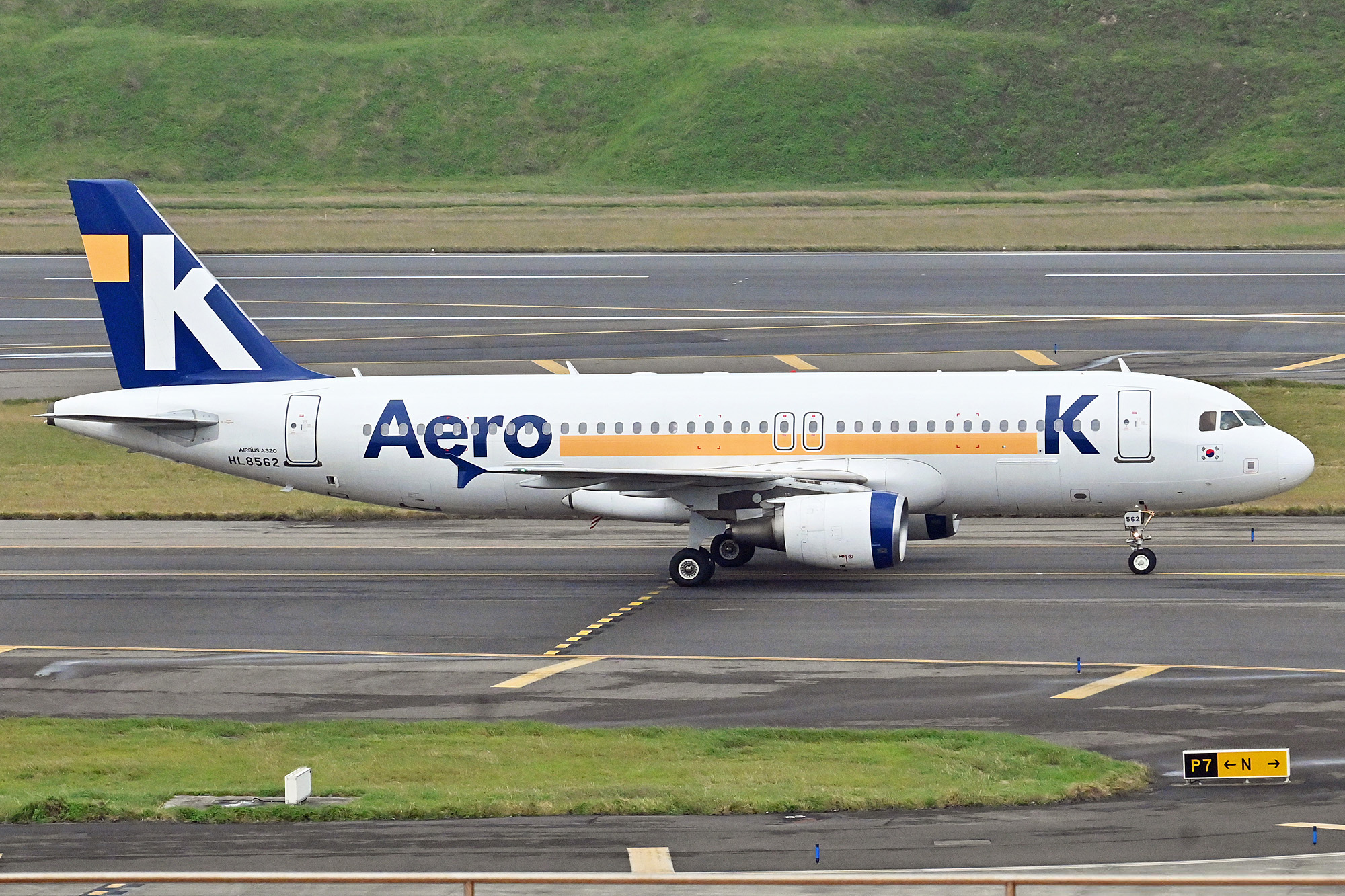
- Aero-K A320-214
IATA	ICAO	Call sign
RF	EOK	AEROHANGUK
- Founded: 18 May 2016; 10 years ago
- Commenced operations: 15 April 2021; 5 years ago
- Operating bases: Cheongju International Airport
- Fleet size: 9
- Destinations: 8
- Parent company: Aero K Holdings Co., Ltd. (Daemyung Chemical)
- Headquarters: Osong-eup (오송읍), Heungdeok-gu, Cheongju, Chungcheongbuk-do, South Korea
- Key people: Kang Byeong-ho (CEO)
- Website: www.aerok.com/kr

Aero K Airlines Co., Ltd. (Korean: 에어로케이; RR: eeolo kei) is a low-cost airline based in South Korea. It was founded on 18 May 2016 and received its first aircraft in 2020. The name is derived from spelling "Korea" backwards.

Its headquarters are in Osong-eup (오송읍), Heungdeok-gu, Cheongju.

== History ==
Aero K was founded on 18 May 2016 originally named as K-AIR Aviation. They obtained their Air Operator's Certificate (AOC) on 28 December 2020. The company received their first Airbus A320, registered as HL8384, on 14 February 2020.

Aero K aims to start flights to destinations within Asia to Japan, Philippines, Taiwan, and Vietnam. Their inaugural flight was a domestic flight within South Korea to Jeju International Airport from their hub in Cheongju.

== Destinations ==
As of September 2026, Aero K flies (or has flown) to the following destinations:

Aero K Destinations
Country	City	Airport	Notes	Refs
China	Datong	Datong Yungang International Airport		
China	Jinan	Jinan Yaoqiang International Airport		
China	Qionghai	Qionghai Bo'ao International Airport ^{Charter}	Terminated	
China	Qingdao	Qingdao Jiaodong International Airport		
Japan	Fukuoka	Fukuoka Airport		
Japan	Hiroshima	Hiroshima Airport		
Japan	Ibaraki	Ibaraki Airport		
Japan	Kitakyushu	Kitakyushu Airport		
Japan	Kobe	Kobe Airport ^{Charter}	Seasonal	
Japan	Nagoya	Chubu Centrair International Airport		
Japan	Naha	Naha Airport		
Japan	Obihiro	Tokachi–Obihiro Airport	Seasonal	
Japan	Osaka	Kansai International Airport		
Japan	Sapporo	New Chitose Airport		
Japan	Tokyo	Narita International Airport		
Laos	Pakse	Pakse International Airport ^{Charter}	Terminated	
Mongolia	Ulaanbaatar	Chinggis Khaan International Airport		
Philippines	Cebu	Mactan–Cebu International Airport	Terminated	
Philippines	Clark	Clark International Airport	Seasonal	
Philippines	Manila	Ninoy Aquino International Airport	Terminated	
South Korea	Cheongju	Cheongju International Airport	Base	
South Korea	Jeju	Jeju International Airport		
South Korea	Seoul	Incheon International Airport	Terminated	
South Korea	Yangyang	Yangyang International Airport	Terminated	
Taiwan	Hualien	Hualien Airport	Terminated	
Taiwan	Kaohsiung	Kaohsiung International Airport		
Taiwan	Penghu	Penghu Airport	Terminated	
Taiwan	Taipei	Taoyuan International Airport		
Vietnam	Da Nang	Da Nang International Airport		
Vietnam	Hanoi	Noi Bai International Airport		
Vietnam	Nha Trang	Cam Ranh International Airport		

== Fleet ==
=== Current fleet ===
As of July 2026, Aero K operates the following aircraft:

Aero K fleet
Aircraft	In service	Orders	Passengers	Notes
Airbus A320	9	—	180	
Total	9	—		

=== Former fleet ===
As of August 2025, Aero K operated 9 Airbus A320.

Aero K has also previously operated the following aircraft:

Aero K retired fleet
Aircraft	Total	Introduced	Retired	Notes
Airbus A320-200	1	2020	2024	

== See also ==
- List of airlines of South Korea
- Low-cost carrier
