= Cheongju International Airport =

Airport in North Chungcheong, South Korea

Cheongju International Airport 청주국제공항
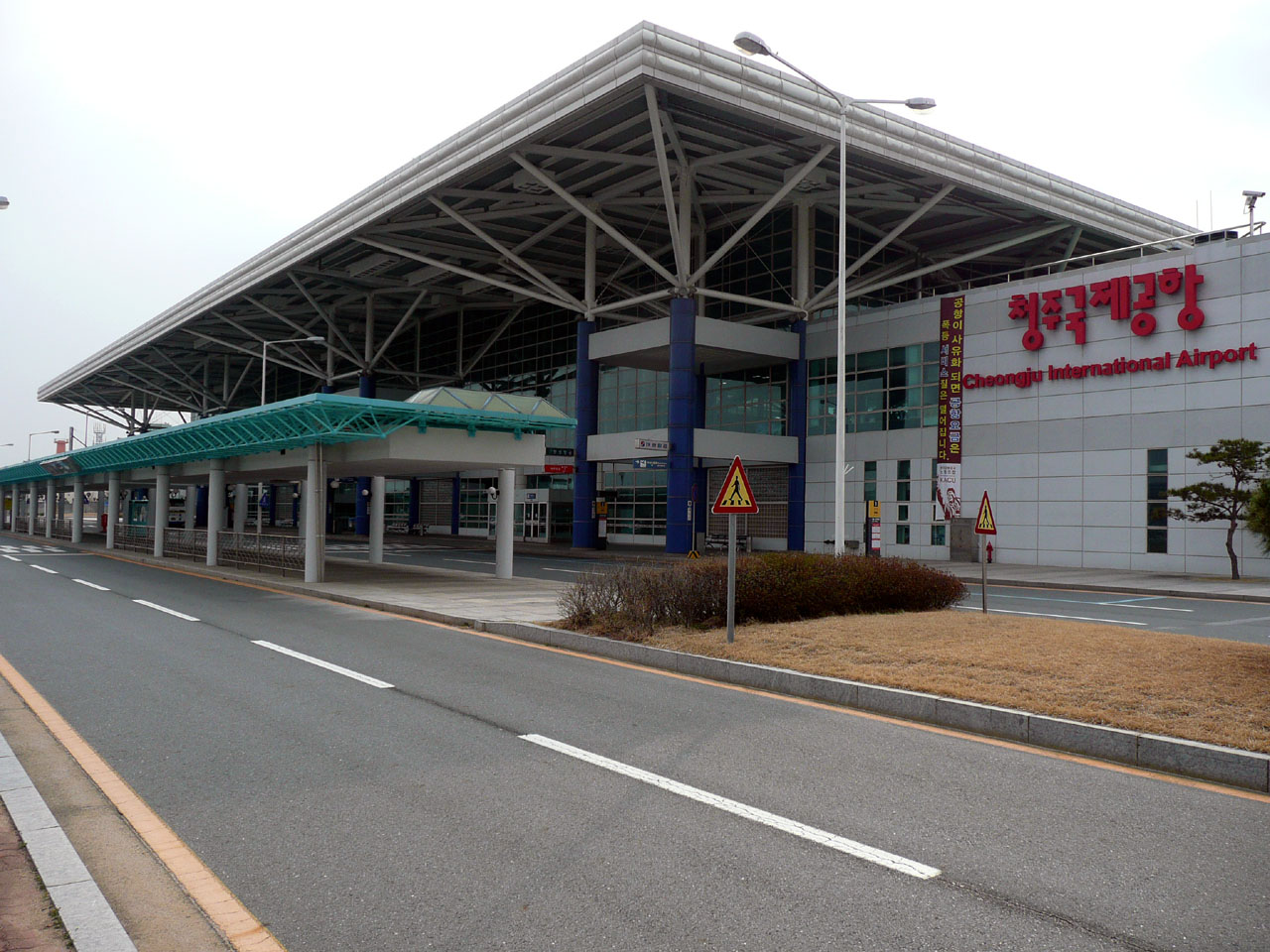
- IATA: CJJ; ICAO: RKTU

Summary
- Airport type: Public / Military
- Owner: Ministry of Land, Infrastructure and Transport
- Operator: Korea Airports Corporation; Republic of Korea Air Force
- Serves: Daejeon, Sejong City, North Chungcheong
- Location: Cheongwon-gu, Cheongju, North Chungcheong Province, South Korea
- Opened: 28 April 1997; 29 years ago
- Operating base for: Aero K; Eastar Jet; T'way Air
- Built: September 1978; 48 years ago
- Elevation AMSL: 191 ft (58 m)
- Coordinates: 36°42′59″N 127°29′57″E
- Website: www.airport.co.kr/cheongju/

Map
- Location of airport in South Korea

Runways
Direction	Length		Surface
Direction	m	ft	Surface
06R/24L	2,743	9,000	Concrete
06L/24R	2,743	9,000	Concrete

Statistics (2024)
- Passengers: 4,579,221
- Aircraft movements: 18,648
- Tonnes of cargo: 18,918
- Statistics from KAC

- Cheongju International Airport
- Hangul: 청주국제공항
- Hanja: 淸州國際空港
- RR: Cheongju gukjegonghang
- MR: Ch'ŏngju kukchegonghang

Cheongju International Airport (IATA: CJJ, ICAO: RKTU) is an international airport in Cheongwon-gu, Cheongju, South Korea. It also serves the cities of Daejeon and Sejong. In 2024, 4,579,221 passengers used the airport. It also houses the 17th fighter wing of the ROKAF (F-35A fighters). There is the Cheongju Int'l Airport railway station next to the airport, called Cheongju Airport station, which is on the Chungbuk Line.

== Overview ==
Cheongju International Airport is located at Ipsang-ri (a township), Naesu-eup (읍; town), Cheongwon-gu, Cheongju, Chungcheongbuk-do. A railway station is located nearby. It opened as a military airbase in September 1978, and in 1984, international airport construction began. The construction was completed in December 1996, and it was opened as Cheongju International Airport on April 28, 1997. During the mid 80's, Cheongju was selected as a possible site for Korea's main international airport before Incheon became the preferred location. It can process 1.23 million people from domestic flights and 1.15 million people from international flights annually, and the parking lots can hold 770 vehicles. In addition, airplanes can operate 196,000 times a year. There used to be flights to Busan and Saipan, but they were stopped due to low ridership. Currently, there are domestic flights to Jeju and international flights to China, Japan, Taiwan, and Thailand. Because Cheongju International Airport is a joint civil-military airport, photography and videography is strictly prohibited on the installation.

== Airlines and destinations ==
=== Passenger ===
Airlines	Destinations
Aero K	Da Nang, Datong, Hiroshima, Ibaraki, Jeju, Kitakyushu, Kumamoto (begins 23 December 2026), Matsuyama (begins 2 January 2027), Nagoya–Centrair, Naha, Osaka–Kansai, Penghu, Sapporo–Chitose, Taipei–Taoyuan, Tokyo–Narita, Ulaanbaatar; Seasonal: Clark, Obihiro; Seasonal charter: Kobe
Asiana Airlines	Jeju
Beijing Capital Airlines	Lijiang
Eastar Jet	Jeju, Shanghai–Pudong, Taipei–Taoyuan, Yanji, Zhangjiajie
Jeju Air	Jeju
Jin Air	Jeju
Korean Air	Jeju
Loong Air	Zhangjiajie
Qingdao Airlines	Qingdao
Ruili Airlines	Kunming
Sichuan Airlines	Zhangjiajie
Trinity Airways	Da Nang, Fukuoka, Jeju, Nha Trang, Osaka–Kansai, Taipei–Taoyuan, Ulaanbaatar, Yanji

=== Cargo ===
Airlines	Destinations
Korean Air Cargo	Seoul–Incheon; Seasonal: Shanghai–Pudong

== Statistics ==
Air traffic statistics
	Aircraft operations	Passenger volume	Cargo tonnage
2001	4,138	606,108	19,672
2002	4,478	634,066	19,378
2003	5,687	761,148	23,020
2004	6,622	821,259	21,295
2005	7,085	857,269	13,542
2006	8,868	999,563	13,814
2007	9,286	1,032,484	13,516
2008	9,925	1,042,512	12,001
2009	8,879	1,023,532	10,606
2010	9,185	1,296,842	12,501
2011	9,082	1,337,791	16,179
2012	9,159	1,308,994	16,424
2013	9,579	1,378,604	12,994
2014	11,633	1,702,538	17,759
2015	14,153	2,118,492	19,802
2016	17,418	2,732,755	22,263
2017	15,825	2,571,551	19,213
2018	15,683	2,453,649	17,986
2019	18,648	1,503,528	18,918
2020	13,625	1,970,863	10,378
2021	17,425	2,628,257	13,627
2022	18,516	3,174,649	16,776
2023	22,547	3,695,812	20,724
2024	28,387	4,579,221	28,204
Source: Korea Airports Corporation Traffic Statistics

== Ground transportation ==
=== Railway ===
There is a train station at Cheongju Airport but it is not on a main rail line, and the schedule is limited. KTX high speed train does not stop at Cheongju city but stops outside Cheongju at Osong Station.

=== Bus ===
In 2019, there are 13 express and conventional buses per day from Seoul's Central City Terminal and four buses from the COEX City Airport Terminal in southern Seoul.

=== Car ===
The parking facility is located directly opposite the passenger terminal.

== See also ==
- Transportation in South Korea
