= Zhangjiajie Hehua International Airport =

Airport serving Zhangjiajie, Hunan, China

Zhangjiajie Hehua International Airport 张家界荷花国际机场
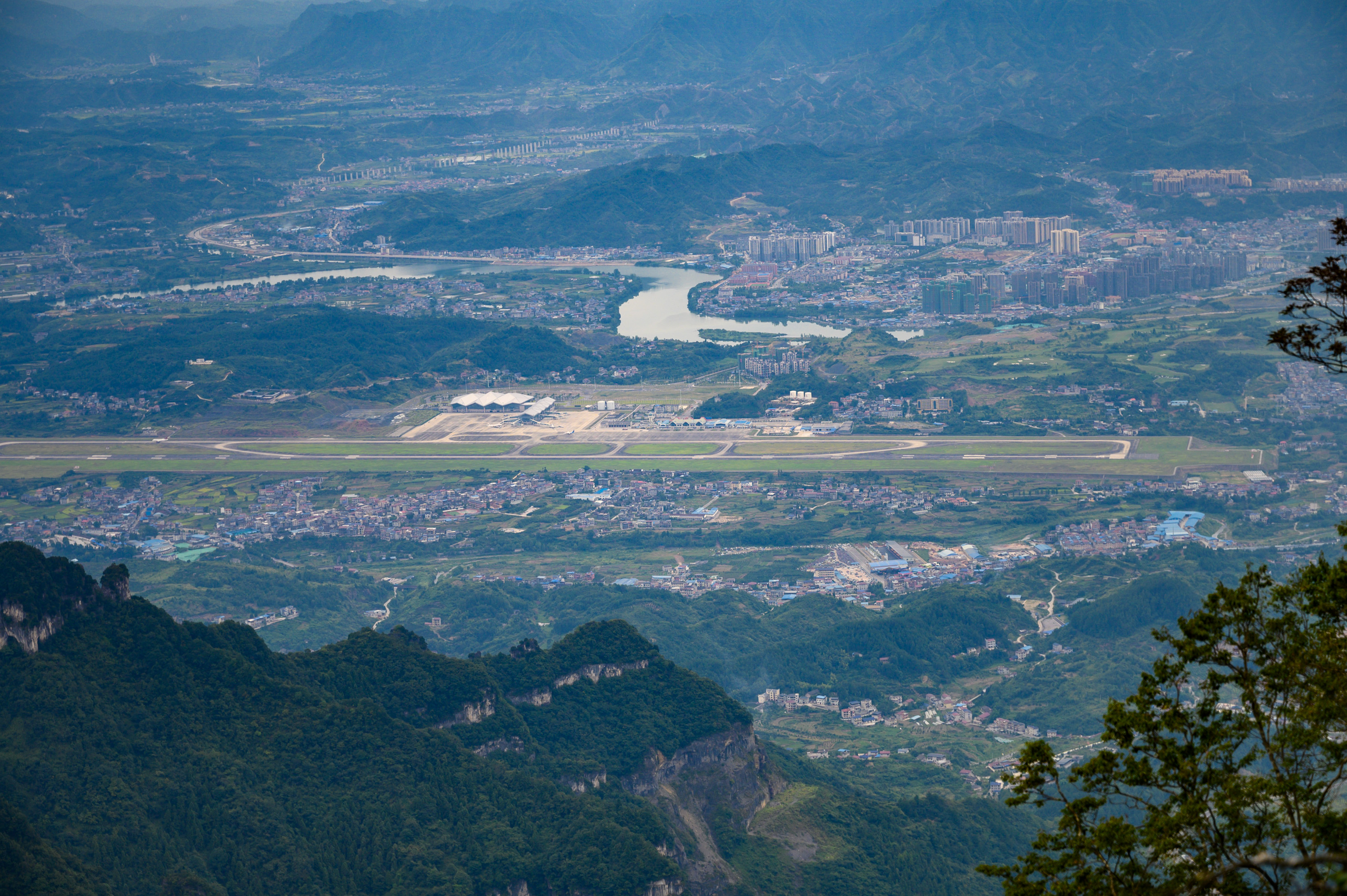
- IATA: DYG; ICAO: ZGDY

Summary
- Airport type: Public
- Serves: Zhangjiajie
- Location: Huhua, Yongding District, Zhangjiajie, Hunan, China
- Opened: 18 August 1994; 32 years ago
- Elevation AMSL: 217 m (712 ft)
- Coordinates: 29°06′11″N 110°26′36″E

Map
- Location in Hunan DYG/ZGDY (China)

Runways
Direction	Length		Surface
Direction	m	ft	Surface
08/26	2,600	8,530	Concrete

Statistics (2025)
- Passengers: 2,062,663
- Aircraft movements: 15,578
- Cargo (metric tons): 176.5
- Source: CAAC

Zhangjiajie Hehua International Airport
- Simplified Chinese: 张家界荷花国际机场
- Traditional Chinese: 張家界荷花國際機場
Transcriptions
Standard Mandarin
- Hanyu Pinyin: Zhāngjiājiè Héhuā Guójì Jīchǎng

Zhangjiajie Hehua International Airport (IATA: DYG, ICAO: ZGDY) is an international airport serving the city of Zhangjiajie in South Central China's Hunan province. It is located in Huhua village in Yongding District of Zhangjiajie. It is the second largest airport in Hunan, after Changsha Huanghua International Airport, and the only international airport in the Wuling Mountains region. As of 2019 it has a capacity of 5 million passengers, 19,000 tons of cargo and 45,000 aircraft movements.This airport is rated 4-star regional airport for facilities, comfort, cleanliness, shopping, foods, staff service by Skytrax.

== History ==
In 1991, construction started on Dayong Airport, which had its first test flight in December 1993 (Dayong is the former name of Zhangjiajie City).

The airport eventually opened for commercial flights under the name Dayong Zhangjiajie Airport on 18 August 1994. In 1995 it was renamed Zhangjiajie Hehua Airport. In 1999 it served 500,000 passengers annually.

In 2011, the first international flight (excluding Macao and Hong Kong) arrived from Seoul's Incheon International Airport.

In 2015, the second terminal opened after an 18-month construction period.

== Airlines and destinations ==
=== Passenger ===
Airlines	Destinations
9 Air	Guangzhou, Shenyang
Air Busan	Busan
Air China	Beijing–Capital, Beijing–Daxing, Chengdu–Tianfu
Air Guilin	Kunming, Linyi, Xuzhou
Air Seoul	Seoul–Incheon
Batik Air Malaysia	Seasonal: Kota Kinabalu
China Eastern Airlines	Lanzhou, Nanjing, Xi'an, Yantai
China Express Airlines	Guiyang, Jieyang, Tianjin, Wuhan, Xi'an
China Southern Airlines	Guangzhou
Eastar Jet	Cheongju
Fuzhou Airlines	Fuzhou, Harbin, Xiamen, Xi'an
Greater Bay Airlines	Hong Kong
GX Airlines	Haikou, Nanning, Shenyang
Juneyao Air	Dalian, Nanjing, Shanghai–Pudong
Korean Air	Seoul–Incheon
Loong Air	Cheongju
Shandong Airlines	Qingdao, Shenyang
Shanghai Airlines	Shanghai–Pudong
Sichuan Airlines	Chengdu–Tianfu, Cheongju, Daegu, Nanjing, Seoul–Incheon, Xi'an
Trinity Airways	Daegu

=== Cargo ===
Airlines	Destinations
Central Airlines	Manila

== See also ==
- List of airports in the People's Republic of China
