= Trinity Airways =

Airline of South Korea

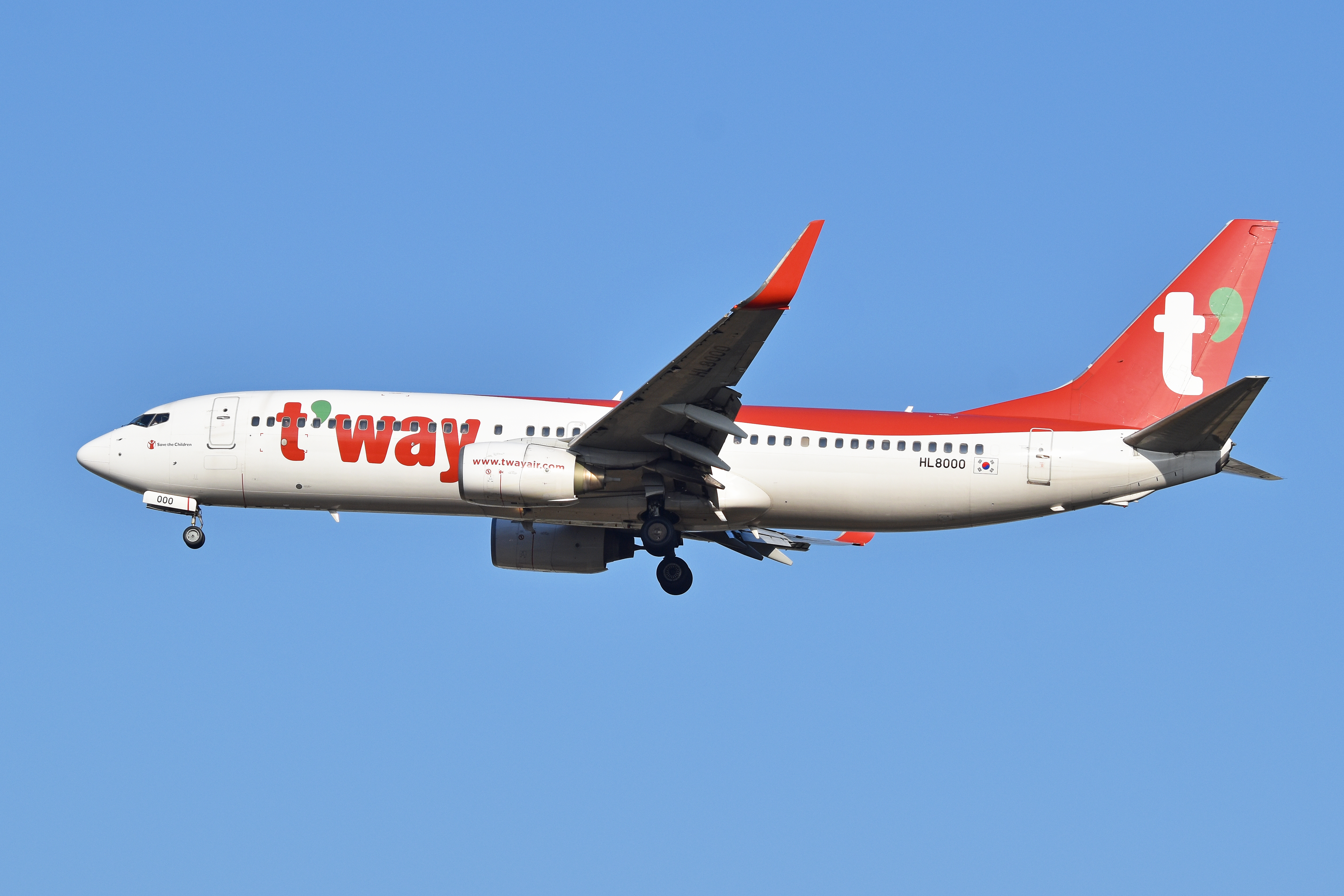
- Trinity Airways Boeing 737-800 in the former T’way Air livery
IATA	ICAO	Call sign
TW	TWB	SONOROUS
- Founded: 1 April 2005; 21 years ago (as Hansung Airlines); 13 August 2010; 16 years ago (as T'way Air); 8 September 2025; 14 months ago (as Trinity Airways)
- Commenced operations: 13 August 2005; 21 years ago (as Hansung Airlines); 16 September 2010; 16 years ago (as T'way Air); 10 September 2026; 2 months ago (as Trinity Airways)
- Hubs: Daegu; Seoul–Gimpo; Seoul–Incheon
- Fleet size: 48
- Destinations: 46
- Parent company: Sono Trinity Group
- Headquarters: 10th Floor, KT Daegu Tower, 167, Dongdeok-ro, Jung-gu, Daegu, South Korea
- Key people: Hong-Geun Jung (CEO)
- Website: www.trinityairways.com

Trinity Airways Co., Ltd. (Korean: 트리니티항공; RR: Teuriniti Hanggong), formerly Hansung Airlines (한성항공; Hanseong Hanggong) and T'way Air (/ˈtiːˌweɪ/; 티웨이항공; Ti-wei Hanggong), is a South Korean low-cost airline based in Seongsu-dong, Seongdong-gu, Seoul. It operates scheduled domestic, regional and long-haul flights from its two bases at Gimpo and Incheon.

== History ==
=== Hansung Airlines (2005–2009) ===
Trinity Airways' predecessor, Hansung Airlines, first obtained an air operator's certificate (AOC) in April 2005 and received its first aircraft, an ATR 72 for its inaugural domestic services between Cheongju and Jeju shortly after. Hansung Airlines had planned to expand to international routes and subsequently ordered 20 ATR 72-500 aircraft. However, due to financial difficulties, Hansung Airlines ceased operations in 2009.

=== T'way Air (2010–2026) ===
The former logo of T'way Air.

Hansung Airlines was reorganized and rebranded in 2010 after its shutdown. The 't' in T'way stands for together, today and tomorrow. The airline was established on 8 August 2010 with two Boeing 737-800 aircraft. The following month, the airline obtained a new air operator's certificate permitting domestic operations and commenced scheduled flights between Gimpo International Airport and Jeju International Airport.

In 2011, an additional AOC for international operations was granted. In October of the same year, T'way launched its first international service, to Bangkok. In 2013, the airline achieved a profit for the first time. In November that year, cargo services were launched.

As of 2019, it was the third largest Korean low-cost carrier in the international market, having carried 2.9 million domestic passengers and 4.2 million international passengers the year prior. Its international traffic had quadrupled in the three years leading up to 2019.

In April 2022, T'way received its first Airbus A330. In October 2022, T'way announced a route from Seoul to Sydney, which is its first long-haul connection. In October 2024, the airline inaugurated flights to Germany with a route between Seoul and Frankfurt, which it had been granted due to a concession deal as part of the merger of Korean Air and Asiana Airlines, which both serve Frankfurt. In the same month, the airline announced it plans to lease Boeing 777-300ER aircraft to facilitate its expansion plans until the delivery of its new Airbus A330neos.

=== Trinity Airways (2026–present) ===
The airline officially announced its rebrand to Trinity Airways on 8 September 2025, after being acquired by Daemyung Sono Group, with a change in livery. Daemyung Sono Group subsequently rebranded as Sono Trinity Group in May 2026. The new livery will consist of large billboard titles on the front of the aircraft with a grey stripe running on the underbelly. The tail has a grey background with a triangle consisting of three colors: pink, yellow, and blue. The full rebranding is expected begin in the second half of 2026. The name change received shareholder approval in March 2026 and will be actioned subject to receiving regulatory approval.

On 4 September 2026, T'way Air changed its callsign from TEEWAY to SONOROUS, in preparation for the official rebranding of the airline. On 10 September 2026, T'way Air ceased its branding and began to operate under Trinity Airways, after completing all merger procedures between T'way Air and Daemyung Sono Group. The first flight as Trinity Airways took place on the same day between Daegu and Jeju.

== Destinations ==
As of October 2026, Trinity Airways flies (or has flown) to the following destinations:

Country	City	Airport	Notes	Refs
Australia	Sydney	Sydney Airport		
Canada	Vancouver	Vancouver International Airport		
China	Guilin	Guilin Liangjiang International Airport ^{Charter}	Terminated	
China	Haikou	Haikou Meilan International Airport		
China	Jinan	Jinan Yaoqiang International Airport		
China	Nanning	Nanning Wuxu International Airport	Terminated	
China	Qingdao	Qingdao Jiaodong International Airport		
China	Qingdao	Qingdao Liuting International Airport	Airport closed	
China	Sanya	Sanya Phoenix International Airport		
China	Shenyang	Shenyang Taoxian International Airport		
China	Wenzhou	Wenzhou Longwan International Airport		
China	Xuzhou	Xuzhou Guanyin International Airport ^{Charter}	Terminated	
China	Yanji	Yanji Chaoyangchuan International Airport	Terminated	
China	Wuhan	Wuhan Tianhe International Airport		
China	Zhangjiajie	Zhangjiajie Hehua International Airport		
Croatia	Zagreb	Zagreb Airport	Seasonal	
France	Paris	Paris Charles de Gaulle Airport		
Germany	Frankfurt	Frankfurt Airport	Terminated	
Guam	Hagåtña	Antonio B. Won Pat International Airport		
Hong Kong	Hong Kong	Hong Kong International Airport		
Indonesia	Denpasar	Ngurah Rai International Airport]	Terminated	
Indonesia	Jakarta	Soekarno–Hatta International Airport		
Italy	Rome	Rome Fiumicino Airport		
Japan	Fukuoka	Fukuoka Airport		
Japan	Kagoshima	Kagoshima Airport	Seasonal	
Japan	Kobe	Kobe Airport	Begins 18 December 2026	
Japan	Kumamoto	Kumamoto Airport	Seasonal	
Japan	Nagoya	Chubu Centrair International Airport		
Japan	Naha	Naha Airport		
Japan	Ōita	Oita Airport	Seasonal	
Japan	Osaka	Kansai International Airport		
Japan	Saga	Saga Airport	Seasonal	
Japan	Sapporo	New Chitose Airport		
Japan	Tokyo	Narita International Airport		
Kyrgyzstan	Bishkek	Manas International Airport		
Laos	Vientiane	Wattay International Airport	Resumes 7 January 2027	
Macau	Macau	Macau International Airport		
Malaysia	Kota Kinabalu	Kota Kinabalu International Airport		
Mongolia	Ulaanbaatar	Chinggis Khaan International Airport		
Northern Mariana Islands	Saipan	Saipan International Airport		
Philippines	Cebu	Mactan–Cebu International Airport		
Philippines	Clark	Clark International Airport	Terminated	
Philippines	Kalibo	Kalibo International Airport		
Russia	Khabarovsk	Khabarovsk Novy Airport	Terminated	
Russia	Vladivostok	Vladivostok International Airport	Terminated	
Singapore	Singapore	Changi Airport		
South Korea	Busan	Gimhae International Airport		
South Korea	Cheongju	Cheongju International Airport		
South Korea	Daegu	Daegu International Airport	Hub	
South Korea	Gwangju	Gwangju Airport		
South Korea	Jeju	Jeju International Airport		
South Korea	Muan	Muan International Airport	Terminated	
South Korea	Seoul	Gimpo International Airport	Hub	
South Korea	Seoul	Incheon International Airport	Hub	
South Korea	Yangyang	Yangyang International Airport	Terminated	
Spain	Barcelona	Josep Tarradellas Barcelona–El Prat Airport		
Taiwan	Kaohsiung	Kaohsiung International Airport		
Taiwan	Taichung	Taichung International Airport		
Taiwan	Taipei	Songshan Airport		
Taiwan	Taipei	Taoyuan International Airport		
Thailand	Bangkok	Don Mueang International Airport	Terminated	
Thailand	Bangkok	Suvarnabhumi Airport		
Thailand	Chiang Mai	Chiang Mai International Airport	Resumes 7 January 2027	
Uzbekistan	Tashkent	Tashkent International Airport		
Vietnam	Da Nang	Da Nang International Airport		
Vietnam	Hanoi	Noi Bai International Airport		
Vietnam	Ho Chi Minh City	Tan Son Nhat International Airport		
Vietnam	Nha Trang	Cam Ranh International Airport		

=== Codeshare agreements ===
Trinity Airways codeshares with the following airlines:

- Eastar Jet
- Tigerair Taiwan

=== Interline agreements ===
Trinity Airways has interline agreements with the following airlines:

- Air Premia
- ITA Airways
- Virgin Australia

== Fleet ==
=== Current fleet ===
As of July 2026, Trinity Airways operates the following aircraft:

Trinity Airways fleet
Aircraft	In service	Orders	Passengers					Notes
Aircraft	In service	Orders	F	J	W	Y	Total	Notes
Airbus A330-200	6	—	—	18	—	228	246	Leased from Korean Air.
Airbus A330-200	6	—	—	18	—	242	260	Leased from Korean Air.
Airbus A330-300	5	—	—	12	—	335	347	
Airbus A330-300	5	—	—	12	—	365	377	
Airbus A330-900	—	5	TBA					To be delivered from 2026.
Boeing 737-800	27	—	—	—	—	189	189	
Boeing 737 MAX 8	8	12	—	—	—	189	189	Deliveries from 2022.
Boeing 777-300ER	2	—	6	53	34	201	294	Leased from Korean Air.
Boeing 777-300ER	2	—	—	40	32	296	368	Ex-Cathay Pacific aircraft to be used on European routes.
Total	48	17						

=== Former fleet ===
As of June 2025, T'way Air operated 6 Airbus A330-200, 5 Airbus A330-300, 26 Boeing 737-800, 4 Boeing 737-8 MAX and 2 Boeing 777-300ER.

Trinity Airways and its predecessor brands have previously operated the following aircraft types:

Trinity Airways retired fleet
Aircraft	Total	Introduced	Retired	Notes
ATR 72-200	4	2006	2008	
