= Gimhae International Airport =

Commercial airport in western Busan, South Korea

Gimhae International Airport 김해국제공항
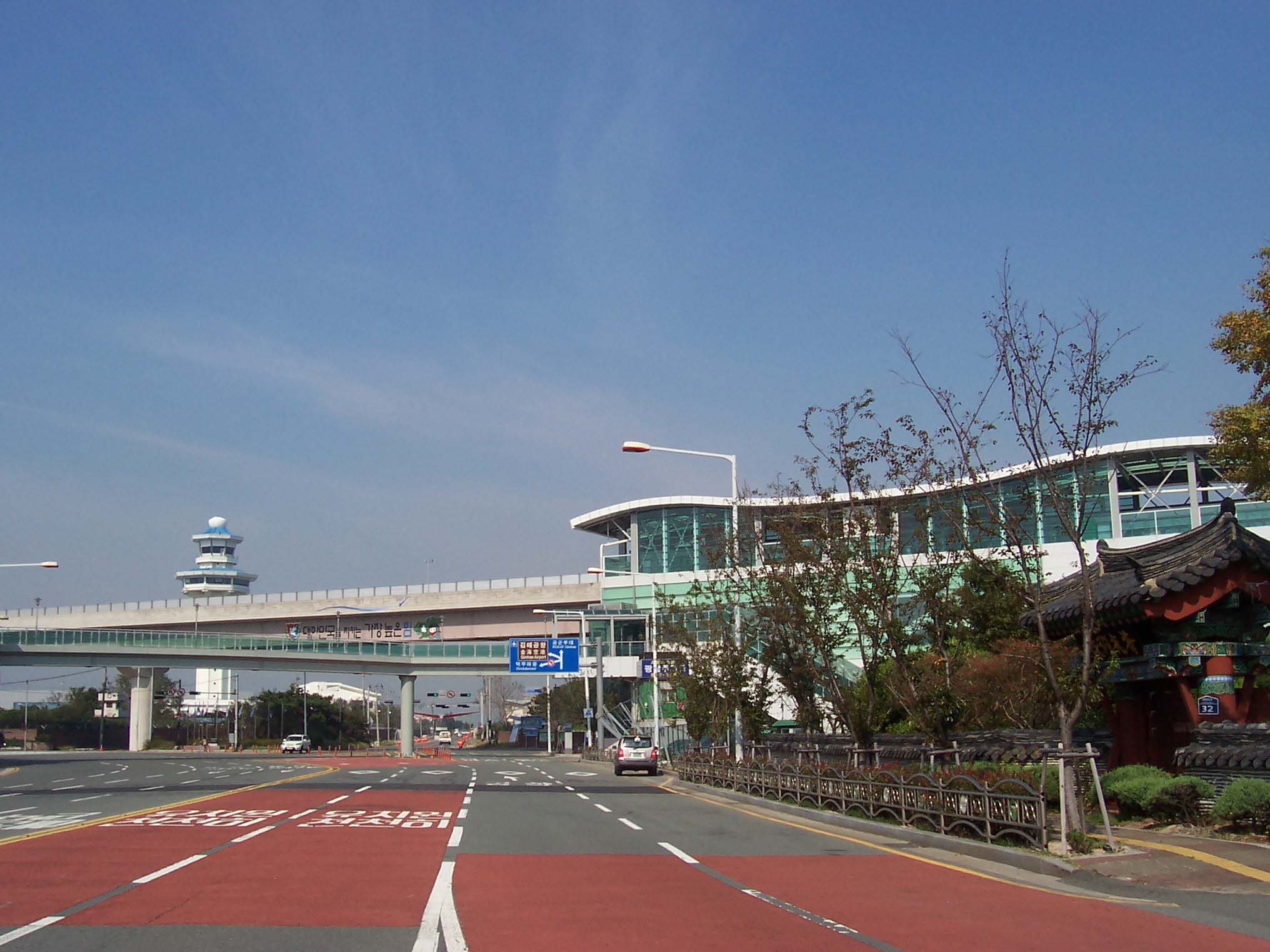
- IATA: PUS; ICAO: RKPK

Summary
- Airport type: Public / military
- Owner: Ministry of Land, Infrastructure and Transport
- Operator: Korea Airports Corporation; Republic of Korea Air Force
- Serves: Busan–Gyeongnam Area and Gyeongsang Province
- Location: Gangseo District, Busan, South Korea
- Opened: 1 August 1976; 50 years ago
- Hub for: Air Busan; Eastar Jet; Jeju Air; Jin Air; Korean Air
- Elevation AMSL: 6 ft (1.8 m)
- Coordinates: 35°10′46″N 128°56′18″E
- Website: www.airport.co.kr/gimhaeeng/

Map
- Location of airport in Busan Location of airport in South Korea

Runways
Direction	Length		Surface
Direction	m	ft	Surface
18L/36R	2,743	9,007	Concrete
18R/36L	3,200	10,499	Concrete

Statistics (2024)
- Aircraft movements: 94,870
- International passengers: 9,005,803
- Domestic passengers: 6,746,655
- Total passengers: 15,752,458
- Sources: World Aero Data; Korea Airports Corporation

- Gimhae International Airport
- Hangul: 김해국제공항
- Hanja: 金海國際空港
- RR: Gimhae gukjegonghang
- MR: Kimhae kukchegonghang

Gimhae International Airport (IATA: PUS, ICAO: RKPK) also known as Busan Airport is located on the western end of Busan, the second-largest city in South Korea. Opened in 1976, the airport is named after the nearby city of Gimhae. A new international terminal opened on 31 October 2007. Gimhae International Airport is the main hub for Air Busan and Korean Air, and an operating base for Jeju Air and Jin Air. Runway 18L/36R is used for military purposes only for Gimhae Air Base, but due to increasing traffic, there are plans to open the runway for airliners. In 2018, 17,064,613 passengers used the airport.

As the airport is now beyond its design capacity and surrounded by mountains, buildings and other objectives, a new airport is currently being built on Gadeokdo to meet growing demand. Because the airport is shared with military facilities, photography and video of the apron, runway, and military stations are prohibited according to the airport website.

== History ==
In August 1976, Gimhae Airport opened, and commercial air traffic shifted there from the old airport. A new domestic terminal was completed in May 1983. Korean Air launched a route to Honolulu in October 1992. In April 2002, Northwest Airlines began service to its hub at Tokyo's Narita Airport, where people could board connecting flights to the United States. In March 2007, Lufthansa inaugurated service to Munich via Seoul. This was the first route between Busan and Europe. President Roh Moo-hyun opened a new international terminal seven months later. Delta Air Lines, which had merged with Northwest, ended the Tokyo link in May 2012. Lufthansa terminated its flight to Busan in March 2014.

== Airlines and destinations ==
=== Passenger ===
Airlines	Destinations
Air Busan	Bangkok–Suvarnabhumi, Chengdu–Tianfu, Cebu, Da Nang, Denpasar, Guam, Guangzhou (begins 2 December 2026), Hong Kong, Kaohsiung, Kota Kinabalu, Macau, Matsuyama, Nha Trang, Osaka–Kansai, Qingdao, Sanya, Shizuoka, Sapporo–Chitose, Takamatsu, Tokyo–Narita, Ulaanbaatar, Vientiane, Xi'an, Yanji, Zhangjiajie; Seasonal: Nagasaki (resumes 5 January 2027)
Air China	Beijing–Capital
China Airlines	Taipei–Taoyuan
China Eastern Airlines	Nanjing, Shanghai–Pudong
China Southern Airlines	Shenyang
Eastar Jet	Almaty, Chiang Mai, Fukuoka, Hangzhou (begins 3 December 2026), Hong Kong, Kumamoto, Naha, Osaka–Kansai, Phu Quoc Sapporo–Chitose, Seoul–Gimpo, Taipei–Taoyuan, Xiamen
EVA Air	Taipei–Taoyuan
HK Express	Hong Kong
Jeju Air	Bangkok–Suvarnabhumi, Cebu, Fukuoka, Osaka–Kansai, Kaohsiung, Manila (begins 17 December 2026), Phu Quoc, Sapporo–Chitose, Shijiazhuang, Singapore, Tagbilaran, Taipei–Taoyuan, Zhangjiajie
Jin Air	Bangkok–Suvarnabhumi (resumes 24 December 2026), Cebu, Clark, Da Nang, Fukuoka, Miyakojima, Nagoya–Centrair, Naha, Nha Trang, Osaka–Kansai, Phu Quoc, Sapporo–Chitose, Taichung, Taipei–Taoyuan, Tokyo–Narita
Korean Air	Bangkok–Suvarnabhumi, Beijing–Capital, Da Nang, Guam, Jeju, Nagoya–Centrair, Qingdao, Seoul–Gimpo, Seoul–Incheon,^{1} Shanghai–Pudong, Taipei–Taoyuan, Tokyo–Narita; Seasonal: Da Nang
Loong Air	Hangzhou
Malaysia Airlines	Kuala Lumpur–International (resumes 2 December 2026)
MIAT Mongolian Airlines	Ulaanbaatar
Philippine Airlines	Manila
Shanghai Airlines	Shanghai–Pudong
Singapore Airlines	Singapore
Spring Airlines	Shanghai–Pudong
Starlux Airlines	Taichung, Taipei–Taoyuan
Tigerair Taiwan	Taipei–Taoyuan
Trinity Airways	Da Nang, Fukuoka, Hong Kong, Kaohsiung, Nha Trang, Osaka–Kansai, Sapporo–Chitose, Tokyo–Narita
VietJet Air	Da Nang, Hanoi, Ho Chi Minh City, Nha Trang, Phu Quoc
Vietnam Airlines	Hanoi, Ho Chi Minh City, Nha Trang

== Statistics ==
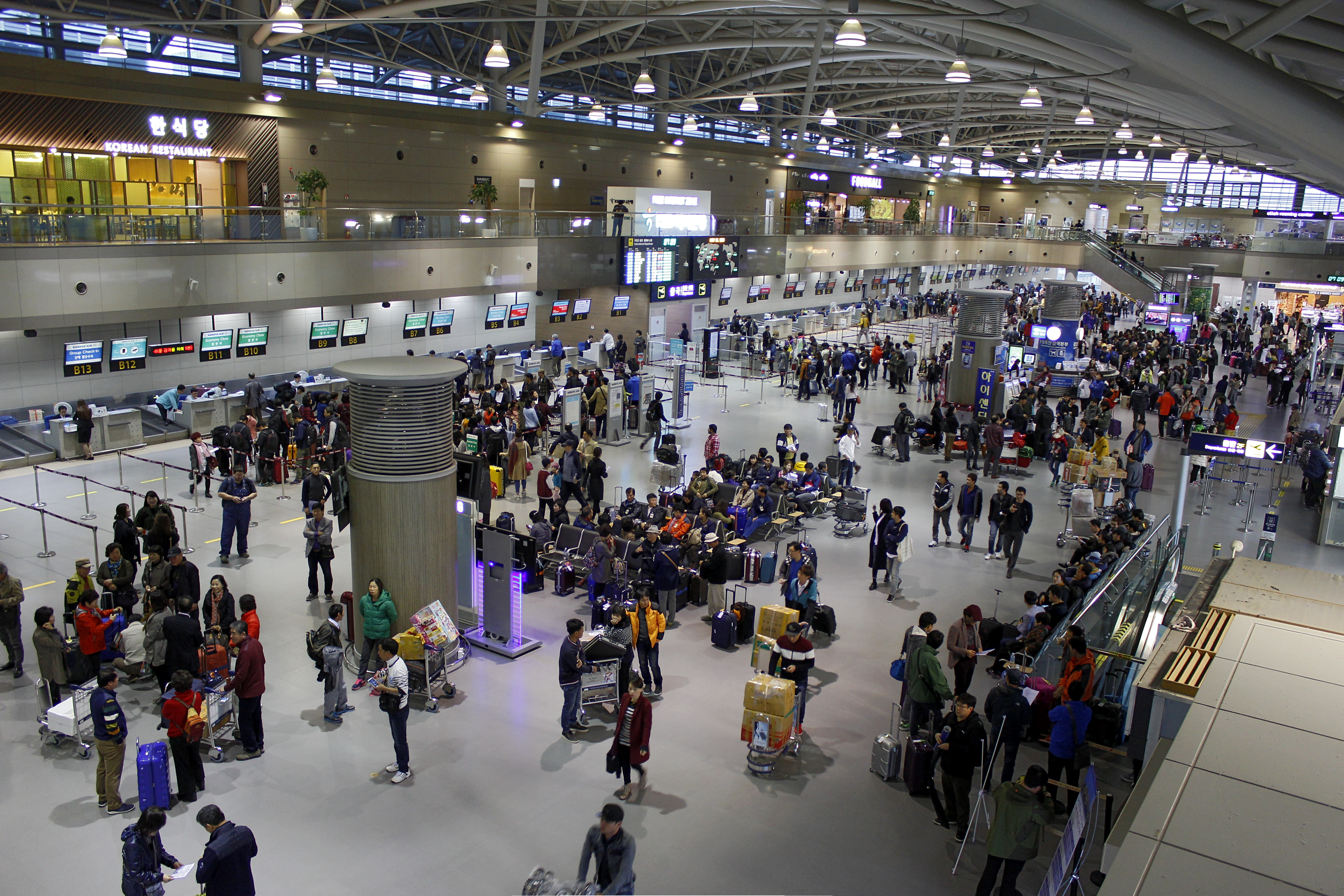
Terminal interior

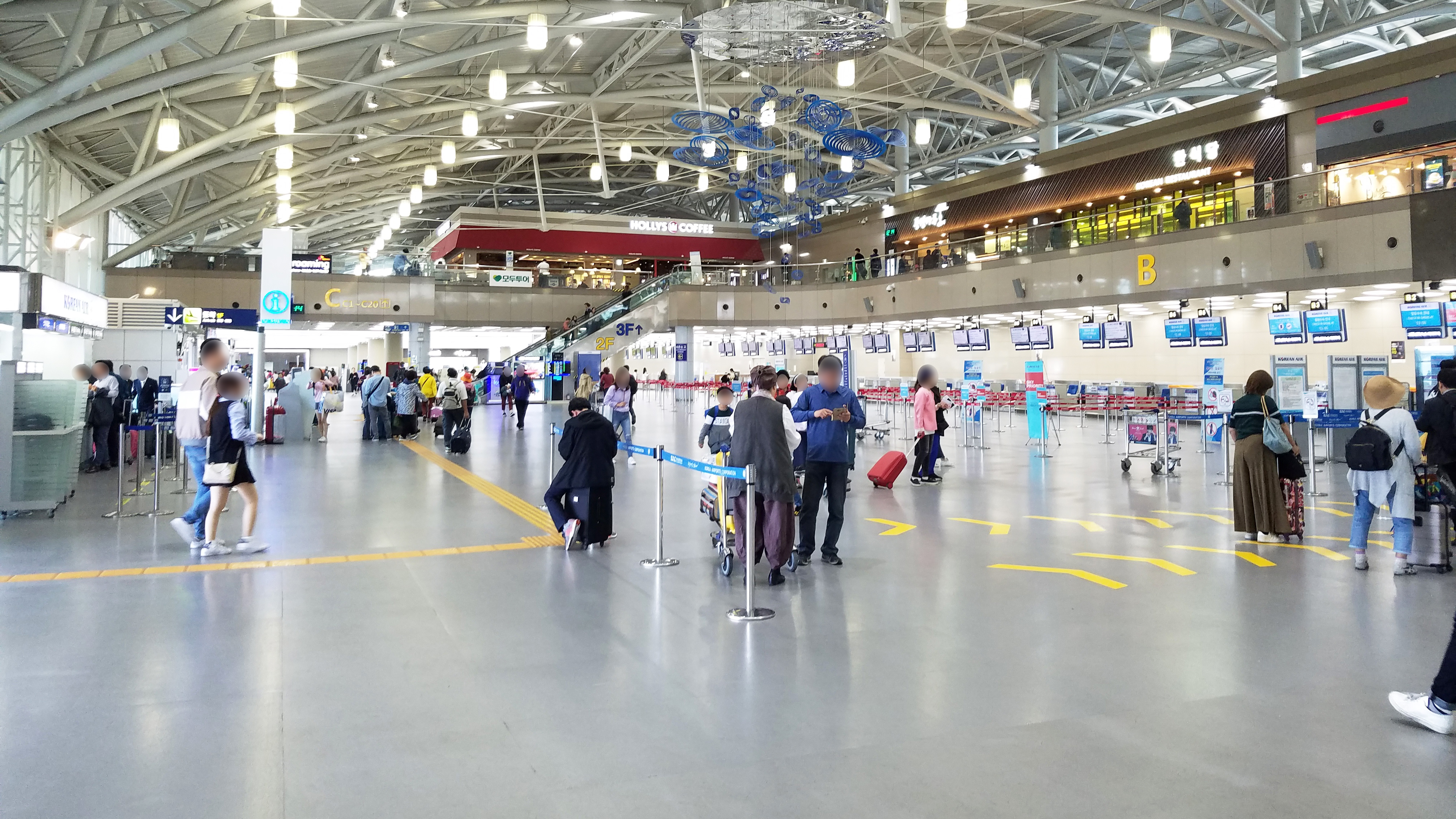
Terminal interior

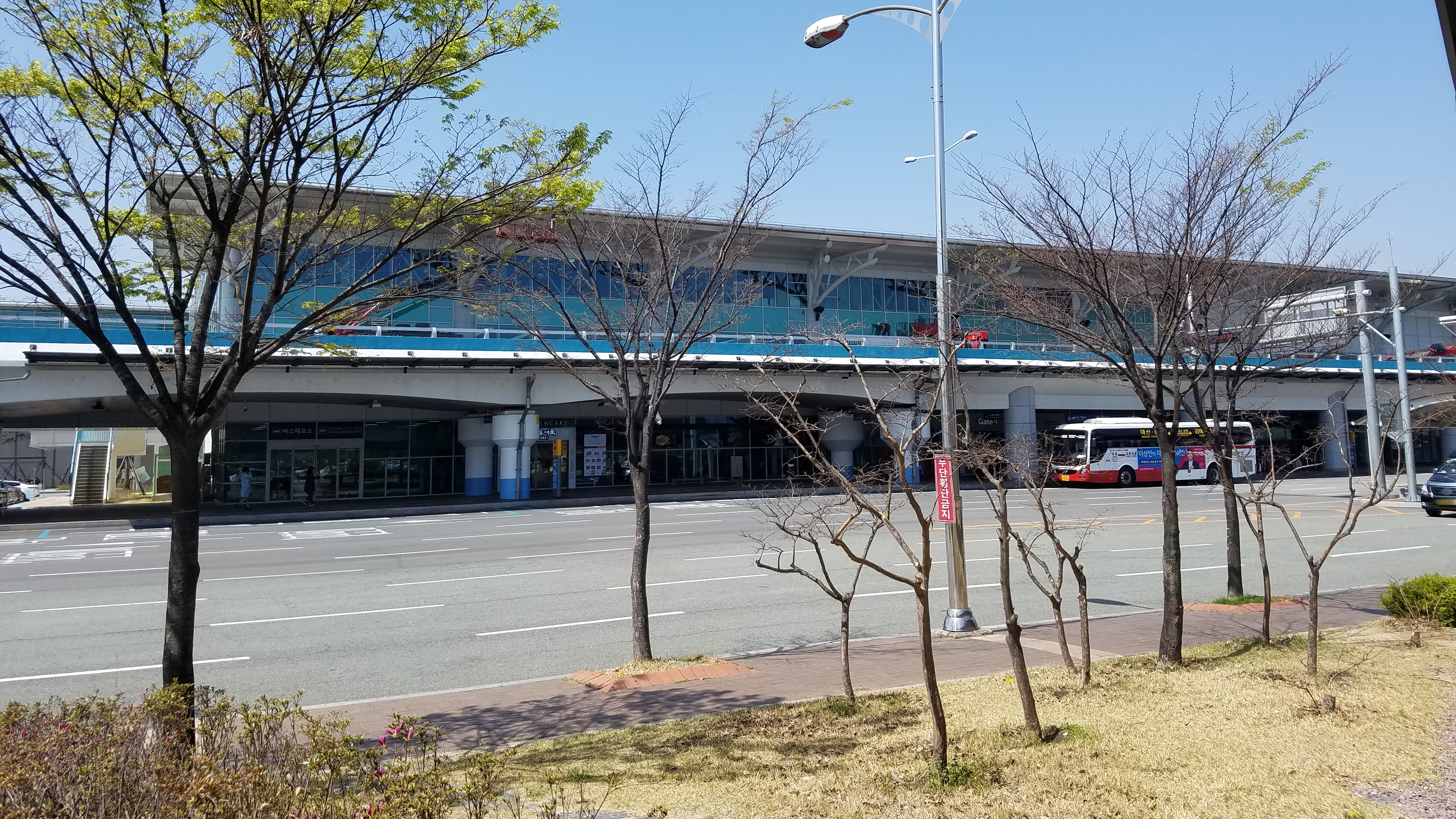
Terminal exterior

=== Passengers ===
Air traffic statistics
	Aircraft operations	Passenger volume	Cargo tonnage
2001	61,242	9,168,089	203,335
2002	60,090	9,173,288	204,464
2003	58,600	8,782,835	185,372
2004	52,212	7,674,153	175,850
2005	50,735	7,045,806	152,407
2006	52,935	7,071,037	135,607
2007	58,119	7,403,262	126,947
2008	59,575	7,202,117	113,710
2009	61,171	6,870,157	105,320
2010	62,225	8,160,546	119,390
2011	66,525	8,749,153	126,710
2012	71,713	9,196,090	121,256
2013	77,665	9,671,381	116,185
2014	78,646	10,378,867	123,242
2015	87,709	12,382,150	146,694
2016	99,358	14,900,815	185,472
2017	107,363	16,403,541	186,471
2018	110,924	17,064,613	183,507
2019	111,276	16,931,023	171,953
2020	53,150	7,235,652	48,250
2021	57,694	8,859,304	36,010
2022	61,733	10,027,097	55,555
Source: Korea Airports Corporation Traffic Statistics

== Transport ==
The airport is accesible by the Gimhae International Airport station of the Busan-Gimhae Light Rail Transit.

== See also ==
- Gimhae Air Base
- Transportation in South Korea
