= Gwangju Airport =

Airport in Gwangju, South Korea

Gwangju Airport 광주공항
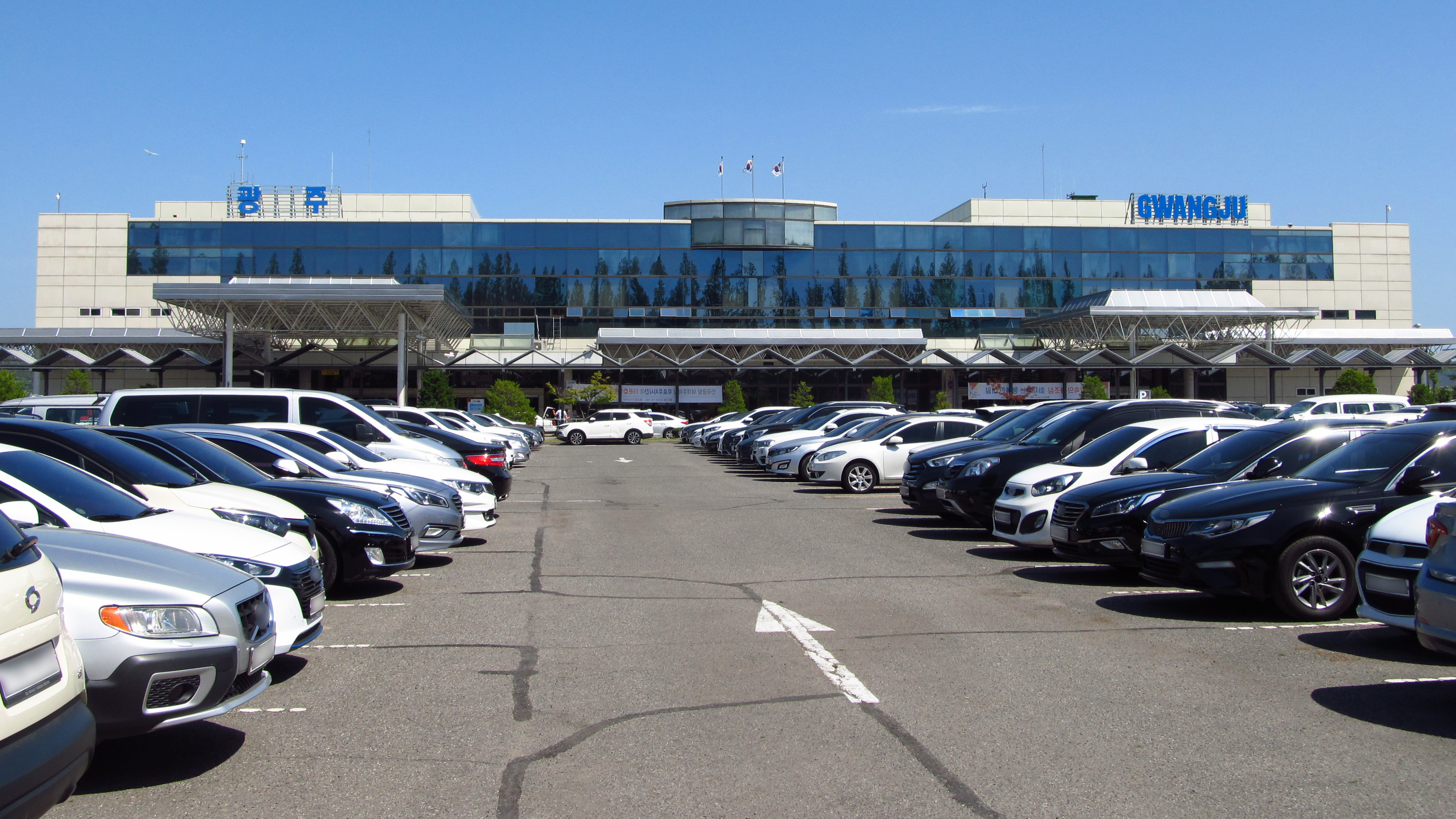
- IATA: KWJ; ICAO: RKJJ

Summary
- Airport type: Public / Military
- Owner: Ministry of Land, Infrastructure and Transport
- Operator: Korea Airports Corporation; Republic of Korea Air Force
- Location: Sinchon-dong, Gwangsan District, Gwangju, South Korea
- Opened: November 1964; 61 years ago
- Elevation AMSL: 49 ft (15 m)
- Coordinates: 35°07′35″N 126°48′32″E
- Website: www.airport.co.kr/gwangjueng/index.do

Map
- Location of airport in South Korea

Runways
| Direction | Length | | Surface |
| Direction | m | ft | Surface |
|---|---|---|---|
| 04R/22L | 2,835 | 9,300 | Concrete |
| 04L/22R | 2,835 | 9,300 | Concrete |

Statistics (2019)
- Passengers: 2,026,651
- Aircraft movements: 13,297
- Tonnes of cargo: 12,500
- Statistics from KAC

- Gwangju Airport
- Hangul: 광주공항
- Hanja: 光州空港
- RR: Gwangju gonghang
- MR: Kwangju konghang

Gwangju Airport (IATA: KWJ, ICAO: RKJJ) is an airport in Gwangju, South Korea, and is managed by the Korea Airports Corporation. In 2018, 1,986,125 passengers used the airport. This airport is planned to close when Muan International Airport becomes more established. Because Gwangju Airport is sharing location with a military base, taking photographs or videos of the apron, runway or military facility is strictly prohibited.

== History ==
The airport was established in November 1948. It saw its first commercial flight in 1950. At the time, however, it was not located in Gwangju but in neighboring Jangseong, on a military training facility. The airport moved to its present location in Sinchon-dong, Gwangsan District, in 1964. It was taken over by the Korea Airports Corporation in 1990. The current airport terminal was built in 1994, at which time the old terminal was repurposed as a Cargo terminal.

== Airlines and destinations ==
| Airlines | Destinations |
|---|---|
| Asiana Airlines | Jeju, Seoul–Gimpo |
| Jeju Air | Jeju |
| Jin Air | Jeju |
| Korean Air | Jeju |
| Trinity Airways | Jeju |

== Statistics ==
Traffic by calendar year
| | Aircraft operations | Passenger volume | Cargo tonnage |
|---|---|---|---|
| 2001 | 12,660 | 2,234,855 | 30,628 |
| 2002 | 14,056 | 2,129,521 | 30,750 |
| 2003 | 16,112 | 2,081,031 | 32,979 |
| 2004 | 15,185 | 1,879,968 | 28,260 |
| 2005 | 13,715 | 1,642,129 | 24,771 |
| 2006 | 13,558 | 1,629,787 | 23,872 |
| 2007 | 12,700 | 1,539,187 | 22,942 |
| 2008 | 11,166 | 1,380,636 | 16,409 |
| 2009 | 10,747 | 1,363,122 | 13,146 |
| 2010 | 10,315 | 1,348,847 | 15,388 |
| 2011 | 10,781 | 1,375,839 | 15,317 |
| 2012 | 10,899 | 1,380,071 | 14,662 |
| 2013 | 10,819 | 1,332,234 | 15,143 |
| 2014 | 11,574 | 1,470,096 | 15,373 |
| 2015 | 12,258 | 1,604,905 | 15,796 |
| 2016 | 10,792 | 1,613,775 | 14,818 |
| 2017 | 12,678 | 1,946,605 | 15,592 |
| 2018 | 13,546 | 1,986,125 | 14,477 |
| 2019 | 13,297 | 2,026,651 | 12,500 |
| 2020 | 13,575 | 1,726,483 | 7,428 |
| 2021 | 14,764 | 2,152,892 | 8,679 |
| 2022 | 12,916 | 2,068,625 | 9,144 |
| 2023 | 13,277 | 2,050,378 | 9,549 |
Source: Korea Airports Corporation Traffic Statistics

== Ground transportation ==
=== Metro ===
- Airport station of Gwangju Metro Line 1 :

Line: Pyeongdong - Songjeongri(KTX Station) - Airport - Sangmu - Nongseong - Geumnamro4ga - Nokdong

==== Bus ====
- No. Songjeong 97 : Airport ↔ Gwangju Songjeong Station ↔ Daesan ↔ Chilseong ↔ Gwangam
- No. Seonun 101 : Airport ↔ Songjeong Park Station ↔ Gwangsan Police Station ↔ Honam University Gwangsan Campus
- No. 1000 : Airport ↔ Gwangju Songjeong Station ↔ Kim Daejung Convention Center ↔ City Hall ↔ U Square(Gwangju Bus Terminal) ↔ Geumnam-ro ↔ Chosun University ↔ Gwangju Court ↔ Jisan Yuwonji
- No. 1160(Naju) : Airport ↔ Naju ↔ Yeongsanpo Bus Terminal

== See also ==
- Transportation in South Korea
