= Cam Ranh International Airport =

International airport serving Nha Trang, Vietnam

Cam Ranh International Airport Sân bay quốc tế Cam Ranh Cảng hàng không quốc tế Cam Ranh
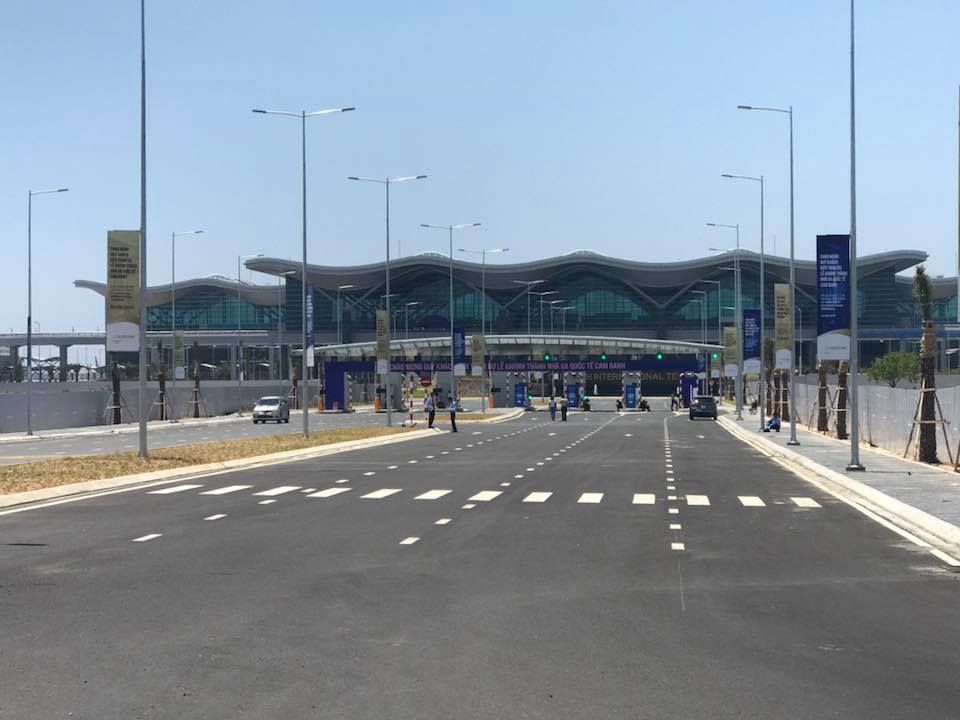
- Terminal 2 - Cam Ranh International Airport

- IATA: CXR; ICAO: VVCR

Summary
- Airport type: Public / military
- Owner/Operator: Airports Corporation of Vietnam
- Serves: Nha Trang
- Location: Cam Ranh Bay, Bắc Cam Ranh, Khánh Hòa, Vietnam
- Opened: 19 May 2004; 22 years ago
- Operating base for: VietJet Air
- Elevation AMSL: 12 m (39 ft)
- Coordinates: 11°59′53″N 109°13′10″E
- Website: www.camranh.aero/vi

Map
- Location of airport in Vietnam

Runways
Direction	Length		Surface
Direction	m	ft	Surface
02L/20R	3,048	10,000	Concrete
02R/20L	3,048	10,000	Concrete

Statistics (2019)
- Total passengers: 9,747,172 ▲18.2%
- Source: Taseco Airs

Cam Ranh International Airport (IATA: CXR, ICAO: VVCR) is an international airport located on Cam Ranh Bay in Bắc Cam Ranh, a ward in Khánh Hòa province in Vietnam. It serves the area of Nha Trang, the capital of Khánh Hòa province, which is 30 km (16 NM) from the airport. This airport handled 9,747,172 passengers in 2019, making it the fourth busiest airport in Vietnam, after Ho Chi Minh City, Hanoi and Da Nang, and one of the fastest growing airports in the country.

Cam Ranh is the only airport in Vietnam that handles more international passengers than domestic passengers, with international passengers accounting for 70% in 2018.

Cam Ranh Terminal 1 is used for domestic flights and Cam Ranh Terminal 2 (managed by Cam Ranh International Terminal (CRTC) JSC) is used for international flights.

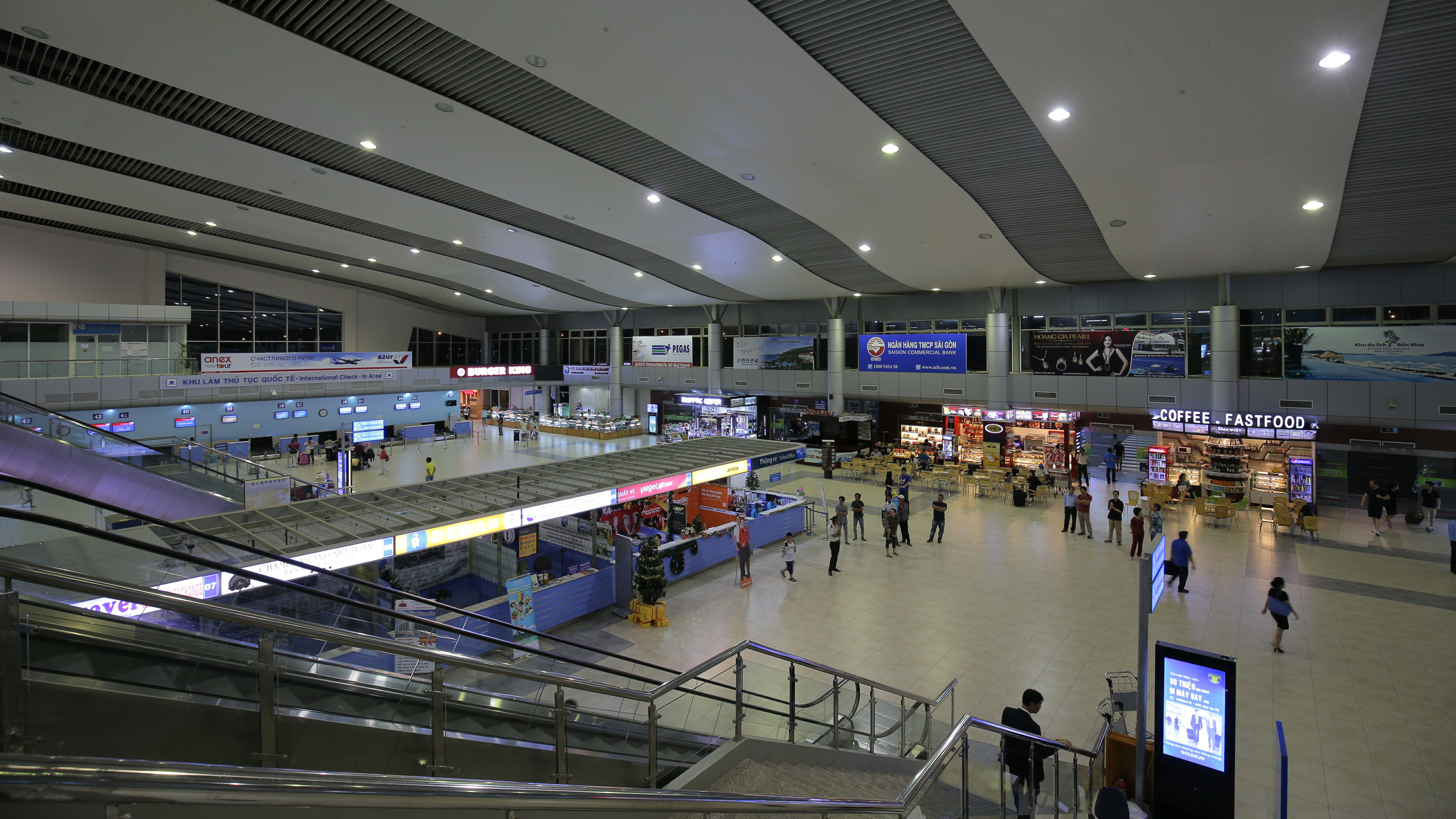
Terminal 1 Main Hall

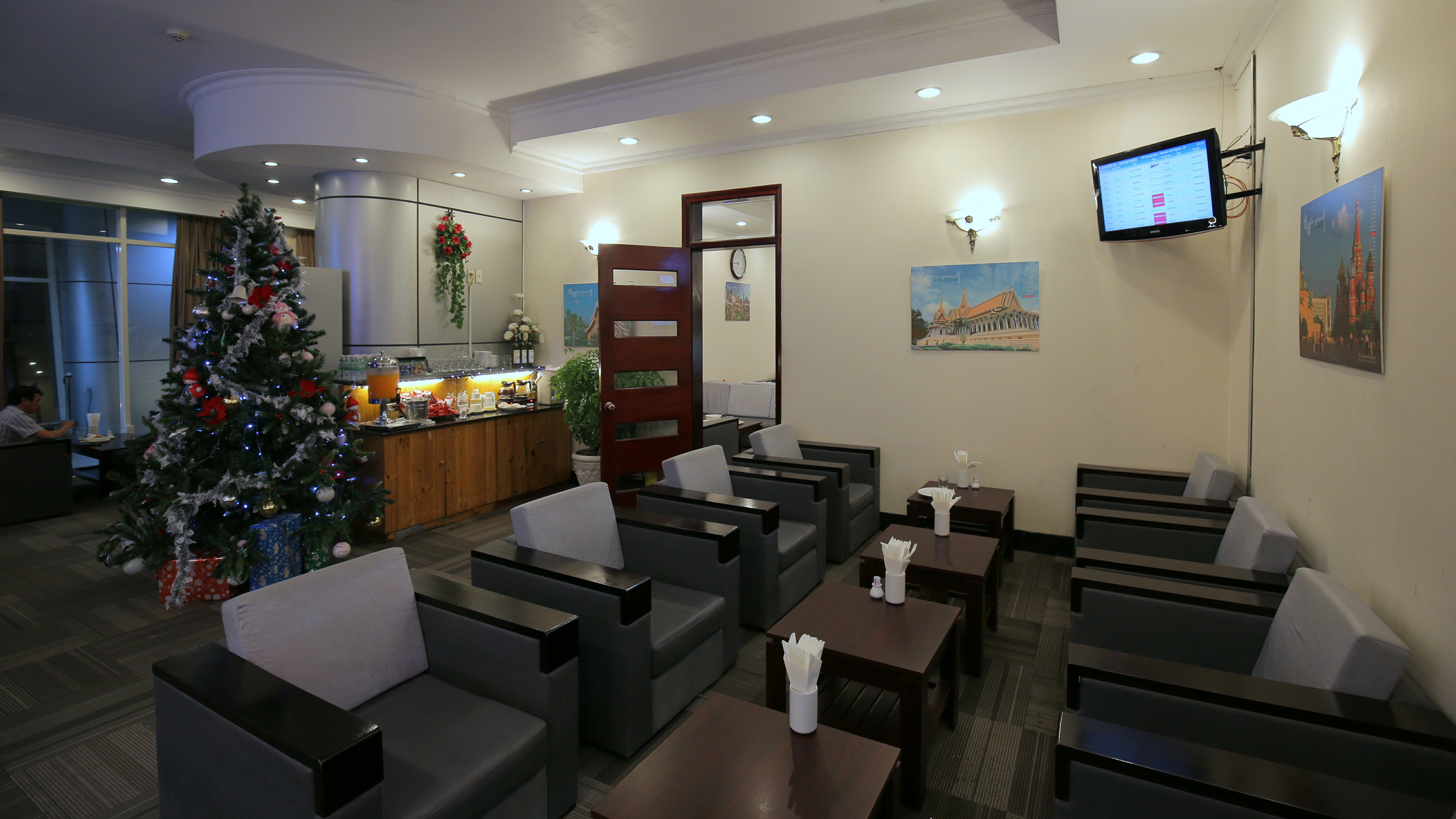
Terminal 1 Business Lounge

== Facilities ==
=== Runway ===
The airport resides at an elevation of 40 feet (12 m) above mean sea level. The first runway, designated 02L/20R, with a concrete surface measuring 10,000 by 150 feet (3,048 m × 46 m). The second runway, designated 02R/20L, was opened in October 2019 with a concrete surface measuring 10,000 by 150 feet (3,048 m × 46 m).

=== Terminal 1 ===
A new passenger terminal of Cam Ranh International Airport started construction in 2007 and was inaugurated on 12 December 2009. The terminal covers an area of 14,000 square metres (150,000 sq ft) with a capacity of 800 passengers (600 domestic and 200 international) per hour. It has two aerobridges. The terminal was upgraded between 2015 and 2016, increasing its capacity from 1.5 million to the maximum of 2.7 million passengers which initiated the plan from Khanh Hoa provincial People's Committee and the Vietnam Airlines Corporation for a new terminal to be built in order to meet the increasing demand of passengers.

=== Terminal 2 ===
Terminal 2, which is built by Turner Construction Company was inaugurated and started the operation on 30 June 2018. T2 covers a total area of 50,500 square metres (544,000 sq ft), a three-storey terminal which has dedicated levels for departure and arrival processing. The terminal building has a unique architecture inspired by the shape of a swallow's nest, native to the Khanh Hoa Province, and the waves of Nha Trang Bay - a signature representation of the South Central Coast. T2 has four aerobridges, 10 boarding gates, six baggage carousels, 80 check-in counters arranged in four rows as well as advanced equipment systems supplied by prestigious international companies.

== Airlines and destinations ==
Airlines	Destinations
Aero Nomad Airlines	Seasonal charter: Bishkek
Aeroflot	Irkutsk, Moscow–Sheremetyevo, Novosibirsk, Vladivostok, Yekaterinburg
Air Astana	Almaty, Astana
Air Busan	Busan, Seoul–Incheon
Air Cambodia	Phnom Penh
Air Seoul	Seoul–Incheon
AirAsia	Kuala Lumpur–International
Asiana Airlines	Seoul–Incheon
Azur Air	Seasonal charter: Barnaul, Blagoveshchensk, Irkutsk, Khabarovsk, Krasnoyarsk–International, Novokuznetsk, Novosibirsk, Tomsk, Ufa, Vladivostok
Bamboo Airways	Hanoi, Ho Chi Minh City
Belavia	Minsk
Centrum Air	Tashkent
China Southern Airlines	Guangzhou
Eastar Jet	Seoul–Incheon
Hainan Airlines	Guangzhou, Shenzhen
HK Express	Hong Kong
Ikar	Seasonal charter: Irkutsk, Kazan, Khabarovsk, Krasnoyarsk–International, Moscow–Sheremetyevo, Saint Petersburg, Yekaterinburg
IrAero	Seasonal charter: Chita, Irkutsk
Jeju Air	Seoul–Incheon
Jin Air	Busan, Seoul–Incheon
Korean Air	Seoul–Incheon
Lucky Air	Kunming
Nordwind Airlines	Seasonal charter: Moscow–Sheremetyevo
Pacific Airlines	Changsha, Guiyang, Hanoi, Ho Chi Minh City, Muan, Vinh
Parata Air	Seoul–Incheon
Qanot Sharq	Tashkent
Scoot	Singapore
Sichuan Airlines	Chengdu–Tianfu, Guangzhou, Xining
Sunday Airlines	Seasonal charter: Yekaterinburg
Sun PhuQuoc Airways	Dong Hoi, Hanoi, Phu Quoc
Thai AirAsia	Bangkok–Don Mueang
Trinity Airways	Busan, Cheongju, Daegu, Seoul–Incheon
Uzbekistan Airways	Tashkent
VietJet Air	Busan, Can Tho, Changchun, Chongqing, Da Nang, Daegu, Hai Phong, Hanoi, Ho Chi Minh City, Nanjing, Seoul–Incheon, Shenyang, Singapore, Taipei–Taoyuan, Tianjin, Ulaanbaatar, Vinh; Seasonal charter: Barnaul, Blagoveshchensk, Irkutsk, Kazan, Khabarovsk, Krasnoyarsk–International, Novokuznstesk, Novosibirsk, Tomsk, Ufa, Vladivostok, Yekaterinburg (begins 1 November 2026)
Vietnam Airlines	Beijing–Capital, Busan, Da Nang, Hai Phong, Hanoi, Ho Chi Minh City, Nanjing, Seoul–Incheon, Shanghai–Pudong, Singapore, Tianjin, Vinh

== Statistics ==
Sources: Airport, ACV³

Year	Total	International
2008	683,000	
2009		
2010		
2011	1,000,000	
2012	1,095,776	
2013	1,509,212	
2014	2,062,494	
2015	2,722,833	889,820
2016	4,858,362	2,244,786
2017	6,400,000	3,650,903
2018	8,250,000	5,211,987
2019	9,747,172	6,500,000
2020	3,305,057	
2021	972,817	17,963
2022	3,860,541	335,118
2023	5,700,000	2,400,000

== See also ==
- List of airports in Vietnam
