= Jeju Air =

Low-cost airline of South Korea

Jeju Air 제주항공

- A Jeju Air Boeing 737-800
IATA	ICAO	Call sign
7C	JJA	JEJU AIR
- Founded: 25 January 2005; 21 years ago
- Operating bases: Busan; Jeju; Seoul–Gimpo; Seoul–Incheon
- Frequent-flyer program: Refresh Point
- Fleet size: 45
- Destinations: 41
- Parent company: Aekyung Group
- Headquarters: Jeju City, Jeju Province
- Employees: 2,700
- Website: www.jejuair.net

Korean name
- Hangul: 제주항공
- Hanja: 濟州航空
- RR: Jeju hanggong
- MR: Cheju hanggong

Jeju Air Co., Ltd. (Korean: 제주항공) is the first and the largest South Korean low-cost airline. Named after Jeju Island, the airline is headquartered in Jeju City with its largest base at Jeju International Airport. It was a founding member of the Value Alliance.

Aekyung Group is Jeju Air's largest shareholder, and Jeju Air is the largest shareholder in AK Holdings, the holding company of Aekyung Group. In 2024, it was reported that AK Holdings has injected over 600 billion won to Jeju Air in the previous four years. Jeju Air is the most profitable among AK Group's five subsidiaries.

Jeju Air is the first Korean LCC to be publicly listed on the Korea Exchange.

== History ==
The airline was established as a joint venture by Aekyung Group and the government of Jeju Province on 25 January 2005. It was established under a different Korean name (제주에어; a transliteration of "Jeju Air"). It received a business license on 25 August 2005, which made it the third major airline in the country after Korean Air and Asiana Airlines. On 20 September 2005, it changed its Korean name to its current form. It acquired its first aircraft on 2 May 2006, and had its first commercial flight on the Jeju-Gimpo route, on 5 June 2006. By the end of 2006, it had five aircraft. In addition to air service, the group is also the owner of a Holiday Inn Express in Seoul.

In 2016, it helped found Value Alliance, the world's first pan-regional low-cost carrier (LCC) alliance, comprising eight Asia Pacific LCCs. In 2017, Jeju Air carried over 6 million passengers, with revenue reported of $890mm US operating profits over $80mm US. In 2018, Jeju Air carried 7.3 million international passengers along with 4.7 million domestic passengers. Its domestic traffic has been relatively flat since 2016 as it has focused almost entirely on international expansion.

After an initial public offering in 2015, Jeju Air finances were stable until the coronavirus outbreak in early 2020. In November 2020, there were approximately 3,100 employees at the airline. In August 2021, Jeju Air sold stock, raising $180 million for financing operations; this was one of three occasions between 2020 and 2024 where it raised capital; the total was almost $500 million.

In 2024, in the National Customer Satisfaction Index (NCSI) organized by the Korea Productivity Headquarters, Jeju Air was ranked No. 1 in the LCC category for the third consecutive year.

== Destinations ==
Jeju Air offers scheduled domestic services, as well as international destinations including China, Japan, Oceania, and Southeast Asia.

Country	City	Airport	Notes	Refs
China	Beijing	Beijing Capital International Airport	Passenger	
China	Beijing	Beijing Daxing International Airport	Passenger	
China	Guilin	Guilin Liangjiang International Airport	Seasonal	
China	Harbin	Harbin Taiping International Airport	Passenger	
China	Jiamusi	Jiamusi Dongjiao Airport	Passenger	
China	Jinan	Jinan Yaoqiang International Airport	Passenger	
China	Nantong	Nantong Xingdong International Airport	Passenger	
China	Qingdao	Qingdao Jiaodong International Airport	Passenger	
China	Qingdao	Qingdao Liuting International Airport	Airport closed	
China	Quanzhou	Quanzhou Jinjiang International Airport	Terminated	
China	Shijiazhuang	Shijiazhuang Zhengding International Airport	Passenger	
China	Weihai	Weihai Dashuipo International Airport	Passenger	
China	Yanji	Yanji Chaoyangchuan International Airport	Passenger	
China	Yantai	Yantai Penglai International Airport	Passenger + cargo	
Guam	Hagåtña	Antonio B. Won Pat International Airport	Terminated	
Hong Kong	Hong Kong	Hong Kong International Airport	Passenger	
Indonesia	Batam	Hang Nadim International Airport	Passenger	
Indonesia	Denpasar	Ngurah Rai International Airport	Passenger	
Indonesia	Manado	Sam Ratulangi International Airport ^{Charter}	Terminated	
Japan	Fukuoka	Fukuoka Airport	Passenger	
Japan	Hakodate	Hakodate Airport	Passenger	
Japan	Hiroshima	Hiroshima Airport	Passenger	
Japan	Kagoshima	Kagoshima Airport	Passenger	
Japan	Kitakyushu	Kitakyushu Airport	Terminated	
Japan	Kobe	Kobe Airport	Passenger	
Japan	Matsuyama	Matsuyama Airport	Passenger	
Japan	Nagasaki	Nagasaki Airport	Passenger	
Japan	Nagoya	Chubu Centrair International Airport	Passenger	
Japan	Naha	Naha Airport	Passenger	
Japan	Oita	Oita Airport	Passenger	
Japan	Osaka	Kansai International Airport	Passenger	
Japan	Sapporo	New Chitose Airport	Passenger	
Japan	Shizuoka	Shizuoka Airport	Passenger	
Japan	Tokyo	Haneda Airport	Passenger	
Japan	Tokyo	Narita International Airport	Passenger + cargo	
Laos	Vientiane	Wattay International Airport	Passenger	
Macau	Macau	Macau International Airport	Passenger	
Malaysia	Kota Kinabalu	Kota Kinabalu International Airport	Passenger	
Mongolia	Ulaanbaatar	Chinggis Khaan International Airport	Passenger	
Northern Marianas	Saipan	Saipan International Airport	Passenger	
Philippines	Cebu	Mactan–Cebu International Airport	Passenger	
Philippines	Clark	Clark International Airport	Passenger	
Philippines	Manila	Ninoy Aquino International Airport	Passenger	
Philippines	Tagbilaran	Bohol–Panglao International Airport	Passenger	
Russia	Vladivostok	Vladivostok International Airport	Terminated	
Singapore	Singapore	Changi Airport	Passenger	
South Korea	Busan	Gimhae International Airport	Base	
South Korea	Cheongju	Cheongju International Airport	Passenger	
South Korea	Daegu	Daegu International Airport	Passenger	
South Korea	Gunsan	Gunsan Airport	Terminated	
South Korea	Gwangju	Gwangju Airport	Passenger	
South Korea	Jeju	Jeju International Airport	Base	
South Korea	Muan	Muan International Airport	Seasonal	
South Korea	Seoul	Gimpo International Airport	Base	
South Korea	Seoul	Incheon International Airport	Base	
South Korea	Yeosu	Yeosu Airport	Terminated	
Taiwan	Kaohsiung	Kaohsiung International Airport	Passenger	
Taiwan	Taipei	Taoyuan International Airport	Passenger	
Thailand	Bangkok	Suvarnabhumi Airport	Passenger	
Thailand	Chiang Mai	Chiang Mai International Airport	Passenger	
Vietnam	Da Lat	Lien Khuong Airport	Passenger	
Vietnam	Da Nang	Da Nang International Airport	Passenger	
Vietnam	Hanoi	Noi Bai International Airport	Passenger + cargo	
Vietnam	Ho Chi Minh City	Tan Son Nhat International Airport	Passenger	
Vietnam	Nha Trang	Cam Ranh International Airport	Passenger	
Vietnam	Phu Quoc	Phu Quoc International Airport	Passenger	

=== Codeshare agreements ===
Jeju Air maintains codeshare agreements with the following airlines:

- Jetstar
- Lion Air
- Scoot
- Singapore Airlines

=== Interline agreements ===
Jeju Air has interline agreements with the following airlines:

- Air Cambodia
- Air Canada
- Air Premia
- Bangkok Airways
- Etihad Airways

== Fleet ==
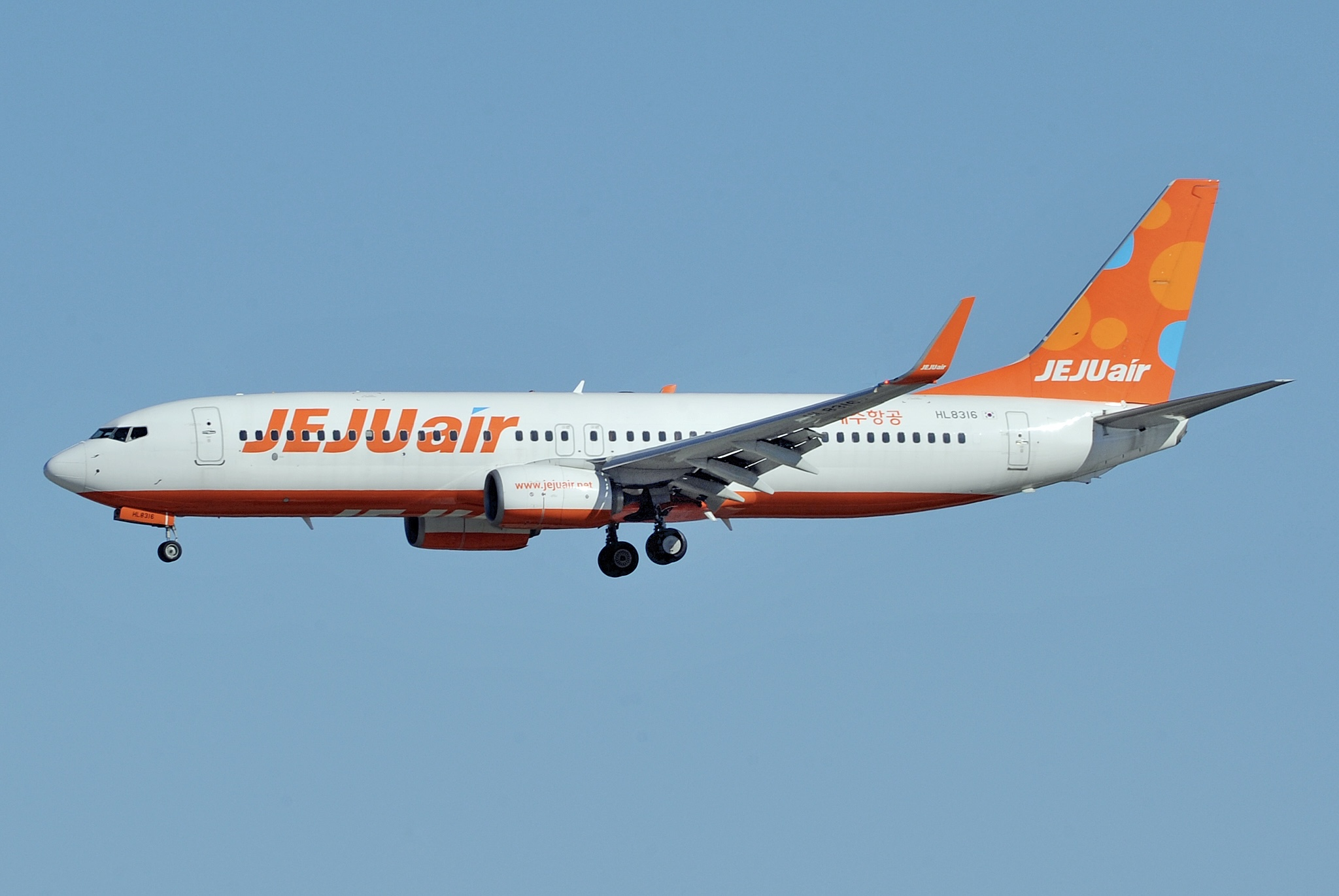
Jeju Air Boeing 737-800

=== Current fleet ===
As of October 2025, Jeju Air operates an all-Boeing 737 fleet composed of the following aircraft:

Jeju Air Boeing 737 MAX 8

Aircraft	In service	Orders	Configuration			Notes
Aircraft	In service	Orders	J	Y	Total	Notes
Boeing 737-800	35	—	12	162	174	To be retired and replaced by Boeing 737 MAX 8.
Boeing 737-800	35	—	—	189	189	To be retired and replaced by Boeing 737 MAX 8.
Boeing 737 MAX 8	8	32	—	189	189	To replace Boeing 737-800.
Jeju Air Cargo fleet
Boeing 737-800BCF	2	—	Cargo			
Total	45	32				

=== Historic fleet ===
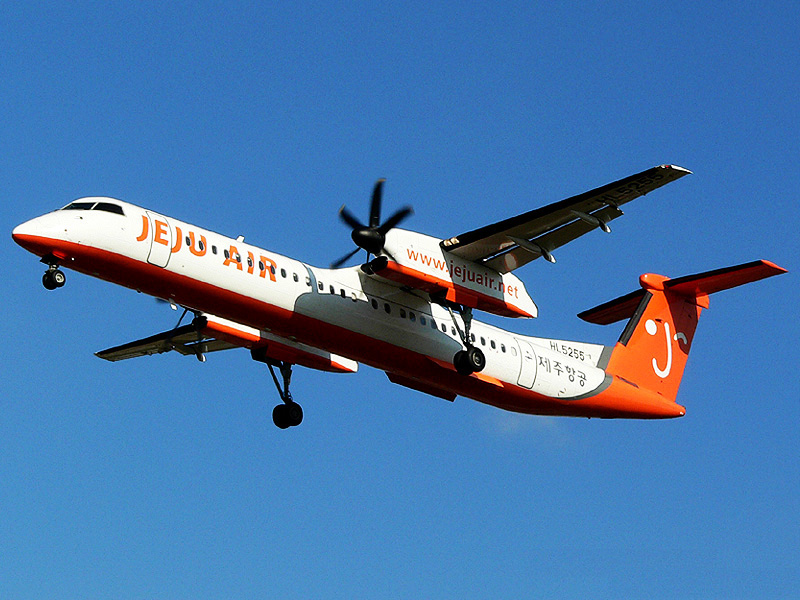
A former Jeju Air De Havilland Canada Dash 8-400 in 2007

Formerly, Jeju Air also operated the following aircraft types:

Jeju Air historic fleet
Aircraft	Total	Introduced	Retired	Notes/Refs
Boeing 737-800	15	2009	2025	
Boeing 737-800	1	2009	2024	Crashed as flight 7C2216.
De Havilland Canada Dash 8-400	5	2006	2010	

== Accidents and incidents ==
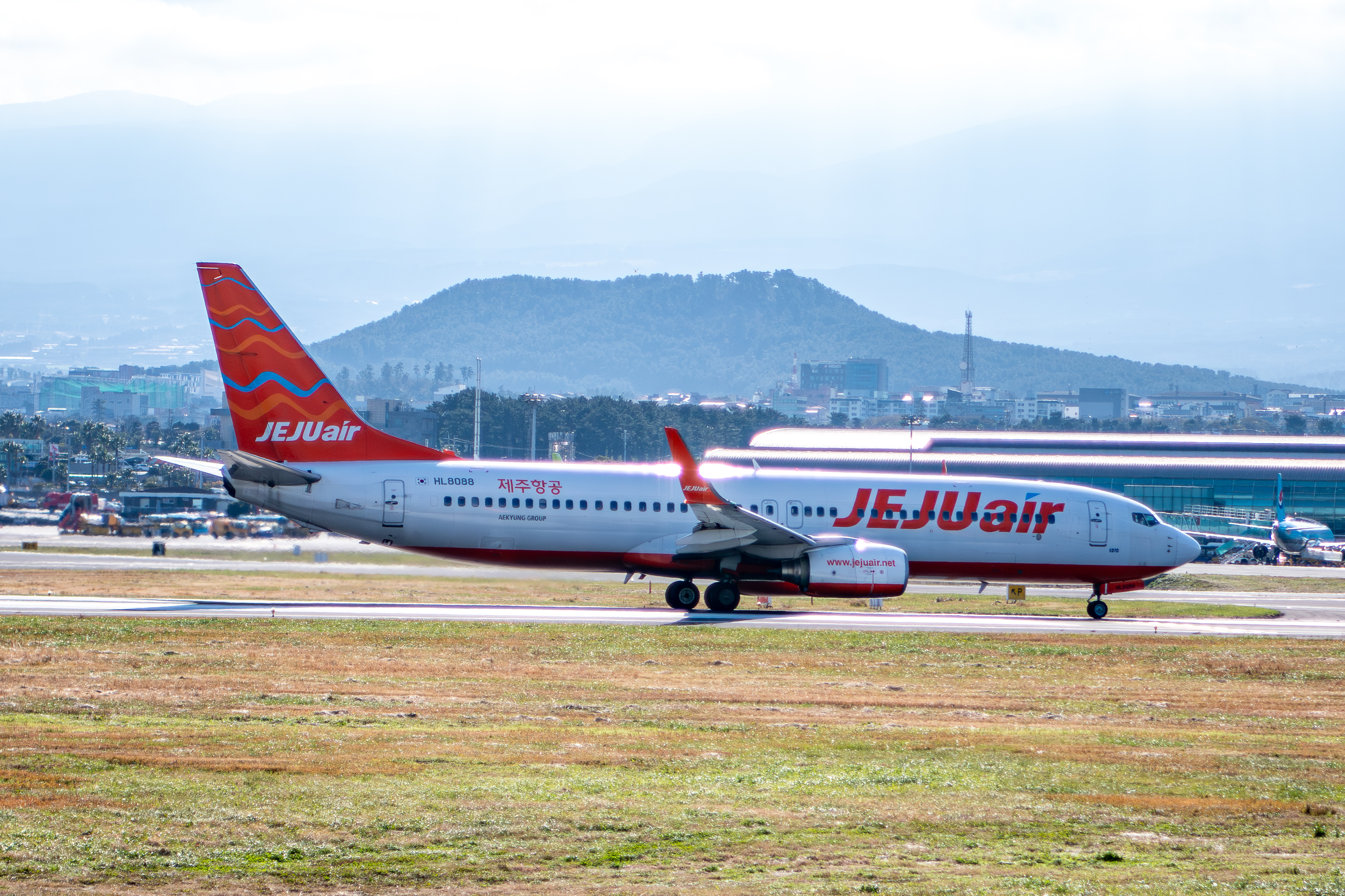
HL8088, the Boeing 737-800 that crashed under Flight 2216

- On 12 August 2007, Jeju Air Flight 502, a De Havilland Canada Dash 8-400 (registered as HL5256), overran the runway at Gimhae International Airport. All 74 passengers and five crew members survived, but four passengers were injured. The aircraft was substantially damaged and written off.
- In March 2022, the Ministry of Land, Infrastructure and Transport of Korea halted two flights of Jeju Air for 20 and 7 days, respectively, because they failed to follow the safety protocol.
- On 29 December 2024, Jeju Air Flight 2216, a Boeing 737-8AS (registered as HL8088) returning from Suvarnabhumi Airport in Bangkok, Thailand, experienced a runway excursion at 9:07AM KST (UTC +9) and crashed into an airport perimeter fence at Muan International Airport in Muan County, South Korea. The aircraft skidded down the runway on its belly before striking a reinforced concrete wall and exploding. Four crew members and all 175 passengers were killed, while two crew members survived and were taken to the hospital in Seoul. It has been assumed that the accident was due to a bird strike that caused a failure in the deployment of the landing gear, but the exact cause is still under investigation. This was the deadliest accident on South Korean soil, and the deadliest involving a Korean-registered aircraft since 1997. Jeju Air's CEO pledged to repair trust and strengthen safety measures in a press conference following the incident.
