= Muan International Airport =

Dormant commercial airport in South Jeolla, South Korea

Coordinates: 34°59′29″N 126°22′58″E

Muan International Airport 무안국제공항
- IATA: MWX; ICAO: RKJB

Summary
- Airport type: Public
- Owner: Ministry of Land, Infrastructure and Transport
- Operator: Korea Airports Corporation
- Serves: Jeonnam-Gwangju
- Location: Muan County
- Opened: 8 November 2007; 19 years ago
- Passenger services ceased: 29 December 2024 following the crash of Jeju Air Flight 2216
- Elevation AMSL: 52 ft (16 m)
- Website: airport.co.kr/muaneng

Map
- Location in Jeonnam-Gwangju Location in South Korea

Runways
Direction	Length		Surface
Direction	m	ft	Surface
01/19	2,800	9,186	Concrete

Statistics (2023)
- Passengers: 233,337
- Aircraft movements: 1,484
- Cargo tonnage: 1,484
- Source:airport.kr.com

- Muan International Airport
- Hangul: 무안국제공항
- Hanja: 務安國際空港
- RR: Muan gukjegonghang
- MR: Muan kukchegonghang

Muan International Airport (IATA: MWX, ICAO: RKJB) is a dormant international airport in Muan County, Jeonnam-Gwangju, South Korea. The airport serves the former province of South Jeolla and the former city of Gwangju. It replaced the nearby Mokpo Airport, and is expected to replace the nearby Gwangju Airport as well. The airport is managed by Korea Airports Corporation and served 543,247 passengers in 2018.

This airport is planned to be reopened in late 2027 and renamed Kim Dae-jung International Airport after the eighth president of South Korea, Kim Dae-jung.

== History ==
Construction of Muan International Airport began in 1997, and it opened on 9 November 2007, subsequently replacing Mokpo Airport, which is now a dedicated military air base.

The airport closed following the crash of Jeju Air Flight 2216, and remains as such as of November 2026. Emergency and training flights resumed at the airport on 24 February 2025. In September 2026, it was reported that the airport will remain closed until late 2027 due to runway pavement repairs, changes to the instrument landing system localizer as a result of the crash, and relocation of domestic flights from Gwangju Airport.

== Airlines and destinations at the time of airport closure ==
Airlines	Destinations
Cambodia Airways	Siem Reap
Jeju Air	Jeju, Kota Kinabalu, Nagasaki, Taipei–Taoyuan
Jin Air	Jeju, Osaka–Kansai, Taipei–Taoyuan, Tokyo–Narita, Ulaanbaatar
Lao Airlines	Charter: Luang Prabang
VietJet Air	Da Nang

== Statistics ==
Air traffic statistics
	Aircraft operations	Passenger volume	Cargo tonnage
2007	224	15,223	159
2008	1,841	130,014	1,173
2009	1,032	57,716	450
2010	1,058	47,727	907
2011	875	91,133	941
2012	923	96,166	957
2013	1,237	132,603	1,329
2014	1,499	178,414	1,738
2015	2,355	311,922	2,677
2016	2,330	321,675	2,751
2017	2,146	298,016	2,243
2018	3,818	543,247	3,890
2019	6,585	895,410	6,762
2020	930	112,938	1,013
2021	88	7,529	35
2022	192	29,394	352
2023	1,484	233,337	2,724
Source: Korea Airports Corporation Traffic Statistics

== Accidents and incidents ==
On 29 December 2024, Jeju Air Flight 2216, a Boeing 737-800 (registered HL8088), crashed during an emergency belly landing at Muan International Airport. The aircraft skidded along the runway before striking a concrete embankment at the runway's end, igniting a fire. Of the 181 people on board, 179 were confirmed dead. The two survivors, both flight attendants aged 25 and 33, were rescued from the rear of the aircraft, both were severely injured but conscious at the time. The concrete embankment at the end of the runway, part of the localizer antenna system, was heavily criticized for its design and placement. It was struck by the aircraft after it overran the runway, contributing to the explosion and subsequent fire that resulted in significant fatalities. Investigations are ongoing to determine the role of the embankment in the crash, alongside other factors such as the bird strike and landing gear malfunction.

== See also ==
- Transportation in South Korea
