= List of busiest passenger flight routes in the 2010s =

These are lists of the busiest flight routes by the number of passengers flown, by seat capacity and by aircraft movements in the 2010s. For recent data, see List of busiest passenger flight routes.

== Global statistics ==
=== By available seats ===
The following are the lists of the world's busiest flight routes based on the number of seats available in the flights scheduled in both directions. Note that these statistics do not consider the number of passengers actually carried (load factor).

Top 10 most capacitated flight routes
Rank	Departing	Arriving	Distance (km)	2019	2017	2016	2015
1	Jeju	Seoul–Gimpo	449	17,426,873	5,365,761	6,561,314	7,000,000
2	Sapporo–Chitose	Tokyo–Haneda	835	12,498,468		6,209,366	6,300,000
3	Fukuoka	Tokyo–Haneda	889	11,400,018		5,961,277	5,800,000
4	Hanoi	Ho Chi Minh City	1171	10,253,530		5,067,167	3,400,000
5	Sydney	Melbourne	705	9,958,500		4,141,322	5,100,000
6	Jeddah	Riyadh	857	8,018,205			
7	Tokyo–Haneda	Naha	1573	7,704,098		3,784,546	3,900,000
8	Mumbai	Delhi	1150	8,230,822		4,143,639	3,900,000
9	Beijing–Capital	Shanghai–Hongqiao	1081	8,117,461		3,962,081	3,900,000
10	Tokyo–Haneda	Osaka–Itami	407				3,600,000

=== By number of passengers ===
Top 100 busiest flight routes
Airport 1	Airport 2	Distance (km)	2018	2017
Jeju	Seoul–Gimpo	449	14,107,414	13,460,306
Tokyo–Haneda	Sapporo	835	9,698,639	8,726,502
Sydney	Melbourne	705	9,245,392	9,090,941
Tokyo–Haneda	Fukuoka	889	8,762,547	7,864,000
Mumbai	Delhi	1150	7,392,155	7,129,943
Hanoi	Ho Chi Minh City	1171	6,867,114	6,769,823
Beijing–Capital	Shanghai–Hongqiao	1081	6,518,997	6,833,684
Hong Kong	Taipei–Taoyuan	802	6,476,268	6,719,030
Tokyo–Haneda	Naha	1573	5,829,712	5,269,481
Jakarta	Surabaya	700	5,649,046	5,271,304
Jakarta	Denpasar	991	5,535,108	4,952,852
Jeddah	Riyadh	857	5,526,110	5,091,629
Tokyo–Haneda	Osaka–Itami	407	5,131,757	5,106,584
Chengdu	Beijing–Capital	1559	5,092,442	4,951,620
Guangzhou	Beijing–Capital	1898	5,076,229	4,864,177
Cancún	Mexico City	1294	4,885,602	4,656,308
Beijing–Capital	Shenzhen	1979	4,853,038	4,496,351
Brisbane	Sydney	756	4,815,609	4,742,771
Jakarta	Singapore	896	4,812,342	4,810,602
Guangzhou	Shanghai–Hongqiao	1176	4,724,514	4,469,990
Shanghai–Hongqiao	Shenzhen	1217	4,679,294	4,445,654
Bengaluru	Delhi	1717	4,542,638	4,183,799
Jakarta	Makassar	1439	4,530,428	4,559,737
Jakarta	Medan	1401	4,512,830	3,886,963
Cape Town	Johannesburg	1292	4,508,214	4,698,849
Kuala Lumpur	Singapore	296	4,290,463	4,108,824
São Paulo–Congonhas	Rio de Janeiro-Santos Dumont	378	4,234,631	4,096,193
Hong Kong	Shanghai–Pudong	1247	4,053,909	4,162,347
New York–JFK	Los Angeles	3982	3,971,922	3,531,613
Bogotá	Medellín-Rionegro	239	3,930,332	3,323,127
Bengaluru	Mumbai	834	3,814,494	3,445,315
Los Angeles	San Francisco	541	3,635,655	3,507,702
Bangkok–Suvarnabhumi	Phuket	685	3,612,373	3,396,189
Brisbane	Melbourne	1379	3,565,266	3,545,156
Cebu	Manila	570	3,519,525	3,233,871
Hong Kong	Bangkok–Suvarnabhumi	1694	3,490,988	3,438,628
Mexico City	Monterrey	729	3,474,971	3,202,091
Kolkata	Delhi	1333	3,431,999	3,153,548
Da Nang	Ho Chi Minh City	617	3,256,718	3,210,368
Chiang Mai	Bangkok–Don Mueang	569	3,212,124	3,155,528
Seoul–Incheon	Osaka–Kansai	872	3,210,813	2,907,199
Cusco	Lima	583	3,201,414	3,000,513
New York–LaGuardia	Chicago–O'Hare	1177	3,198,700	3,118,651
Jakarta	Kuala Lumpur	1142	3,170,193	2,812,479
Mexico City	Guadalajara	466	3,170,177	2,996,806
Jeju	Busan	294	3,106,224	2,793,383
İzmir	Istanbul–Atatürk	348	3,084,250	3,496,438
Hong Kong	Seoul–Incheon	2080	3,081,942	3,198,132
Guangzhou	Chengdu	1232	3,044,038	2,944,642
Hong Kong	Manila	1145	3,008,842	2,907,228
Hong Kong	Beijing–Capital	2011	3,000,786	2,962,707
Delhi	Hyderabad	1273	2,980,730	2,577,743
Las Vegas	Los Angeles	388	2,961,553	2,823,411
Durban	Johannesburg	498	2,953,851	2,847,156
Hong Kong	Singapore	2587	2,923,578	3,147,384
Atlanta	Orlando	645	2,918,980	2,836,474
Vancouver	Toronto–Pearson	3358	2,912,026	2,950,823
Chengdu	Shenzhen	1327	2,873,291	2,509,192
Hangzhou	Beijing–Capital	1157	2,856,019	2,883,519
Tokyo–Narita	Taipei–Taoyuan	2193	2,848,925	2,592,049
New York–-JFK	London–Heathrow	5562	2,864,321	2,972,817
Bogotá	Cartagena	673	2,825,672	2,573,763
Da Nang	Hanoi	626	2,810,618	2,534,425
Los Angeles	Chicago–O'Hare	2811	2,810,368	2,927,492
İzmir	Istanbul–Sabiha Gökçen	364	2,799,413	2,608,469
Kota Kinabalu	Kuala Lumpur	1622	2,790,835	2,609,151
Delhi	Pune	1158	2,787,960	2,601,764
Delhi	Chennai	1774	2,777,822	2,456,556
Tokyo–Haneda	Kagoshima	948	2,768,091	2,553,366
Jakarta	Palembang	413	2,746,929	
Bogotá	Cali	287	2,722,122	2,726,627
Gold Coast	Sydney	682	2,722,095	2,739,057
Bangkok–Suvarnabhumi	Chiang Mai	597	2,694,612	2,395,389
Dubai	London–Heathrow	5529	2,665,441	3,210,121
Jakarta	Semarang	422	2,650,823	
Beijing–Capital	Xi'an	951	2,639,625	2,540,100
Davao	Manila	975	2,630,909	2,606,945
Bangkok–Suvarnabhumi	Singapore	1431	2,597,199	2,596,349
Guangzhou	Hangzhou	1037	2,594,232	2,653,701
Atlanta	Fort Lauderdale	943	2,572,815	2,360,786
Beijing–Capital	Chongqing	1483	2,554,282	2,485,613
Antalya	Istanbul–Sabiha Gökçen	462	2,545,643	
Jakarta	Yogyakarta	455	2,517,527	
Bangkok–Don Mueang	Hat Yai	794	2,513,414	2,518,553
Jinghong	Kunming–Changshui	386	2,502,690	2,627,969
Adelaide	Melbourne	641	2,493,589	2,454,637
Mumbai	Goa	423	2,492,268	2,537,413
Kuala Lumpur	Penang	324	2,489,660	2,379,127
Los Angeles	Seattle–Tacoma	1537	2,485,576	2,768,035
Montréal	Toronto–Pearson	503	2,485,533	2,640,849
Auckland	Wellington	480	2,481,522	2,617,041
Tokyo–Narita	Seoul–Incheon	1257	2,466,953	
Bengaluru	Hyderabad	454	2,466,522	
Jakarta	Pontianak	731	2,463,262	
Madrid	Barcelona	483	2,448,664	
Chongqing	Shenzhen	1062	2,428,313	
Mumbai	Dubai	1925	2,394,060	2,383,145
Auckland	Christchurch	751	2,385,766	2,535,669
Atlanta	New York–LaGuardia	1238	2,378,490	2,387,693
Ahmedabad	Delhi	752	2,363,818	
Bangkok–Don Mueang	Phuket	698		3,325,261
Osaka–Kansai	Taipei–Taoyuan	1714		2,530,208
Denver	Los Angeles	1392		2,519,541
Guangzhou	Chongqing	975		2,468,368
Surabaya	Makassar	794		2,434,487
Dubai	Kuwait City	857		2,394,192
Ankara	Istanbul–Sabiha Gökçen	322		2,378,692
Mumbai	Chennai	1045		2,377,806
Jakarta	Padang	914		2,350,206
Kuching	Kuala Lumpur	971		2,341,291

Busiest international flight routes by origin-and-destination passenger volume (airport pairs)
Airports		2018	2017	2015
Hong Kong	Taipei-Taoyuan	6,476,268	6,719,030 (#8)	5,100,000
Jakarta	Singapore	4,812,342	4,810,602	3,400,000
Kuala Lumpur	Singapore	4,490,463	4,108,824	2,700,000
Bangkok-Suvarnabhumi	Hong Kong	3,490,988	3,438,628	3,000,000
Seoul-Incheon	Osaka-Kansai	3,210,813	2,907,199	
Jakarta	Kuala Lumpur	3,170,193	2,812,479	
Hong Kong	Seoul-Incheon	3,081,942	3,198,132	
Hong Kong	Manila	3,008,842	2,907,228	
Hong Kong	Singapore	2,923,578	3,147,384	2,700,000
Tokyo-Narita	Taipei-Taoyuan	2,848,925		
New York–JFK	London–Heathrow		2,972,817	

=== By aircraft movements ===
Total international flights
Rank	Airport pair		March 2018 – Feb 2019	Airlines (2018)
1	Kuala Lumpur (KUL)	Singapore (SIN)	30,187	Malaysia Airlines, Singapore Airlines, AirAsia, Jetstar Asia, Malindo Air, Scoot, Firefly, Saudia
2	Hong Kong (HKG)	Taipei (TPE)	28,447	Cathay Pacific, China Airlines, EVA Airlines, Hong Kong Airlines, Thai Airways, Starlux Airlines, Greater Bay Airlines, United Parcel Service
3	Jakarta (CGK)	Singapore (SIN)	27,046	Singapore Airlines, Garuda Indonesia, Lion Air, Jetstar Asia, Indonesia AirAsia, Scoot, Batik Air
4	Hong Kong (HKG)	Shanghai (PVG)	20,678	China Eastern Airlines, Hong Kong Airlines, Cathay Pacific, Spring Airlines, Juneyao Airlines
5	Jakarta (CGK)	Kuala Lumpur (KUL)	19,741	Malaysia Airlines, AirAsia, Lion Air, Indonesia AirAsia, Malindo Airways, Garuda Indonesia, KLM, Batik Air, Citilink, TransNusa
6	Osaka (KIX)	Seoul (ICN)	19,711	Asiana Airlines, Korean Air, Jin Air, Jeju Air, Peach Aviation, Eastar Jet, T'way Air, Air Seoul, Air Busan
7	Toronto (YYZ)	New York (LGA)	17,038	Air Canada, United Airlines, Republic Airways, AirSprint, Jazz Aviation, Endeavor Air, NetJets, Delta Air Lines
8	Hong Kong (HKG)	Seoul (ICN)	15,770	Cathay Pacific, Korean Air, HK Express, Asiana Airlines, Jeju Air, Eastar Jet, T'way Air, Jin Air, Thai Airways, Greater Bay Airlines
9	Bangkok (BKK)	Singapore (SIN)	14,698	Singapore Airlines, Thai Airways, Scoot, Jetstar Asia, Cathay Pacific, K-Mile Air, Nippon Cargo Airlines, Asiana Airlines
10	Dubai (DXB)	Kuwait (KWI)	14,581	Emirates, Flydubai, Kuwait Airways, Jazeera Airways
11	Hong Kong (HKG)	Bangkok (BKK)	14,556	Cathay Pacific, Thai Airways, Hong Kong Airlines, Emirates, HK Express, Greater Bay Airlines, Ethiopian Airlines, Air Hong Kong, Egypt Air, K-Mile Air, Hong Kong Air Cargo, Qatar Airways Cargo, Air ACT
12	Hong Kong (HKG)	Beijing (PEK)	14,537	Air China, Hong Kong Airlines, Cathay Pacific, Air Hong Kong
13	London (LHR)	New York–JFK	14,195	British Airways, Virgin Atlantic, American Airlines, Delta Air Lines, JetBlue Airways
14	Tokyo (NRT)	Taipei (TPE)	13,902	China Airlines, EVA Air, Peach Aviation, Japan Airlines, Scoot, Cathay Pacific, Jetstar Japan, Thai Lion Air, Tiger Air, Starlux, Nippon Cargo Airlines, FedEx Express
15	London (LHR)	Dublin (DUB)	13,855	Aer Lingus, British Airways
16	Osaka (KIX)	Shanghai (PVG)	13,708	China Eastern Airlines, China Southern Airlines, Air China, Juneyao Airlines, All Nippon Airways, Spring Airlines, China Cargo Airlines, Peach Aviation, Shanghai Airlines
17	Hong Kong (HKG)	Singapore (SIN)	13,654	Cathay Pacific, Singapore Airlines, Scoot, Air Hong Kong, Hong Kong Air Cargo, UPS Airlines
18	Toronto (YYZ)	Chicago (ORD)	13,503	Air Canada, United Airlines, Envoy Air, EVA Air, SkyWest, AeroLogic, Republic Airways
19	Tokyo (NRT)	Seoul (ICN)	13,420	Asiana Airlines, Korean Air, Jeju Air, Eastar Jet, Jin Air, T'way Air, Air Japan, Zip Air, Air Premia, Air Seoul, Air Busan, Ethiopian Airlines, Japan Airline, All Nippon Airways, Kalitta Air, Aero K, Lufthansa Cargo
20	Osaka (KIX)	Taipei (TPE)	13,325	All Nippon Airways, China Airlines, EVA Air, Japan Airlines, Starlux Airlines, Tigerair Taiwan

== Regional statistics ==
=== Europe ===
Busiest flight routes inside the EU, UK, Switzerland, Iceland and Norway. Figures are only available for EU countries, Switzerland, Iceland and Norway. Passengers of domestic routes in countries is fewer than 1 million, except for Russia, Ukraine, and Turkey, based on airport statistics among other European countries (excluding EU members, Switzerland, Iceland, and Norway). The St. Petersburg Pulkovo Airport – Moscow (three airports) route was used by 2,965,331 passengers in 2013.

Data retrieved from Eurostat, 2011–2019
Rank	Airport 1	Airport 2	2019	2018	2017	2016	2015	2014	2013	2012	2011
1	Madrid/Barajas	Barcelona/El Prat (Note: Madrid – Barcelona had 4,627,000 passengers in 2007, meaning a reduction by 34% in 2010, partly because of a new high-speed railway. The decline has continued from 560 weekly flights in 2010 to 380 in 2012.)	2,572,893	2,466,968	2,341,255	2,328,726	2,253,387	2,204,765	2,213,200	2,550,462	3,102,436
2	Frankfurt	Berlin/Tegel	2,249,667	2,292,098	1,956,128	1,935,465	1,907,218	1,792,006	1,845,600	1,813,063	1,792,655
3	Toulouse/Blagnac	Paris/Orly	2,217,892	2,282,407	2,325,043	2,358,917	2,318,015	2,330,949	2,379,100	2,330,224	2,322,456
4	Barcelona/El Prat	Palma de Mallorca	2,173,939	2,035,602	1,944,554	1,772,613	1,576,063	1,410,172	1,388,900	1,460,684	1,639,423
5	Oslo/Gardermoen	Trondheim	2,106,440	2,151,448	2,089,889	1,988,105	1,942,959	1,912,141	1,873,944	1,818,877	1,749,545
6	Nice	Paris/Orly	2,052,649	2,135,634	2,217,895	2,124,792	2,113,506	2,072,138	2,160,300	2,175,773	2,236,436
7	Oslo/Gardermoen	Bergen	2,003,406	2,028,680	1,985,088	1,881,960	1,810,826	1,819,279	1,722,398	1,729,076	1,691,887
8	Madrid/Barajas	Palma de Mallorca	1,995,104	1,967,136	1,815,387	1,687,547	1,411,314	1,283,404	1,224,700	1,442,410	1,604,853
9	Berlin/Tegel	Munich	1,933,817	1,988,248	1,973,008	1,939,820	1,974,929	1,868,877	1,831,700	1,731,145	1,667,408
10	London/Heathrow	Dublin	1,855,333	1,809,140	1,803,479	1,751,689	1,682,855	1,650,394	1,663,900	1,577,649	1,556,111
11	Catania/Fontanarossa	Rome/Fiumicino	1,824,428	1,976,230	2,017,172	2,054,721	1,979,648	1,869,881	1,566,800	1,694,400	1,842,940
12	Amsterdam/Schiphol	London/Heathrow	1,747,789	1,746,940	1,689,924	1,617,170	1,587,605	1,486,783	1,443,400	1,429,800	1,406,964
13	Munich	Hamburg	1,739,939	1,749,616	1,739,252	1,805,211	1,811,425	1,756,990	1,713,200	1,719,351	1,717,734
14	Oslo/Gardermoen	Stavanger	1,681,335	1,675,486	1,600,959	1,564,127	1,515,870	1,564,631	1,536,032	1,517,195	1,434,043
15	Madrid/Barajas	Gran Canaria	1,659,106	1,616,540	1,510,429	1,508,972	1,305,670	1,181,442	1,152,669	1,301,539	1,438,377
16	London/Gatwick	Barcelona/El Prat	1,586,967	1,556,045	1,460,378	1,362,488	1,354,193	1,273,850	1,131,350	741,735	517,820
17	Rome/Fiumicino	Palermo/Falcone Borsellino	1,579,946	1,663,463	1,589,733	1,543,462	1,481,174	1,475,957	1,264,100	1,360,400	1,499,933
18	Madrid/Barajas	Lisbon	1,557,398	1,517,620	1,427,929	1,299,412	1,174,116	1,026,786	975,389	1,108,931	1,169,714
19	London/Heathrow	Frankfurt	1,548,995	1,552,249	1,495,472	1,486,291	1,530,986	1,506,826	1,488,600	1,482,649	1,459,909
20	Palma de Mallorca	Düsseldorf	1,544,710	1,495,826	1,267,676	1,268,891	1,201,664	1,162,268	1,090,227	985,749	944,437
21	Madrid/Barajas	Tenerife North	1,493,755	1,487,326	1,380,916	1,305,110	1,149,450	1,094,815	1,102,701	1,167,731	1,337,050
22	Munich	Düsseldorf	1,488,322	1,422,773	1,554,184	1,565,997	1,557,442	1,527,416	1,558,200	1,553,361	1,569,364
23	Copenhagen	Oslo/Gardermoen	1,479,320	1,509,030	1,544,534	1,506,326	1,427,618	1,402,753	1,322,948	1,291,018	1,206,480
24	London/Heathrow	Madrid/Barajas	1,476,551	1,416,795	1,382,290	1,317,511	1,320,834	1,274,714	1,264,800	1,197,700	1,093,400
25	Frankfurt	Hamburg	1,426,073	1,440,312	1,395,408	1,372,185	1,361,027	1,343,857	1,362,400	1,385,867	1,587,593
26	Barcelona/El Prat	Rome/Fiumicino	1,402,757	1,332,401	1,225,834	1,315,868	1,184,506				
27	Stockholm/Arlanda	Copenhagen	1,387,544	1,520,873	1,520,287	1,553,276	1,461,166	1,444,429	1,325,700	1,269,200	1,166,000
28	Barcelona/El Prat	Amsterdam/Schiphol	1,384,848	1,420,246	1,363,626	1,307,902	1,204,814	1,217,977	1,186,808	1,250,126	1,321,528
29	Stockholm/Arlanda	Oslo/Gardermoen	1,379,312	1,453,105	1,406,211	1,387,885	1,338,163	1,354,730	1,204,351	1,187,164	1,153,232
30	Barcelona/El Prat	Paris/CDG	1,373,128	1,279,331							

Busiest flight routes between an airport in Europe (i.e. EU, UK, Switzerland, Iceland, and Norway) and outside Europe, Eurostat
Rank	Airport 1	Airport 2	2019	2018	2017	2016	2015	2014	2012	2010
1	London/Heathrow	New York/John F Kennedy	3,192,195	3,035,228	2,946,329	2,960,268	3,078,693	3,002,024	2,881,390	2,551,276
2	London/Heathrow	Dubai/Intl	2,333,127	2,732,638	3,238,308	3,038,958	2,862,852	2,838,717	2,067,227	1,974,098
3	Paris/CDG	New York/John F Kennedy	1,636,491	1,580,664	1,554,793	1,424,611	1,501,416	1,367,882	1,422,259	1,190,914
4	London/Heathrow	Hong Kong/Chek Lap Kok	1,612,530	1,572,021	1,588,805	1,574,741	1,584,486	1,608,980	1,638,834	1,801,520
5	London/Heathrow	Los Angeles/Intl	1,602,892	1,675,577	1,618,153	1,565,992	1,645,002	1,481,023	1,428,040	1,419,144
6	London/Heathrow	Singapore/Changi	1,526,639	1,590,704	1,351,980	1,314,976	1,268,407	1,247,017	1,745,186	1,507,032
7	Paris/Orly	Guadeloupe/Pointe-à-Pitre	1,429,730	1,299,570	1,227,553	1,214,916	1,166,850	1,135,945	1,077,254	1,098,322
8	London/Heathrow	Doha/Hamad	1,264,687	1,181,345	1,287,225	1,184,994	1,040,315	653,724		
9	London/Heathrow	Chicago/O'Hare	1,250,426	1,158,537	1,062,695	1,073,522	1,060,332	1,161,250	1,188,326	1,138,579
10	Paris/CDG	Montreal/Pierre Elliott Trudeau	1,247,300	1,185,183	1,183,504	1,148,800	1,147,598	1,107,738	1,092,084	1,158,381

For routes from the EU, UK, Switzerland, Iceland and Norway to other countries inside Europe except to Turkey, the busiest was in 2019 Paris/CDG – Moscow/Sheremetyevo with 830,980.

Busiest flight routes in or from Europe by city pairs by passengers, Eurostat
Rank	City 1	City 2	2019	2016
1	London	Dublin	5,106,040	4,771,614
2	Moscow	Saint Petersburg	5,051,518	3,836,588
3	London	Amsterdam	4,920,551	4,344,935
4	London	New York City	4,869,777	4,243,687
5	London	Dubai	3,630,407	3,960,389
6	London	Barcelona	3,490,189	3,125,080
7	London	Edinburgh	3,373,092	3,393,013
8	Paris	Toulouse	3,218,040	3,260,074
9	Paris	Nice	3,184,661	2,975,405
10	London	Madrid	3,142,916	

Notes:

- London includes City, Gatwick, Heathrow, Luton, Stansted and Southend airports.
- New York includes Kennedy and Newark airports
- Paris includes Charles de Gaulle (CDG) and Orly airports.
- Barcelona includes El Prat and Girona airports.
- Berlin includes Schönefeld (from 2020 Brandenburg) and Tegel airports.
- Moscow includes Domodedovo, Sheremetyevo and Vnukovo airports.
- Turkey is not included even if Istanbul – Izmir has (as of 2019) more passengers than London – Dublin, because all its domestic routes are mostly or entirely inside Asia.

== National statistics ==
=== Argentina ===
Busiest international flight routes in Argentina by passengers:
Rank	Airport 1	Airport 2	2017
1	Buenos Aires	Santiago de Chile	2,027,000
2	Buenos Aires	São Paulo	1,903,000
3	Buenos Aires	Miami	1,001,000
4	Buenos Aires	Rio de Janeiro	938,000
5	Buenos Aires	Lima	896,000
6	Buenos Aires	Madrid	815,000
7	Mendoza	Santiago de Chile	425,000
8	Buenos Aires	Bogotá	372,000
9	Buenos Aires	Rome	332,000
10	Buenos Aires	New York City	329,000

Busiest domestic flight routes in Argentina:
Rank	Airport 1	Airport 2	2017
1	Buenos Aires	Córdoba	1,368,000
2	Buenos Aires – Aeroparque	Bariloche	1,005,000
3	Buenos Aires – Aeroparque	Mendoza	880,000
4	Buenos Aires – Aeroparque	Iguazú	841,000
5	Buenos Aires – Aeroparque	Salta	828,000
6	Buenos Aires – Aeroparque	Neuquén	722,000
7	Buenos Aires – Aeroparque	Tucumán	501,000
8	Buenos Aires – Aeroparque	Ushuaia	490,000
9	Buenos Aires – Aeroparque	Comodoro Rivadavia	462,000
10	Buenos Aires – Aeroparque	El Calafate	383,000

=== Australia ===
Busiest domestic flight routes in Australia. By all passengers and including connecting:
Rank	Airport 1	Airport 2	2019
1	Melbourne	Sydney	9,181,932
2	Brisbane	Sydney	4,820,704
3	Brisbane	Melbourne	3,608,479
4	Gold Coast	Sydney	2,733,449
5	Adelaide	Melbourne	2,538,061
6	Gold Coast	Melbourne	2,122,157
7	Melbourne	Perth	2,110,125
8	Adelaide	Sydney	1,878,741
9	Perth	Sydney	1,692,031
10	Melbourne	Hobart	1,670,181

Busiest international flight routes in Australia. By all passengers and including connecting:
Rank	Australian airport	Overseas airport	2019
1	Melbourne	Singapore	1,629,492
2	Sydney	Auckland	1,602,232
3	Sydney	Singapore	1,537,148
4	Melbourne	Auckland	1,251,457
5	Sydney	Hong Kong	1,195,224
6	Perth	Singapore	1,131,233
7	Brisbane	Singapore	964,447
8	Brisbane	Auckland	955,385
9	Sydney	Los Angeles	908,540
10	Perth	Denpasar	893,420

=== Colombia ===
Busiest domestic flight routes in Colombia by passengers:
Rank	Airport 1	Airport 2	2017
1	Bogotá	Medellín	3,013,297
2	Bogotá	Cartagena	2,433,483
3	Bogotá	Cali	2,083,833
4	Bogotá	Barranquilla	1,435,766
5	Bogotá	Santa Marta	1,151,101
6	Bogotá	Archipelago of San Andrés, Providencia and Santa Catalina	951,880
7	Bogotá	Bucaramanga	942,793
8	Bogotá	Pereira	849,118
9	Cartagena	Medellín	738,699
10	Bogotá	Montería	568,500

Busiest international flight routes in Colombia by passengers:
Rank	Airport 1	Airport 2	2017
1	Bogotá	Panama City	698,916
2	Bogotá	Mexico City	533,444
3	Bogotá	Lima	470,514
4	Bogotá	Miami	469,899
5	Bogotá	Madrid	447,470
6	Bogotá	Quito	391,586
7	Bogotá	Santiago de Chile	366,904
8	Medellín	Panama City	366,630
9	Bogotá	Buenos Aires	333,481
10	Bogotá	Cancún	306,905

=== India ===
Busiest international flight routes from/to Indian cities by passengers
Rank	City pair		2019
1	Mumbai	Dubai	2,378,916
2	Delhi	Dubai	1,966,260
3	Delhi	Bangkok	1,093,580
4	Hyderabad	Dubai	1,068,343
5	Kochi	Dubai	1,037,314
6	Chennai	Dubai	1,017,254
7	Chennai	Colombo	940,521
8	Bengaluru	Dubai	865,088
9	Chennai	Singapore	855,420
10	Delhi	London	850,170
11	Mumbai	Singapore	824,590
12	Delhi	Kathmandu	767,262
13	Mumbai	Abu Dhabi	751,112
14	Delhi	Singapore	750,562
15	Delhi	Hong Kong	743,817

=== Mexico ===
Busiest domestic flight routes in Mexico by passengers
Rank	Airport 1	Airport 2	2019	2018
1	Mexico City	Cancún	5,009,235	4,990,647
2	Monterrey	Mexico City	3,601,937	3,452,421
3	Mexico City	Guadalajara	3,386,521	3,167,438
4	Tijuana	Mexico City	2,151,343	1,964,460
5	Tijuana	Guadalajara	1,748,213	1,783,149
6	Mexico City	Mérida	1,851,414	1,686,256
7	Monterrey	Cancún	1,386,056	1,282,777
8	Puerto Vallarta	Mexico City	1,094,694	956,419
9	Guadalajara	Cancún	885,881	947,599
10	San José del Cabo	Mexico City	971,016	844,785

Busiest international flight routes from/to Mexico by passengers
Rank	Airport 1	Airport 2	2019	2018
1	Cancún	Dallas/Fort Worth	840,800	779,235
2	Cancún	Houston/Intercontinental	856,952	868,115
3	Guadalajara	Los Angeles	994,822	993,213
4	Mexico City	Madrid	880,988	779,777
5	Cancún	Chicago/O'Hare	763,830	809,898
6	Mexico City	Bogotá	866,896	849,590
7	Mexico City	Los Angeles	1,044,786	1,236,168
8	Mexico City	Houston/Intercontinental	831,729	1,049,838
9	Cancún	Atlanta	706,409	721,936
10	Cancún	Toronto-Pearson	822,744	801,544

=== Turkey ===
Busiest domestic and international flight routes by passengers
Rank	Airport 1	Airport 2	2019
1	Istanbul/Sabiha Gökçen	Izmir	2,751,298
2	Istanbul/Sabiha Gökçen	Antalya	2,616,991
3	Antalya	Moscow/Vnukovo	2,329,578
4	Istanbul/Sabiha Gökçen	Ankara	2,184,197
5	Istanbul/Havalimani	Izmir	1,849,317
6	Istanbul/Sabiha Gökçen	Trabzon	1,579,391
7	Istanbul/Havalimani	Antalya	1,524,256
8	Istanbul/Havalimani	Tehran	1,460,900
9	Istanbul/Sabiha Gökçen	Adana	1,448,183
10	Istanbul/Havalimani	Ankara	1,411,924

Note: In 2019, the Atatürk – Izmir route had 728,279 passengers as the old Istanbul airport in Atatürk was also serving the traffic during this year. The new Istanbul Airport in Havalimani opened on 6 April 2019.

=== United States ===
The statistics below are based on metro areas, not individual airports.

Busiest flight routes by city pairs within the United States:
Rank	City 1	City 2	Passengers (Sep 2014 – Aug 2015)
1	Chicago, IL	New York, NY	4,020,000
2	Los Angeles, CA	San Francisco, CA	3,660,000
3	Los Angeles, CA	New York, NY	3,420,000
4	Chicago, IL	Los Angeles, CA	3,010,000
5	Miami, FL	New York, NY	2,750,000
6	Atlanta, GA	Chicago, IL	2,720,000
7	Chicago, IL	Minneapolis, MN	2,720,000
8	Atlanta, GA	New York, NY	2,600,000
9	Atlanta, GA	Orlando, FL	2,620,000
10	Chicago, IL	Washington, DC	2,620,000

== See also ==
- List of busiest passenger flight routes
