= Hong Kong–Taipei route =

Flights between Hong Kong and Taipei

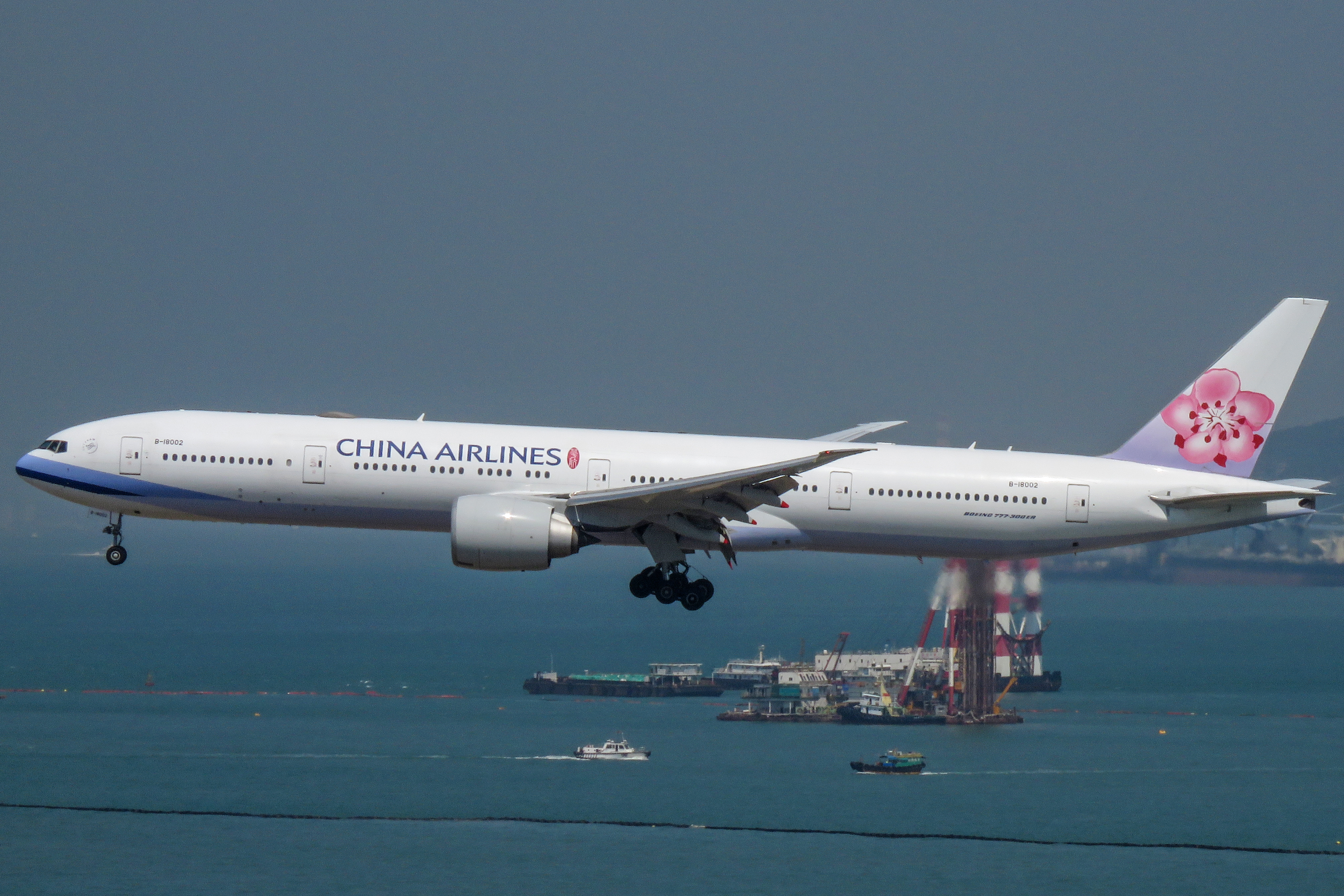
A China Airlines Boeing 777-300ER landing to Hong Kong International Airport

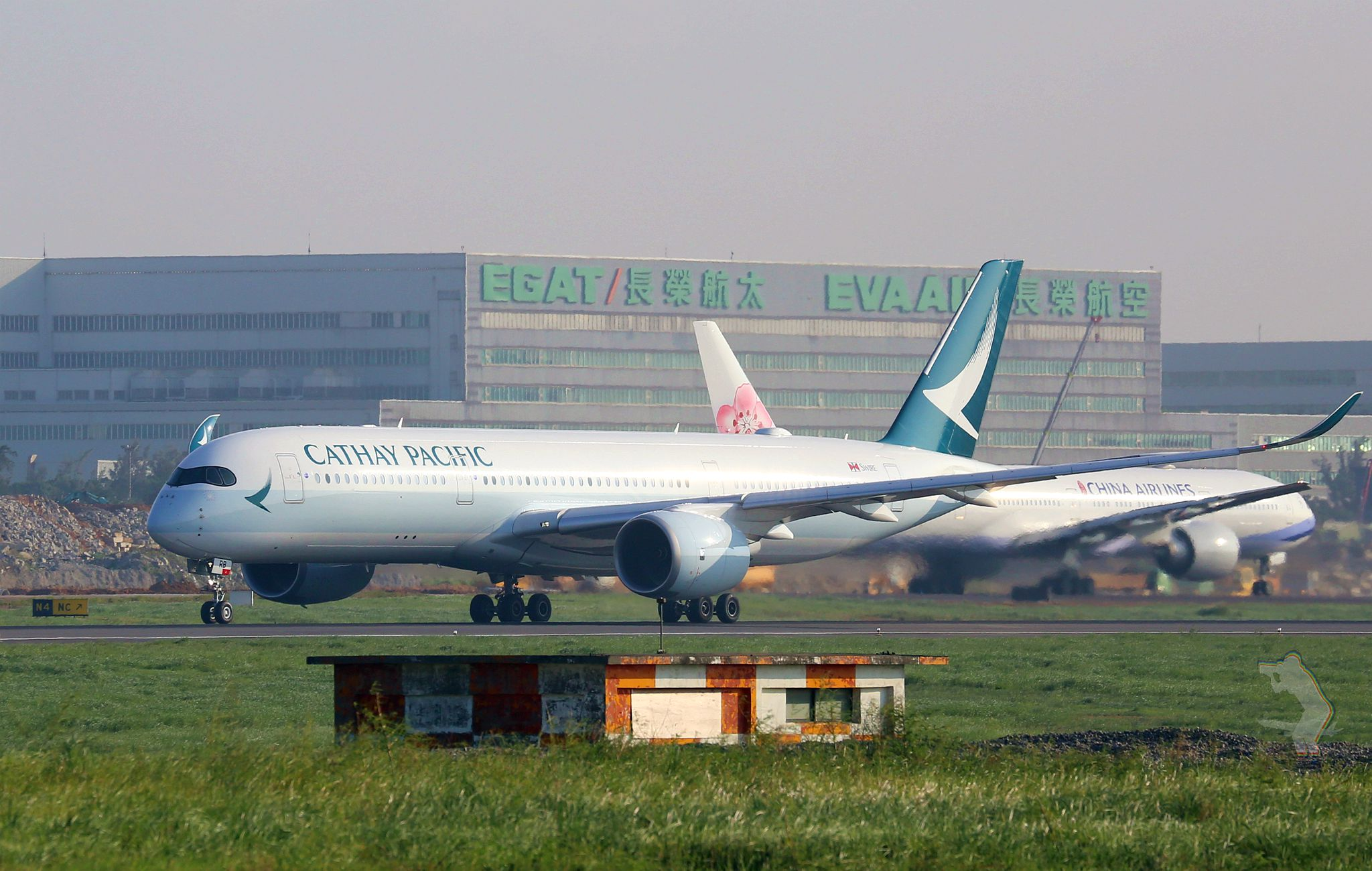
A Cathay Pacific Airbus A350-900 taking off from Taoyuan International Airport

The route between Hong Kong International Airport (and its predecessor the Kai Tak Airport) and Taoyuan International Airport (which replaced Taipei Songshan Airport as Taipei's main airport) is the world's busiest international air route. According to OAG's annual report, there were almost 6.8 million seats offered for the route in 2024.

== Location ==
Opened in 1998, Hong Kong International Airport is one of the world's busiest cargo gateways and passenger airports. Other airports with connections to Hong Kong also had some of the busiest flight routes in the world according to the OAG report in 2019, including Bangkok Suvarnabhumi, Shanghai Pudong, Seoul Incheon, and Ninoy Aquino International Airport.

Opened in 1979, Taoyuan International Airport is the main international airport serving Taiwan. Despite being located in Taoyuan, the airport is referred to as "Taipei airport" since it serves the city of Taipei, and most flights from Taipei to Hong Kong depart from Taoyuan International Airport rather than Taipei Songshan Airport after Taoyuan Airport opened.

Before the Cross-strait charter was established in 2008, most Taishang who travelled to mainland China needed to transfer via third-party airports; and Hong Kong International Airport became the most popular airport at the time. The Hong Kong–Taipei route, therefore, was used to travel between Taiwan and China. But even though the Cross-strait charter was established, transportation needs between Hong Kong and Taiwan are still high for its active civilian exchanges.

== History ==
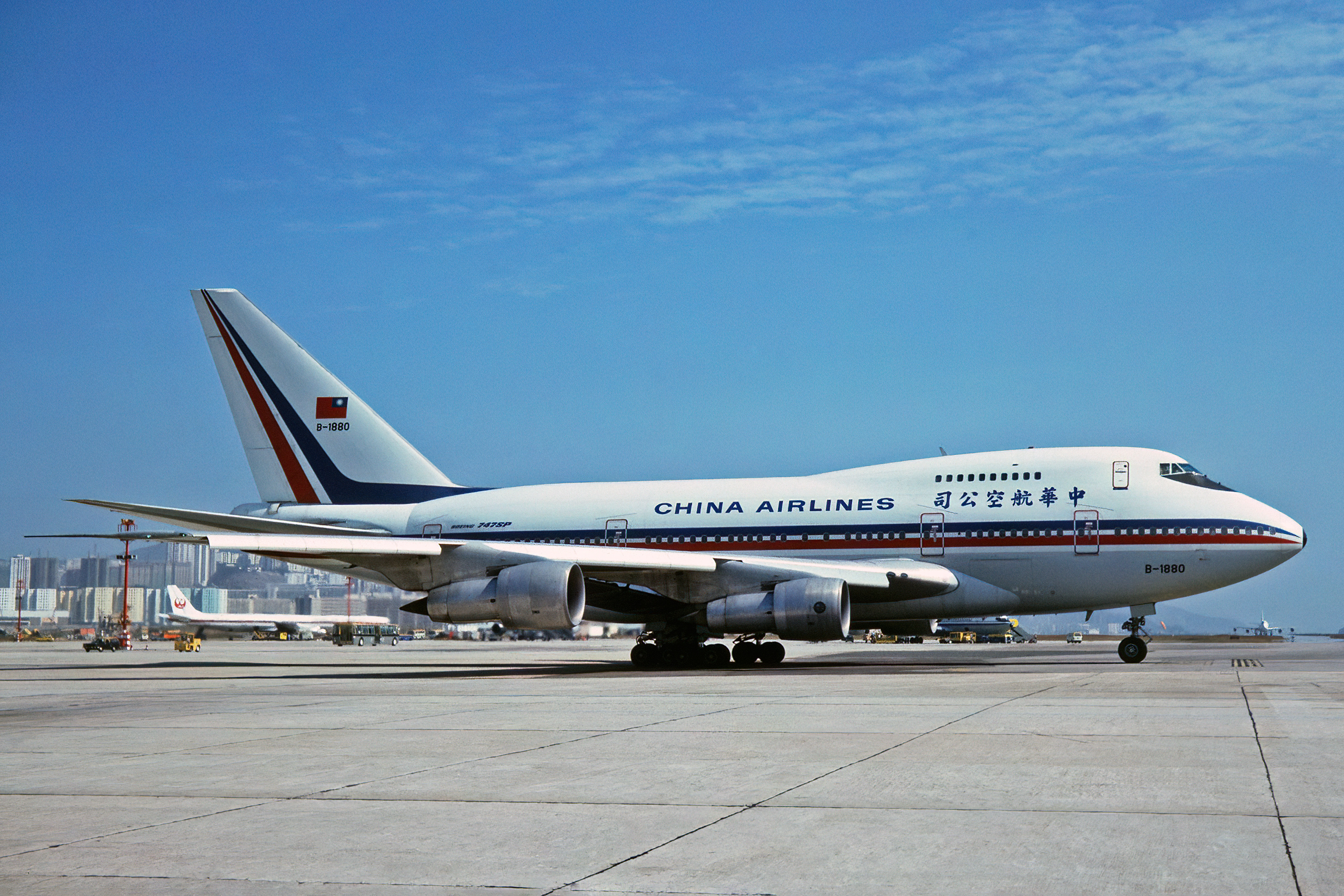
A China Airlines Boeing 747SP in Kai Tak Airport. Photographed in 1981.

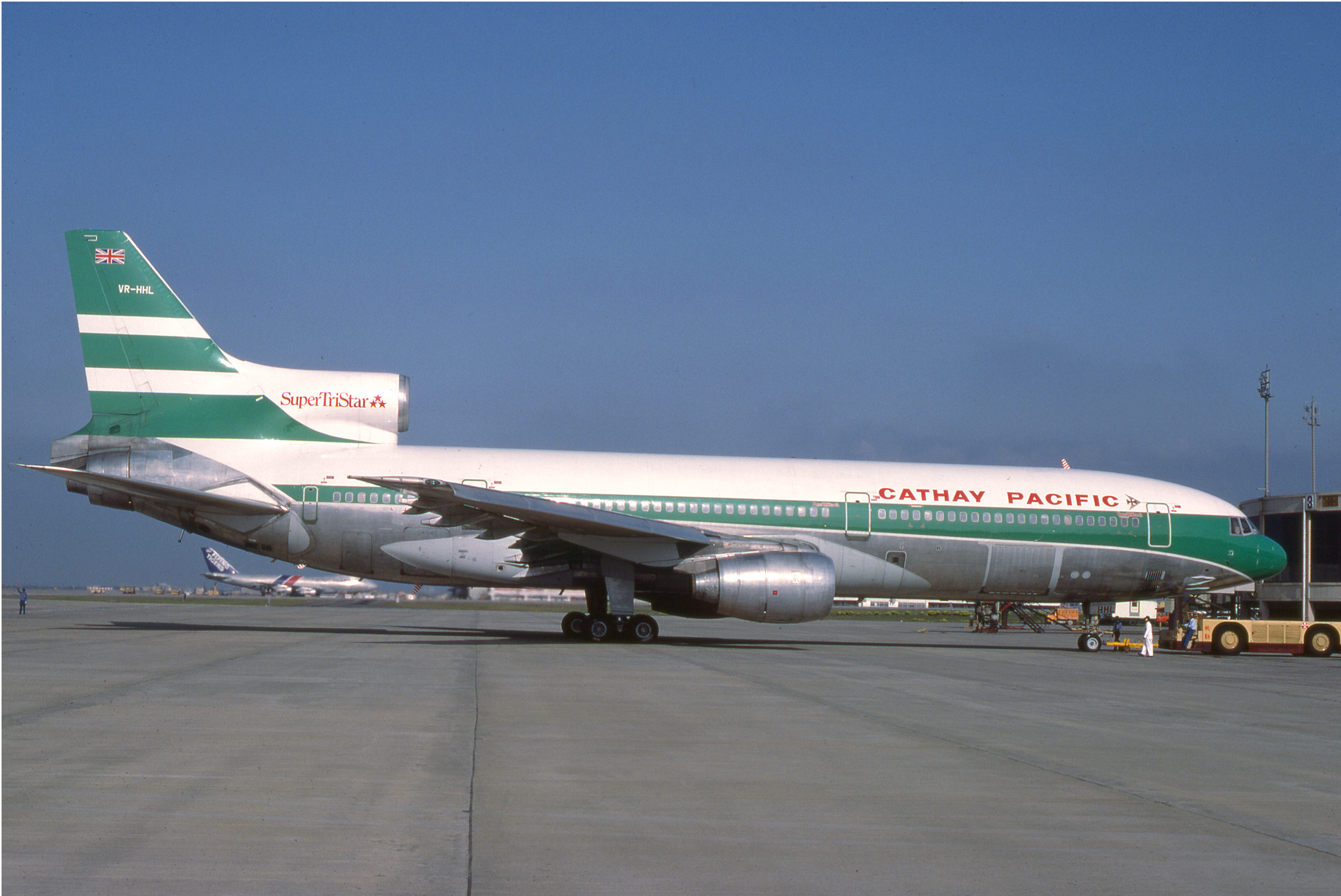
A Cathay Pacific Lockheed L-1011 TriStar in Chiang Kai-shek International Airport. Photographed in 1984.

=== British Hong Kong ===
British Hong Kong Airways established a flight route between Hong Kong and Taipei, one flight a week in November 1949, after the Nationalist government of the Republic of China retreated to the island of Taiwan. The airline expanded the Hong Kong–Taipei flight to two flights a week in 1952. In addition, they also established a Hong Kong–Taipei–Tokyo route, which was two flights a week. The Taiwanese Civil Air Transport (CAT) also established Taipei–Hong Kong–Bangkok and Hong Kong–Taipei–Tokyo routes at the time. Both civil aviation companies extended their Hong Kong–Taipei route to Tokyo in 1954. As of March 1955, there were four flights on the route per week.

In July 1959, Cathay Pacific acquired Hong Kong Airways and began operating the Hong Kong–Taipei flight. Songshan Airport in Taipei was a stepover airport at the time. China Airlines started operating the route from 1969.

Passenger traffic on the Hong Kong–Taipei route started booming after Taiwan lifted its Martial Law and allowed visits to cross-strait relatives in 1987. Both Cathay Pacific and China Airlines gradually added flights to the route at the time. There were around 30 flights operated by Cathay Pacific in 1987.

=== During the handover of Hong Kong ===
During the negotiations for new air rights as part of Sino-British negotiations, both China and the United Kingdom agreed that civil aviation companies would operate the Hong Kong–Taipei route.

Cathay Pacific and China Airlines signed air rights agreement in 1989, valid through 20 April, 1995. In 1994, there were five airlines operating air transport services between Taiwan and Hong Kong, namely China Airlines, Cathay Pacific, Japan Asia Airways, Singapore Airlines, and Thai Airways. In 1995, when the agreement was going to expire, China attempted to direct the agreement renewal into opening the cross-strait charters by citing Article 132 of Hong Kong Basic Law. Taiwan, however, denied the attempt and instead negotiated with Macau. Since China didn't oppose the negotiation, Taiwan (represented by Taipei Airlines Association) and Macau (represented by Air Macau) reached an agreement on the Macau–Taipei route and the Hong Kong–Taipei route in December 1995.

In June 1996, both Cathay Pacific and Dragonair signed an agreement with the Taipei Airlines Association. There were four parties of the agreement, namely Cathay Pacific, China Airlines, Dragonair, and Eva Air. The agreement allowed 254 flights a week to the route. Under the agreement, Cathay Pacific would operate 100 passenger flights and 6 cargo flights, China Airlines would operate 105 passenger flights and six cargo flights, Dragonair would operate 21 passenger flights to Kaohsiung, and Eva Air would operate 16 passenger flights. Hong Kong airlines followed the "one airline, one route" policy at the time, which forced Cathay Pacific to give up the Kaohsiung flight to Dragonair, the company whose stakes were held by Cathay Pacific.

=== After handing over ===
The second negotiation for the Hong Kong–Taipei route took place in 2001. However, the negotiation progress went slowly because of various reasons, including China Airlines Flight 611, different opinions on the "one airline, one route" policy, number of flights, and negotiating parties. (Note: Taiwan proposed an "government-to-government" negotiation model, while Hong Kong, under pressure from China, insisted on "company-to-company" negotiation model.) Finally, Cathay Pacific, Dragonair, Air Hong Kong and Taipei Airlines Association signed the new agreement on 29 June 2002. The new agreement abolished the "one airline, one route" policy. It also allowed 303 flights a week on the route at the time, and 320 flights a week in 2004. Under the new agreement, Air Hong Kong and Mandarin Airlines could operate the route. The arrangement was valid through June 2007, and both parties could extend the existing agreement every six months until the new one was signed.

In December 2011, the Hong Kong Economic, Trade and Cultural Office and the Taipei Economic and Cultural Office in Hong Kong signed a new agreement, allowing 198 passenger flights and 2,800 tonnes of cargo capacities per week respectively for each side, and 205 passenger flights and 3,000 tonnes in 2012. The new agreement also removed airline details, with each party allocating capacities to operators based on internal regulations.

== Operating ==
The average flight time of the Hong Kong–Taipei route is around 120 minutes. Before the COVID-19 pandemic, it was the world's busiest international airline route in 2014-2016 and 2019. In 2017 and 2018, it was the world's second busiest international airline route, after the Kuala Lumpur–Singapore route. In 2019, there were 7,965,538 seats for the route. In the COVID-19 pandemic, total seats dropped to 93,922 and ranked 8th in the world, compared to 147,950 seats of the Cairo–Jeddah route. In 2023, there were 4,568,280 seats available, and ranked 3rd in the world. However, the seats were only 57% compared to 2019. In 2024, Hong Kong–Taipei route provided 6,781,577 seats, ranked the busiest international air route in the world in the year again.

Cathay Pacific, whose hub is located in Hong Kong and attracts transfer passengers, occupied the largest airline share on the Hong Kong–Taipei route. In 2015, the airline provided 45.6% of total seats, while 29.2% for China Airlines Group, 13.7% for EVA Air, and 11.2% for Dragonair and Hong Kong Airlines. Dragonair, however, was closed in 2020 by Cathay Pacific. HK Express established flights for the route in August 2021, making it the first low-cost carrier of the route, while Greater Bay Airlines established in December 2022, and Starlux Airlines established in July 2024. In addition. Japan Asia Airways and Thai Airways International had also operated the route.

Total traffic of the route between 2017 and 2020
Year	Cathay Pacific	China Airlines	EVA Air	Dragonair	Hong Kong Airlines	Total
2017	2,864,597	1,606,578	1,169,732	222,957	757,217	6,621,081
2018	2,713,238	1,440,428 (Note: A return flight operated by Mandarin Airlines was not included. There were 98 passengers on the flight.)	1,212,771	230,940	740,259	6,337,734
2019	2,735,390	1,288,895	1,127,156	234,947	723,453	6,109,841
Total	8,313,225	4,335,901	3,509,659	688,844	2,220,929	19,068,558
Average market share	43.5965%	22.7385%	18.4055%	3.6125%	11.6471%	100%

== Accidents ==
There were two fatal accidents on the flights: one was China Airlines Flight 642 in 1999, and the other was China Airlines Flight 611 in 2002. Both of them were operated by China Airlines, and it contributed to the perception of China Airlines having a poor reputation for safety. Julian Kuo, the member of the parliament in Taiwan at the time, requested more airlines to operate the Hong Kong-Taipei flights, and opposed including China Airlines in the allocation of new flights.

== See also ==
- London to New York Air Route
- Hong Kong–Taiwan relations
- Longest flights
- List of busiest passenger flight routes
