= List of busiest passenger flight routes =

These are lists of the busiest flight routes by the number of passengers flown, by seat capacity and by aircraft movements in the 2020s. For previous data, see List of busiest passenger flight routes, 2010s

== Global statistics ==
=== By available seats ===
The following are the lists of the world's busiest flight routes based on the number of seats available in the flights scheduled in both directions. Note that these statistics do not consider the number of passengers actually carried (load factor). OAG did not conduct the busiest flights survey in 2020. As of 2025, all of the top 10 busiest routes are domestic. The busiest international route connects Hong Kong and Taipei–Taoyuan, ranked 11th overall. (See the international route table further below.)

==== Top 10 flight routes by available seats ====
Rank	Airport 1	Airport 2	Distance (km)	2025	2024	2023	2022	2021
1	Jeju	Seoul–Gimpo	449	14,384,766	14,183,719	13,728,786	16,068,983	17,082,700
2	Sapporo–Chitose	Tokyo–Haneda	835	12,099,499	11,931,572	11,936,302	10,216,765	8,171,324
3	Fukuoka	Tokyo–Haneda	889	11,496,706	11,335,551	11,264,229	9,894,296	7,562,387
4	Hanoi	Ho Chi Minh City	1171	11,078,775	10,631,435	10,883,555	8,562,009	6,806,131
5	Jeddah	Riyadh	857	9,819,558	8,700,415	7,902,142	7,371,119	6,677,097
6	Sydney	Melbourne	705	8,951,497	9,217,377	9,342,312	6,996,156	
7	Tokyo–Haneda	Naha	1573	8,052,864	8,033,641	7,982,218	6,910,809	5,602,408
8	Mumbai	Delhi	1150	7,642,016	7,963,686	7,276,430	6,941,947	4,891,881
9	Beijing–Capital	Shanghai–Hongqiao	1081	7,454,950	7,714,758	8,355,225	6,321,194	7,910,793
10	Shanghai–Hongqiao	Shenzhen	1217	7,138,673	6,856,215	6,969,789		6,555,365
	Hong Kong	Taipei–Taoyuan	802	6,832,683	6,781,577	4,568,280		1,296,969
	Guangzhou	Shanghai–Hongqiao	1176	6,354,894	7,010,321	7,162,999		6,350,115
	Jakarta	Denpasar	991			7,190,961	6,741,923	3,939,509
	Seoul–Gimpo	Busan	328					6,297,916
	Bogotá	Medellín	232	6,219,202	6,664,812			
	Cancún	Mexico City	1294					5,604,043
	Beijing–Capital	Shenzhen	1979	5,593,766	5,603,413	5,273,976		3,978,144
	Cape Town	Johannesburg	1292	5,475,986	5,084,762			4,001,680
	Jakarta	Makassar	1439					4,895,779
	Tokyo–Haneda	Osaka–Itami	407					4,728,321
	Chengdu-Shuangliu	Beijing–Capital	1559	4,605,879	4,600,812			4,734,834
	Jeju	Busan	293					4,176,876
	Jakarta	Medan	1401					4,060,426

==== International flight routes (airport pairs) by available seats ====
Rank	Airport 1	Airport 2	2025	2024	2023	2022	2021
1	Hong Kong	Taipei-Taoyuan	6,832,683	6,781,577	4,568,280		1,296,969
2	Cairo	Jeddah	5,753,491	5,469,274	4,795,712	3,234,683	2,031,882
3	Kuala Lumpur	Singapore	5,574,409	5,382,163	4,891,952	2,443,176	
4	Seoul-Incheon	Tokyo-Narita	5,069,779	5,410,456	4,155,418		
5	Seoul-Incheon	Osaka-Kansai	4,959,596	4,982,769	4,218,484		
6	Jakarta	Singapore	4,619,323	4,069,071	3,910,502		
7	Dubai	Riyadh	4,465,632	4,306,599	3,990,076	3,191,090	1,540,444
8	Bangkok-Suvarnabhumi	Hong Kong	4,169,125	4,201,802			
9	Taipei-Taoyuan	Tokyo-Narita	4,021,181				
10	London–Heathrow	New York–JFK	3,971,000	4,011,235	3,878,590	2,848,044	1,364,286
	Bangkok-Suvarnabhumi	Singapore		4,033,344	3,478,474		
	Bangkok-Suvarnabhumi	Seoul-Incheon			3,362,968		
	Dubai	London–Heathrow				2,697,593	1,298,756
	Dubai	Jeddah				2,425,930	
	Mumbai	Dubai				1,977,537	
	Cairo	Riyadh				1,913,991	1,357,685
	Delhi	Dubai				1,898,749	1,381,137
	Moscow Domodedovo	Simferopol					2,333,305
	Orlando	San Juan			2,436,988		2,025,654
	Moscow Sheremetyevo	Simferopol					2,000,319
	Tehran Imran Khomeini	Istanbul					1,404,075
	Bahrain	Dubai					1,319,732
	Cancun	Dallas/Fort Worth					1,305,749
	New York–JFK	Santiago (DO)					1,304,148
	Antalya	Moscow Sheremetyevo					1,293,937
	Houston	Mexico City					1,282,394
	Dubai	Istanbul					1,221,880
	New York–JFK	Santo Domingo					1,199,942
	Dubai	Male					1,166,944

=== By aircraft movements ===
The following are the lists of the world's busiest flight routes based on the number of scheduled flights in both directions. Note that these statistics do not consider the number of passengers carried.

==== Domestic ====
Domestic
Rank	Airport 1	Airport 2	# of flights (Jan – Nov 2021)	Airlines (2025)
1	Jeju (CJU)	Seoul (GMP)	71,388	Air Busan, Air Seoul, Asiana Airlines, Eastar Jet, Jeju Air, Jin Air, Korean Air, Parata Air, T'way Air
2	Seoul (GMP)	Busan (PUS)	28,809	Air Busan, Eastar Jet, Jeju Air, Jin Air, Korean Air, T'way Air
3	Jeddah (JED)	Riyadh (RUH)	24,879	Flyadeal, Flynas, Saudia
4	Fukuoka (FUK)	Tokyo (HND)	23,079	All Nippon Airways, Japan Airlines, Skymark Airlines, StarFlyer
5	Sapporo (CTS)	Tokyo (HND)	21,851	Air Do, All Nippon Airways, Japan Airlines, Skymark Airlines
6	Mexico City (MEX)	Cancún (CUN)	21,352	Aeroméxico, Aeroméxico Connect, Magnicharters, VivaAerobús, Volaris
7	Shanghai (SHA)	Shenzhen (SZX)	19,945	China Eastern Airlines, China Southern Airlines, Juneyao Air, Shanghai Airlines, Shenzhen Airlines, Spring Airlines, XiamenAir
8	Beijing (PEK)	Shanghai (SHA)	18,624	Air China, China Eastern Airlines, Hainan Airlines, OTT Airlines, Shanghai Airlines
9	Hanoi (HAN)	Ho Chi Minh City (SGN)	18,342	Bamboo Airways, Pacific Airlines, VietJet Air, Vietnam Airlines, Vietravel Airlines
10	Bogotá (BOG)	Rionegro (MDE)	18,086	Avianca, LATAM, JetSmart, Wingo
11	Guangzhou (CAN)	Shanghai (SHA)	18,066	Air China, China Eastern Airlines, China Southern Airlines, Hainan Airlines, Juneyao Airlines, Shanghai Airlines, Shenzhen Airlines, Spring Airlines
12	Jeju (CJU)	Busan (PUS)	17,630	Air Busan, Jeju Air, Eastar Jet, Jin Air, Korean Air
13	Mumbai (BOM)	Delhi (DEL)	17,069	Air India, IndiGo, SpiceJet
14	Los Angeles (LAX)	San Francisco (SFO)	15,828	Alaska Airlines, American Airlines, American Eagle, Delta Air Lines, Delta Connection, JetBlue, Southwest Airlines, United Airlines
15	Okinawa (OKA)	Tokyo (HND)	15,687	All Nippon Airways, Japan Airlines, Skymark Airlines, Solaseed Air
16	Cape Town (CPT)	Johannesburg (JNB)	15,208	Airlink, CemAir, FlySafair, LIFT Airline, South African Airways
17	Chengdu (CTU)	Beijing (PEK)	15,180	Air China, Hainan Airlines, Sichuan Airlines
18	Los Angeles (LAX)	Las Vegas (LAS)	15,026	Alaska Airlines, Allegiant Air, American Airlines, Delta Air Lines, JetBlue, JSX, Southwest Airlines, Spirit Airlines, Sun Country Airlines, United Express, United Airlines
19	Chengdu (CTU)	Guangzhou (CAN)	14,746	Air China, Chengdu Airlines, China Eastern Airlines, China Southern Airlines, Shenzhen Airlines, Sichuan Airlines
20	Bogotá (BOG)	Cali (CLO)	14,604	Avianca, LATAM, Ultra Air, Viva Air, Wingo

==== International ====
The only international route to make the Top 50 busiest routes in 2021 was between Saint Barthélemy (SBH) and Sint Maarten (SXM).

== Regional statistics ==
=== Europe by passengers carried ===
Busiest flight routes originating within the EU, Switzerland, and Turkey. Passenger numbers are reported for routes with more than 1.2 million passengers, based on airport statistics collected by Eurostat. Therefore, domestic routes within the UK, Norway or Russia, as well as international routes involving the UK, Norway and Russia (that do not originate in the EU, Switzerland, or Turkey) are excluded.

Data retrieved from Eurostat, 2020–2024
Rank	Airport 1	Airport 2	2024	2023	2022	2021	2020
1	Barcelona/El Prat	Palma de Mallorca	2,323,085	2,281,017	2,033,205	1,220,540	820,742
2	Madrid/Barajas	Palma de Mallorca	2,206,891	2,037,823	1,877,938	1,140,759	793,794
3	Madrid/Barajas	Barcelona/El Prat	2,036,488	1,931,782	1,715,592	1,013,754	754,090
4	Istanbul	Teheran	2,050,223	1,978,704			
5	Madrid/Barajas	Rome/Fiumicino	1,979,946	1,755,266	1,291,186	457,111	288,463
6	Madrid/Barajas	Gran Canaria	1,970,045	1,604,867	1,430,978	937,084	638,092
7	Rome/Fiumicino	Catania	1,941,657	1,557,398	1,541,879	1,060,641	648,964
8	Madrid/Barajas	Lisbon	1,905,986	1,857,763	1,538,344	573,206	415,465
9	Dublin	London/Heathrow	1,903,141	1,693,623	1,319,845	404,011	445,413
10	Istanbul	Izmir	1,899,873	1,846,027			
11	Paris/CDG	New York/JFK	1,852,909	1,770,083	1,474,421		
12	Oslo/Gardermoen	Trondheim	N/A	N/A	1,839,520	1,005,775	918,615
13	Paris/CDG	Nice	1,835,263	1,660,471	1,598,238	699,762	744,588
14	Oslo/Gardermoen	Bergen	N/A	N/A	1,737,598	991,026	869,489
15	Oslo/Gardermoen	Stavanger	N/A	N/A	1,392,824	785,512	720,102
16	Madrid/Barajas	Tenerife Norte	1,785,863	1,427,756	1,291,140	875,428	617,739
17	Istanbul	Antalya	1,743,262	1,793,235			
18	Barcelona/El Prat	Rome/Fiumicino	1,706,636	1,487,935	952,609		
19	Athens/El. Venizelos	Thessaloniki/Macedonia	1,649,094	1,488,210	1,348,368	826,643	551,914
20	Rome/Fiumicino	Palermo/Falcone Borsellino	1,675,982	1,392,767	1,176,181	741,588	549,692
21	Madrid/Barajas	Paris/Orly	1,585,160	1,595,353	1,371,546	707,707	460,765
22	Amsterdam	Barcelona/El Prat	1,560,944	1,464,378	1,207,526	608,458	377,835
23	Antalya	Moscow/Vnukovo	1,574,990	1,428,502			
24	Madrid/Barajas	London/Heathrow	1,550,044	1,471,851	1,184,916	425,692	454,469
25	Istanbul/Sabiha Gökçen	Ercan	1,547,419				
26	Madrid/Barajas	Bogotá	1,546,093	1,332,494	1,089,805		
27	Paris/Orly	Lisbon	1,527,513	1,536,968	1,265,314		
28	Ankara	Istanbul	1,497,202	1,467,255			
29	Amsterdam	London/Heathrow	1,460,366	1,385,669	1,140,162		
30	Athens/El. Venizelos	Heraklion	1,452,941	1,236,107	1,129,938	650,400	504,120
31	Istanbul	Dubai	1,429,665	1,401,593			
32	Frankfurt/Main	London/Heathrow	1,410,787	1,326,501	1,039,663		
33	Lisbon	Madeira	1,395,044	1,351,864	1,224,493		
34	Düsseldorf	Palma de Mallorca	1,378,269	1,314,889	1,290,938		
35	Athens/El. Venizelos	Santorini	1,377,866	1,217,958	1,091,316	569,193	294,903
36	Antalya	Moscow/Sheremetyevo	1,373,168	976,754			
37	Athens/El. Venizelos	Larnaca	1,365,755	1,205,320	1,124,993	622,148	427,252
38	Paris/CDG	Montreal/Trudeau	1,361,014	1,426,032	1,191,698		
39	Oslo/Gardermoen	Copenhagen	1,358,355	1,339,246	1,214,749	405,422	405,748
40	Barcelona/El Prat	London/Gatwick	1,353,516	1,277,136	1,008,822		
41	Barcelona/El Prat	Lisbon	1,305,408	1,184,992	919,674		
42	Munich	London/Heathrow	1,304,262	1,202,640	929,055		
43	Amsterdam/Schiphol	Dublin	1,297,434	1,187,883	1,003,177		
44	Paris/CDG	Barcelona/El Prat	1,291,815	1,120,586	1,104,723	420,862	348,322
45	Istanbul	London/Heathrow	1,281,925	1,219,212			
46	Munich	Hamburg	1,281,439	1,179,665	1,040,077		
47	Copenhagen	Stockholm/Arlanda	1,291,795	1,183,193	967,547		
48	Barcelona/El Prat	Milano/Malpensa	1,279,578	977,917	788,230		
49	Paris/Orly	Toulouse	1,276,245	1,439,153	1,661,460		
50	Paris/CDG	Dublin	1,268,474	1,233,921	1,063,771		
51	Barcelona/El Prat	Ibiza	1,259,182	1,241,182	1,101,128		
52	Istanbul	Moscow/Vnukovo	1,235,902	1,141,894			
53	Amsterdam/Schiphol	Madrid/Barajas	1,229,639	1,076,562	980,534	458,560	359,582
54	Madrid/Barajas	Mexico City	1,208,106	1,086,861	907,328		

== National statistics ==
=== Brazil ===
Busiest domestic flight routes in Brazil by passengers
Rank	Airport 1	Airport 2	2022
1	Rio de Janeiro-Santos Dumont	São Paulo-Congonhas	2,978,669
2	Porto Alegre	São Paulo-Congonhas	1,630,763
3	Brasília	São Paulo-Congonhas	1,565,820
4	Recife	São Paulo-Guarulhos	1,545,757
5	Porto Alegre	São Paulo-Guarulhos	1,524,626
6	Belo Horizonte	São Paulo-Congonhas	1,494,260
7	Salvador	São Paulo-Congonhas	1,290,367
8	Belo Horizonte	São Paulo-Guarulhos	1,234,256
9	Recife	São Paulo-Congonhas	1,169,156
10	Brasília	Rio de Janeiro-Santos Dumont	1,142,563

=== China ===
Busiest domestic flight routes in China by seats
Rank	Airport 1	Airport 2	2024	2023
1	Beijing Capital	Shanghai Hongqiao	7,714,758	8,355,225
2	Guangzhou Baiyun	Shanghai Hongqiao	7,010,321	7,162,999
3	Shanghai Hongqiao	Shenzhen	6,856,215	6,969,789
4	Beijing Capital	Shenzhen	5,603,413	5,273,976
5	Guangzhou Baiyun	Hangzhou	4,642,437	4,662,975
6	Chengdu Shuangliu	Beijing Capital	4,600,812	4,161,165
7	Guangzhou Baiyun	Beijing Capital	4,272,117	3,783,605
8	Hangzhou	Shenzhen	4,266,024	4,281,873
9	Guangzhou Baiyun	Beijing Daxing	4,132,304	4,269,799
10	Chongqing	Shenzhen	3,239,066	
	Beijing Daxing	Shenzhen		3,302,381

=== India ===
Busiest domestic flight routes from/to Indian cities by passengers
Rank	Airport 1	Airport 2	2023–2024	2022–2023	2011–2022	2020–2021	2020–2021
1	Delhi	Mumbai	6,466,940			1,430,543	
2	Bengaluru	Delhi	4,779,347			1,240,378	
3	Bengaluru	Mumbai	4,433,746			691,598	
4	Delhi	Hyderabad	2,916,911			1,065,132	
5	Delhi	Kolkata	2,821,077			938,388	
6	Delhi	Pune	2,805,587			809,773	
7	Delhi	Srinagar	2,625,483			1,261,630	
8	Mumbai	Chennai	2,486,921				
9	Delhi	Ahmedabad	2,402,170			711,690	
10	Delhi	Chennai	2,317,258			739,220	
11	Mumbai	Hyderabad	2,248,905				
12	Bengaluru	Hyderabad	2,140,533				
13	Mumbai	Ahmedabad	2,108,650				
14	Bengaluru	Kolkata	1,957,504				
15	Bengaluru	Pune	1,783,570				
–	Kolkata	Bengaluru				1,262,780	
–	Delhi	Patna				1,072,840	
–	Delhi	Goa				765,398	
–	Delhi	Guwahati				747,471	
–	Mumbai	Goa				730,108	
–	Kolkata	Hyderabad				674,027	

=== Mexico ===
Busiest domestic flight routes in Mexico by passengers
Rank	Airport 1	Airport 2	2024	2023	2022	2021	2020
1	Mexico City	Cancún		4,335,174	4,803,489	4,546,906	2,874,267
2	Monterrey	Mexico City		3,404,529	3,180,969	2,244,156	1,563,243
3	Mexico City	Guadalajara		3,012,874	2,916,413	1,940,131	1,536,441
4	Tijuana	Mexico City		2,300,547	2,519,260	2,133,168	1,307,478
5	Tijuana	Guadalajara		2,142,087	2,209,718	1,825,055	1,301,775
6	Mexico City	Mérida		1,896,586	1,943,683	1,416,257	909,396
7	Monterrey	Cancún		1,810,719	1,650,289	1,458,920	822,601
8	Puerto Vallarta	Mexico City		1,140,366	1,333,474	1,008,024	575,158
9	Guadalajara	Cancún		1,098,997	1,026,505	1,051,887	635,422
10	San José del Cabo	Mexico City		1,071,051	1,215,421	994,510	594,263

Busiest international flight routes from/to Mexico by passengers
Rank	Airport 1	Airport 2	2024	2023	2022	2021	2020
1	Cancún	Dallas/Fort Worth		1,160,043	1,215,860	1,026,047	507,946
2	Cancún	Houston/Intercontinental		1,137,242	1,112,498	930,801	504,622
3	Guadalajara	Los Angeles		1,079,804	903,149	787,850	530,232
4	Mexico City	Madrid		1,030,882	900,028	504,962	265,919
5	Cancún	Chicago/O'Hare		1,011,503	992,998	806,188	409,671
6	Mexico City	Bogotá		925,729	912,549	432,080	233,726
7	Mexico City	Los Angeles		891,713	846,757	771,673	379,603
8	Mexico City	Houston/Intercontinental		889,431	879,133	961,069	332,243
9	Cancún	Atlanta		884,252	759,622	586,573	303,913
10	Cancún	Toronto-Pearson		772,937	546,583	119,334	298,135
