= List of Hong Kong Airlines destinations =

As of July 2026, Hong Kong Airlines and Hong Kong Air Cargo operate to the following destinations:

== Destinations ==
Country/region	City	Airport	Notes	Refs
Australia	Cairns	Cairns Airport	Terminated	
Australia	Gold Coast	Gold Coast Airport	Seasonal	
Australia	Melbourne	Melbourne Airport	Passenger	
Australia	Sydney	Sydney Airport	Passenger	
Bangladesh	Dhaka	Hazrat Shahjalal International Airport ^{Cargo}	Cargo	
Cambodia	Phnom Penh	Phnom Penh International Airport	Terminated	
Canada	Vancouver	Vancouver International Airport	Passenger	
China	Beijing	Beijing Capital International Airport	Passenger	
China	Beijing	Beijing Daxing International Airport	Passenger	
China	Changchun	Changchun Longjia International Airport	Terminated	
China	Chengdu	Chengdu Shuangliu International Airport	Passenger	
China	Chengdu	Chengdu Tianfu International Airport	Terminated	
China	Chongqing	Chongqing Jiangbei International Airport	Passenger	
China	Fuzhou	Fuzhou Changle International Airport	Terminated	
China	Guiyang	Guiyang Longdongbao International Airport	Terminated	
China	Haikou	Haikou Meilan International Airport	Passenger	
China	Hailar	Hulunbuir Hailar Airport	Passenger	
China	Hangzhou	Hangzhou Xiaoshan International Airport	Passenger	
China	Lijiang	Lijiang Sanyi International Airport	Passenger	
China	Nanchang	Nanchang Changbei International Airport	Terminated	
China	Nanjing	Nanjing Lukou International Airport	Passenger	
China	Nanning	Nanning Wuxu International Airport	Terminated	
China	Sanya	Sanya Phoenix International Airport	Passenger	
China	Shanghai	Shanghai Hongqiao International Airport	Passenger	
China	Shanghai	Shanghai Pudong International Airport	Passenger + cargo	
China	Tianjin	Tianjin Binhai International Airport	Terminated	
China	Xi'an	Xi'an Xianyang International Airport	Passenger	
China	Xining	Xining Caojiapu International Airport	Seasonal	
China	Yancheng	Yancheng Nanyang International Airport	Terminated	
China	Zhengzhou	Zhengzhou Xinzheng International Airport	Terminated	
Hong Kong	Hong Kong	Hong Kong International Airport	Hub	
India	Bengaluru	Kempegowda International Airport ^{Cargo}	Terminated	
India	Chennai	Chennai International Airport	Cargo	
India	Delhi	Indira Gandhi International Airport	Cargo	
India	Kolkata	Netaji Subhas Chandra Bose International Airport ^{Cargo}	Terminated	
India	Mumbai	Chhatrapati Shivaji Maharaj International Airport ^{Cargo}	Terminated	
Indonesia	Denpasar	Ngurah Rai International Airport	Passenger	
Italy	Milan	Milan Malpensa Airport ^{Cargo}	Terminated	
Japan	Fukuoka	Fukuoka Airport	Passenger	
Japan	Hakodate	Hakodate Airport	Terminated	
Japan	Kagoshima	Kagoshima Airport	Terminated	
Japan	Kumamoto	Kumamoto Airport	Terminated	
Japan	Miyazaki	Miyazaki Airport	Terminated	
Japan	Nagoya	Chubu Centrair International Airport	Terminated	
Japan	Naha	Naha Airport	Passenger	
Japan	Okayama	Okayama Airport	Terminated	
Japan	Osaka	Kansai International Airport	Passenger	
Japan	Sapporo	New Chitose Airport	Passenger	
Japan	Sendai	Sendai Airport	Terminated	
Japan	Tokyo	Narita International Airport	Passenger	
Japan	Yonago	Miho–Yonago Airport	Terminated	
Kazakhstan	Almaty	Almaty International Airport ^{Cargo}	Cargo	
Laos	Vientiane	Wattay International Airport	Passenger	
Malaysia	Kuala Lumpur	Kuala Lumpur International Airport ^{Cargo}	Terminated	
Malaysia	Kuching	Kuching International Airport	Terminated	
Maldives	Malé	Velana International Airport	Seasonal	
New Zealand	Auckland	Auckland Airport	Terminated	
Northern Mariana Islands	Saipan	Saipan International Airport	Passenger	
Philippines	Laoag	Laoag International Airport	Terminated	
Philippines	Manila	Ninoy Aquino International Airport	Terminated	
Russia	Moscow	Vnukovo International Airport	Terminated	
Singapore	Singapore	Changi Airport ^{Cargo}	Terminated	
South Korea	Seoul	Incheon International Airport	Passenger	
Taiwan	Taichung	Taichung International Airport	Terminated	
Taiwan	Taipei	Taoyuan International Airport	Passenger + cargo	
Thailand	Bangkok	Suvarnabhumi Airport	Passenger + cargo	
Thailand	Chiang Mai	Chiang Mai International Airport	Terminated	
Thailand	Phuket	Phuket International Airport	Passenger	
Turkey	Istanbul	Atatürk Airport ^{Cargo}	Airport closed	
Turkey	Istanbul	Istanbul Airport ^{Cargo}	Cargo	
United Kingdom	Glasgow	Glasgow Prestwick Airport ^{Cargo}	Terminated	
United Kingdom	London	Gatwick Airport	Terminated	
United Kingdom	London	Stansted Airport ^{Cargo}	Cargo	
Uzbekistan	Tashkent	Tashkent International Airport ^{Cargo}	Cargo	
United States	Los Angeles	Los Angeles International Airport	Terminated	
United States	San Francisco	San Francisco International Airport	Terminated	
Vietnam	Da Nang	Da Nang International Airport	Passenger	
Vietnam	Hanoi	Noi Bai International Airport	Cargo	
Vietnam	Ho Chi Minh City	Tan Son Nhat International Airport	Terminated	
