= Hong Kong Airlines =

Chinese airline based in Hong Kong

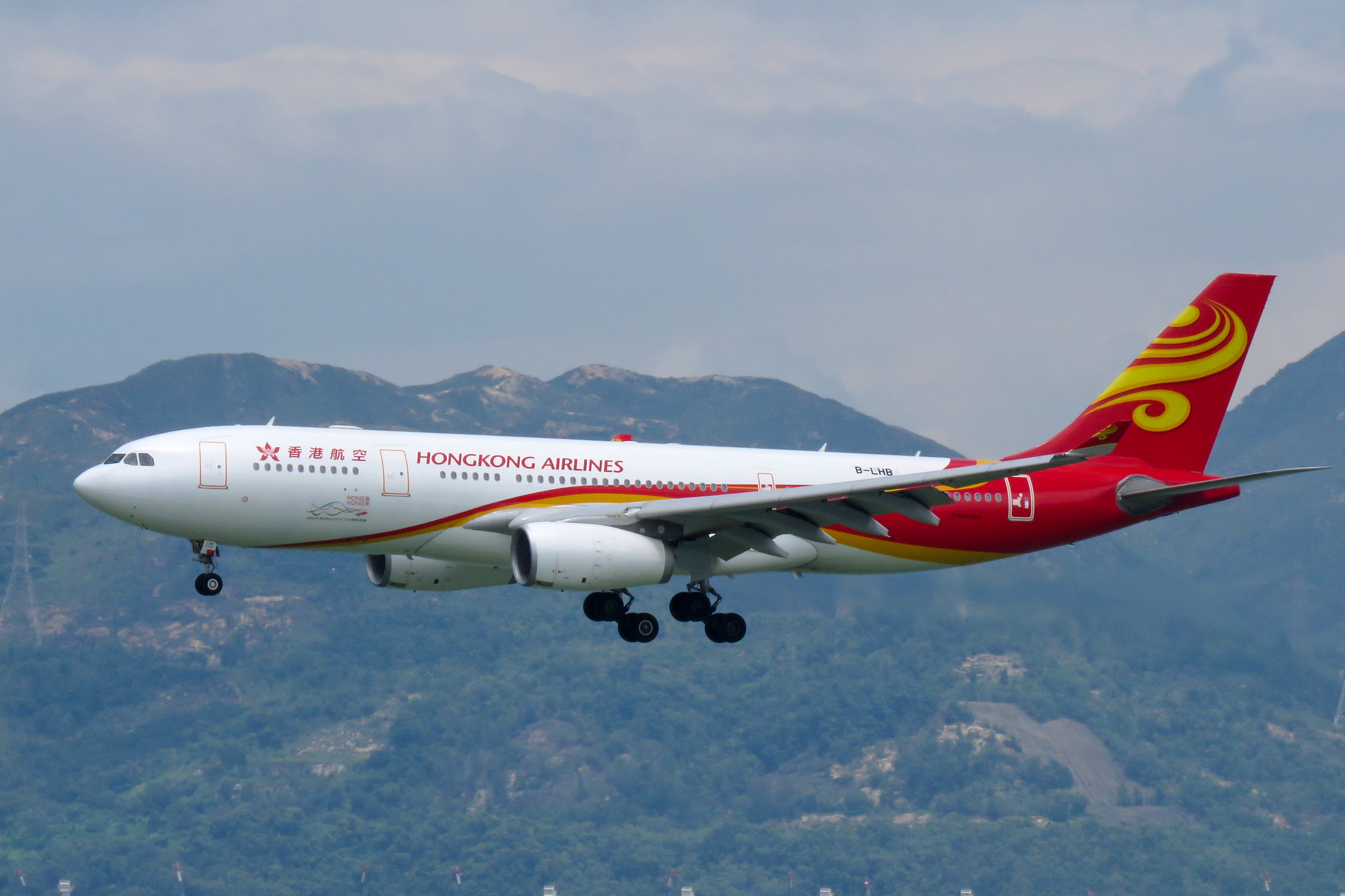
- Hong Kong Airlines Airbus A330-200
IATA	ICAO	Call sign
HX	CRK	BAUHINIA
- Founded: 28 March 2001; 25 years ago (as CR Airways)
- Commenced operations: 22 September 2006; 20 years ago (as Hong Kong Airlines)
- AOC #: 15
- Hubs: Hong Kong International Airport
- Frequent-flyer program: Fortune Wings Club
- Subsidiaries: Hong Kong Air Cargo
- Fleet size: 33
- Destinations: 47
- Parent company: HNA Aviation
- Headquarters: Hong Kong
- Key people: Jeff Sun Jianfeng (President); Yan Bo (Chairman)
- Website: www.hongkongairlines.com

Hong Kong Airlines
- Chinese: 香港航空
- Cantonese Yale: Hēunggóng Hòhnghūng
Transcriptions
Standard Mandarin
- Hanyu Pinyin: Xiānggǎng Hángkōng
Yue: Cantonese
- Yale Romanization: Hēunggóng Hòhnghūng
- Jyutping: Hoeng1gong2 Hong4hung1

Hong Kong Airlines Limited (HKA), operating as Hong Kong Airlines (Chinese: 香港航空公司), is an airline based in Hong Kong, with its headquarters in the Tung Chung district and its main hub at Hong Kong International Airport. It was established in 2006 as a member of the HNA Group and flies to 25 destinations across Asia–Pacific.

== History ==
=== 2001–2006: Early years ===
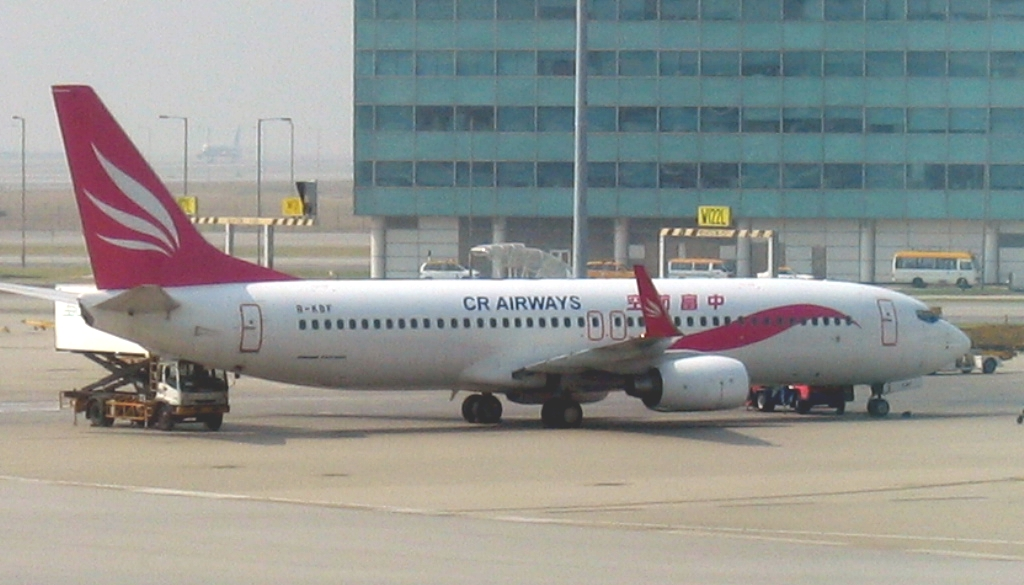
A CR Airways Boeing 737-800 in 2006

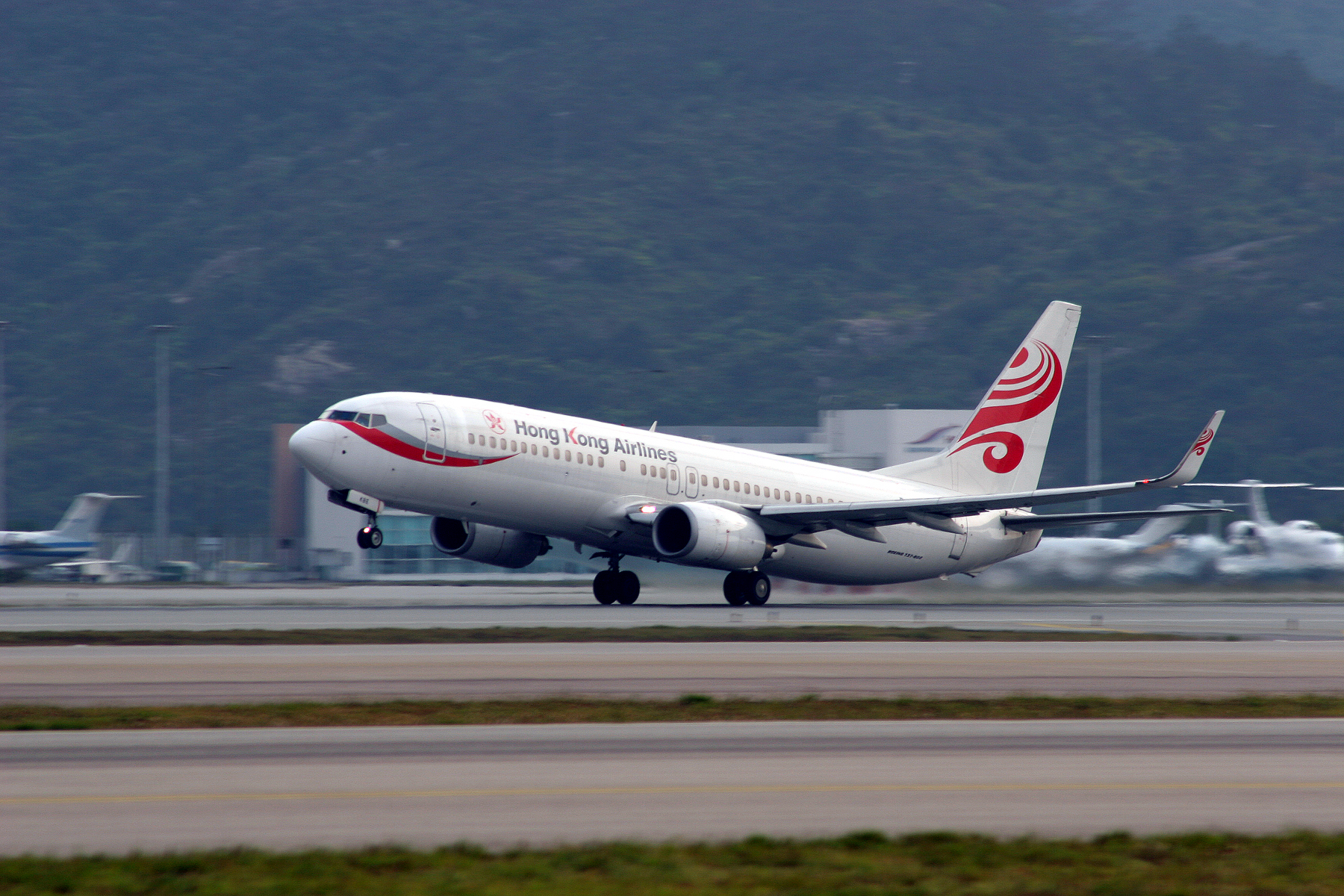
A Hong Kong Airlines Boeing 737-800 in 2007

Robert Yip (Chinese: 葉光), the chairman of China Rich Holdings, established CR Airways in Hong Kong on 28 March 2001. The airline received its air operator's certificate (AOC) from the Hong Kong Civil Aviation Department (CAD) in 2002, with its first aircraft a Sikorsky S-76C+ helicopter, which could carry 12 passengers and fly at 285 kilometres per hour (177 mph). It was Hong Kong's third commercial helicopter operator and the first helicopter operator to receive an AOC since Hong Kong became a special administrative region of China.

On 27 June 2003, CR Airways became Hong Kong's third passenger airline after receiving a revised AOC from the director-general of Civil Aviation. It operated its first passenger service the next day. It started passenger charter operations to Laoag, Philippines on 5 July 2003, with a Bombardier CRJ200 leased from GE Capital Aviation Services. In September 2003, the airline applied for traffic rights to operate scheduled passenger services to Laoag and the Chinese cities of Jinan, Naning, Meixian and Wenzhou. In addition, Yip sold 40% of the airline to his company, China Rich Holdings, for HK$180 million. By March 2004, the airline had added Siem Reap, Cambodia to its charter network.

In April 2005, the Hong Kong Air Transport Licensing Authority (ATLA) granted a five-year licence to transport passengers, cargo, and mail to China; the airline was free to apply for traffic rights to 10 cities in China. Then in July, the airline announced the imminent purchase of two Bombardier CRJ700s from Danish carrier Maersk Air. At the end of the year, a memorandum of understanding with Boeing for the purchase of 10 Boeing 787 Dreamliners and 30 Boeing 737-800s for US$3.28 billion took the business to the next level. Some of the aircraft were from a prior Hainan Airlines order.

=== 2006–2010: Change of ownership and fleet expansion ===
On 27 June 2006, Hainan Airlines secured a 45% holding in the airline by purchase of convertible notes held by Yu Ming Investments, which was to be injected into its new airline holding company, Grand China Air. Two months later, Mung Kin-keung (蒙建強) acquired the remaining 55% of the airline and became the controlling shareholder on 7 August and its director on 13 August. Mung's previous main business interest had been a 30% holding in a restaurant operator, Banana Leaf (Asia Pacific) Catering Group Company Ltd.

On 22 September 2006, CR Airways Ltd officially changed its name to Hong Kong Airlines Ltd, with a launch ceremony on 28 November 2006. The airline also introduced a new logo, which represents a bauhinia flower, the symbol of Hong Kong where the airline is anchored. The airline made the biggest aircraft order in its young history on 21 June 2007, ordering 51 narrow- and wide-body aircraft from European plane maker, Airbus, at an estimated value of US$5.6 billion. The airline's IATA code was changed from N8 to HX on 27 May 2007.

On 24 October 2008, in preparation for the arrival of the Airbus A330-200 wide-body aircraft, the airline announced plans to adjust personnel and fleet composition. The new aircraft was to provide medium-haul passenger and cargo services to the Middle East and Australia.

=== 2010–2012: Growth and expansion ===
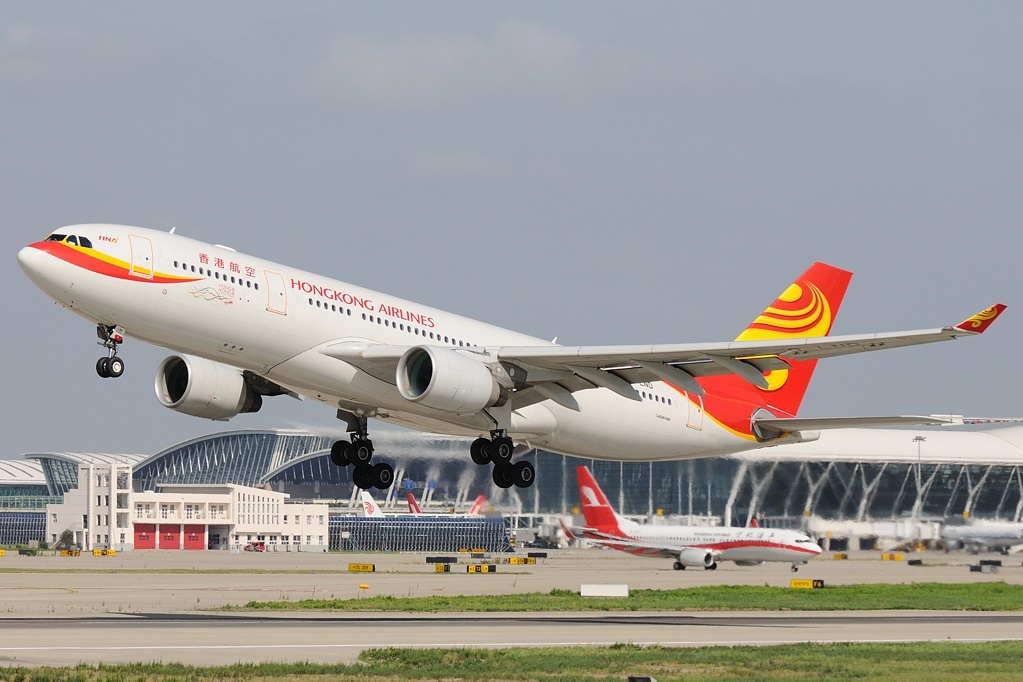
A Hong Kong Airlines Airbus A330-200

On 8 June 2010, Hong Kong Airlines completed their flight certification from Hong Kong to Beijing, earning an air operator's certificate for the Airbus A330 operations from the Hong Kong Civil Aviation Department. Scheduled flights to Moscow were launched later that month.

In September 2010, the airline introduced its first Airbus A330F cargo freighter, on a route from Hong Kong to Hangzhou. It officially joined the IATA the next month.

In 2011, Hong Kong Airlines was awarded a 4-star rating by Skytrax. Its passenger traffic exceeded one million, serving 19 destinations.

On 8 March 2012, the airline launched daily flights from Hong Kong to London Gatwick Airport with an Airbus A330-200 aircraft. It operated as an all-Club Class service, featuring 34 "Club Premier" (business class lie-flat beds) and 82 "Club Classic" (cradle style recliner business class) seats. The service lasted only six months.

=== 2012–2016: Repositioning ===
In 2013, Hong Kong Airlines concluded a system-wide strategy review to determine its priority routes for the immediate future with key focus areas on the Asia–Pacific region during this period. One new route was established when the Hong Kong–Maldives service was inaugurated. Total passenger traffic had reached over four million and the last of its Boeing aircraft were retired.

In 2014, Hong Kong Airlines launched new passenger routes between Hong Kong and Ho Chi Minh City, Tianjin and Kagoshima; they also increased daily flight frequency to Beijing and Shanghai. The airline's lounge service was relaunched as "Club Bauhinia" on 27 June 2014.

In February 2015, Hong Kong Airlines signed a sub-lease with the Airport Authority Hong Kong to develop a flight training center on a 0.6-hectare (1.5-acre) plot near the southeast perimeter of Hong Kong International Airport (HKIA). In March 2015, the airline joined the executive committee of the Board of Airline Representatives in Hong Kong (BAR HK), holding hands with another almost 80 airlines to improve the commercial and operational conditions for airlines active in Hong Kong. On 28 December 2015, Hong Kong Airlines flight HX658 bound for Okinawa became the first departure from the HKIA Midfield Concourse.

=== 2016–2018: Seeking intercontinental expansion ===
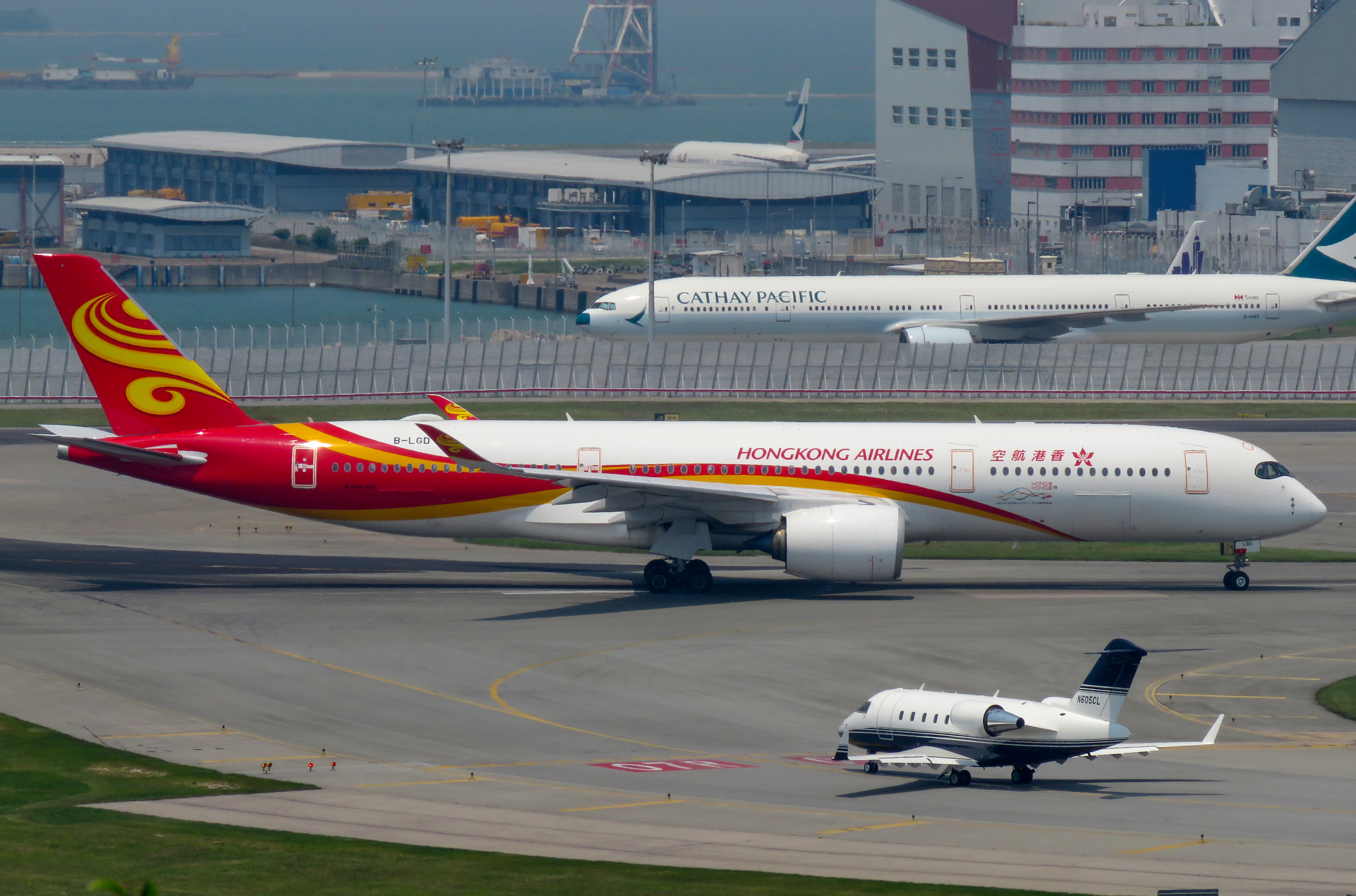
A Hong Kong Airlines Airbus A350-900

In April 2017, the firm's air cargo business in Hong Kong was set up as an independent subsidiary (Hong Kong Air Cargo), having received its operator's licence from the Hong Kong Civil Aviation Department. In June, Skytrax ranked Hong Kong Airlines as the second-best regional airline and 24th-best internationally. In August, Atlas Air announced that it had placed three 747-400 freighters with Hong Kong Air Cargo. The first aircraft was to enter service in September 2017, serving routes between the United States and Asia. Delivery of the remaining two aircraft was anticipated in 2018. All three aircraft were to be operated by Atlas Air on behalf of Hong Kong Air Cargo.

In September 2017, Hong Kong Airlines took delivery of its first Airbus A350-900, which shortly began service in a Bangkok (BKK) route. The company also launched its "Club Autus" VIP lounge at the HKIA Midfield Concourse. With the A350-900 aircraft, the airline began operating direct flights to Los Angeles on 18 December 2017, and to San Francisco three months later.

In December 2017, the company slogan was changed from Fresh + very Hong Kong to Where Hong Kong Begins.

=== 2018–present: Economic hardship and scaling back ===
In late 2018, a series of leaders resigned from the carrier's management, including its board's two co-chairmen Mung Kin-keung and Zhang Kui, its chief financial officer and vice-chairman, and at least four other directors. Hou Wei, who was vice-president and chief marketing officer at Hainan Airlines, later took over as chairman.

The attempted expansion was draining the company financially, and in March 2019, Hong Kong Airlines announced a cutback in its passenger fleet from 38 to 28 planes, and reduced services on some of its new international routes, including to Vancouver, San Francisco and Los Angeles.

In an attempt to roll back loss-making long-haul services in favour of more profitable Asian destinations, flights to Gold Coast and Cairns were suspended from October 2018, and the last Auckland flight departed for Hong Kong on 22 May 2019. HKA also discontinued its Fuzhou service in September 2019, while its San Francisco route was halted in October 2019 – less than two years after its launch in March 2018. In turn, the carrier increased the number of flights to three other short-haul destinations: Haikou, Hangzhou, and Sapporo.

By November 2019, HKA was facing severe financial difficulties due to the China–US trade war and 2019–2020 Hong Kong protests. It was reportedly unable to pay employees' salaries on time. The airline announced that it would end its remaining long-haul routes (to Los Angeles and Vancouver) starting February 2020, thus becoming a purely regional airline. It also announced the termination of its in-flight entertainment system from 1 December 2019 to cut costs.

The onset of the COVID-19 pandemic in early 2020 further worsened HKA's financial crisis. On 7 February 2020, the airline announced that it was cutting 400 positions (equivalent to 10% of its workforce), mainly pilots and cabin crew. It also asked remaining staff to take two months of unpaid leave, or to switch to a three-day work week. On 18 February, HKA announced that it would suspend in-flight services such as food, drinks, pillows, and blankets to protect customers and crew during the pandemic. However, this was later reported to be "a desperate attempt to cut costs" as the airline faced a potential collapse. The following day, the airline announced that it would lay off an additional 170 employees, mostly cabin crew.

In June 2021, Hong Kong Airlines announced that it would ground its entire fleet of Airbus A320s, leaving only eight A330s flying in the interim and prioritising cargo, as part of its pandemic-survival plan. The plan also called for hundreds more jobs to be cut.

Hong Kong Airlines has resumed their flights to Hakodate, Denpasar, Maldives, Saipan and Taichung, Taiwan due to the boost of travelling markets.

On 22 August 2024, HKA Chairman Jeff Sun announced that Hong Kong Airlines would recommence the flights to Gold Coast in January 2025. At the mean time, Sun claimed they will import three used Boeing 787s from its parent company Hainan Airlines to the long-haul flights from Hong Kong to Canada and the United States re-introducing back in 2025; since the fleet of Airbus A350 had been sold in 2023.

On 21 November 2024, Chairman of Hong Kong Airlines, Yan Bo was reported to have told Hong Kong-based media that the airline is in plans of acquiring Comac C919 aircraft following 12 months of sustained fleet growth (from 21 to 30 aircraft over 2024) and the resumption of long-haul flights especially to North America. The airline was expected to have 5 million passengers in year 2024. On 28 November 2024, it was reported that Hong Kong Airline will resume its long haul services with the resumption of routes to Gold Coast, Australia and Vancouver, Canada beginning 17 January 2025.

In the future, Hong Kong Airlines will no longer use standard livery with the logo and details related to HNA Aviation. Instead, It's will be launched a brand new livery to represent the "blooming Bauhinia flower" without the HNA Aviation logo.

In 2025, Hong Kong Airlines continued expanding its network following the resumption of long-haul operations. In June, the airline announced plans to launch a new service to Urumqi in Xinjiang in August and a service to Melbourne later in the year. The expansion followed the resumption of services to the Gold Coast and Vancouver earlier in 2025 and formed part of the airline's wider network expansion. In July, Hong Kong Airlines confirmed that the Melbourne service would begin in December 2025, operating three times weekly with Airbus A330 aircraft.

== Corporate affairs ==
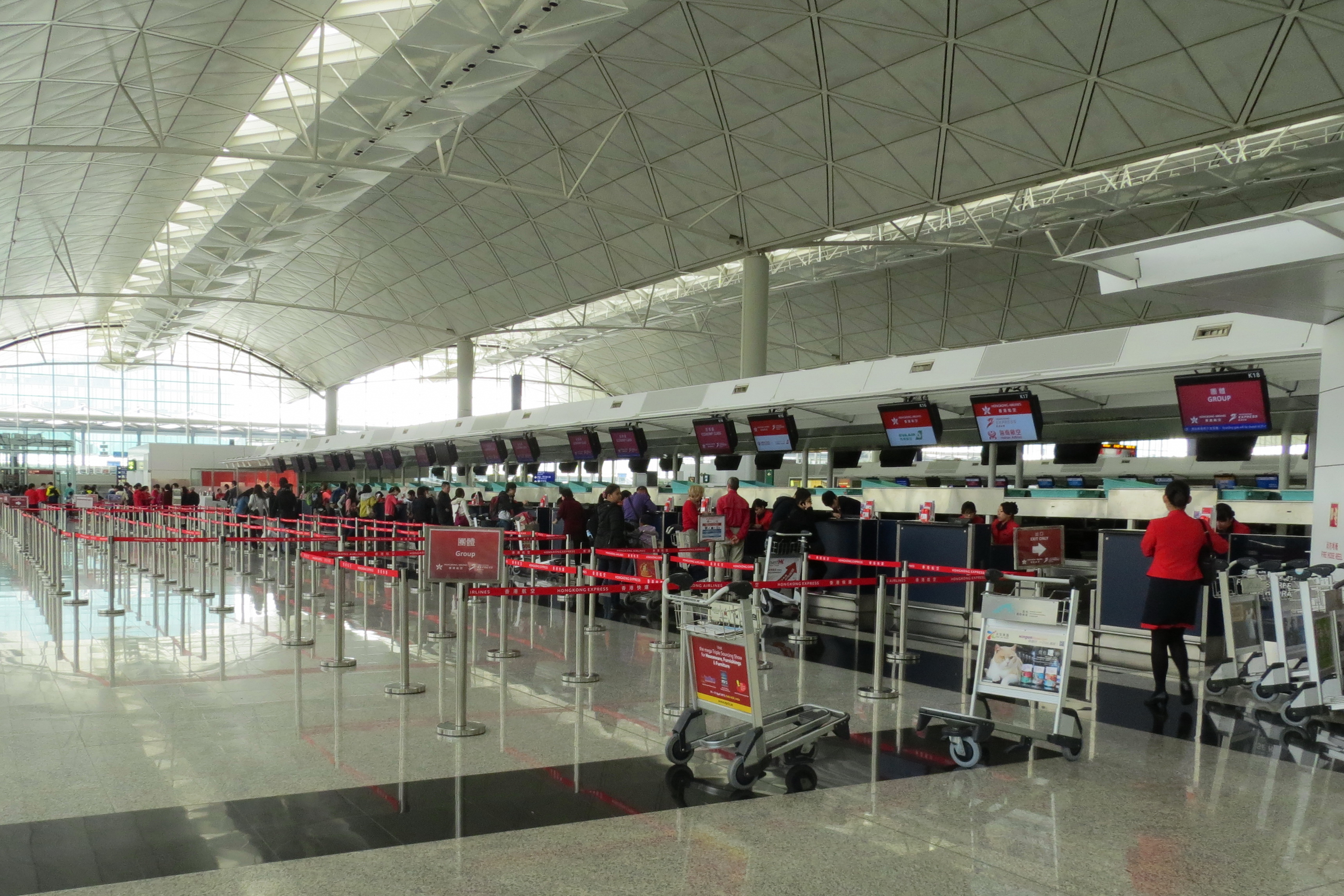
Hong Kong Airlines check-in counters at their hub Hong Kong International Airport

=== Ownership ===
It was acquired in 2006 by Hainan Airlines, actually controlled by the State-owned Assets Commission of Hainan Province (2006–2021) and subsequently the Liaoning Fangda Group (2021–). The company had a legal battle over corporate ownership in 2019.

=== Headquarters ===
The airline's head office is located in Tung Chung, close to Hong Kong International Airport.

=== Subsidiaries ===
SATS Hong Kong Ltd. (SATS HK) is a joint venture with SATS Ltd. which provides passenger self-handling and ramp services at Hong Kong International Airport and HKA Holidays Ltd. (HKA Holidays) offers travel products, including fixed charter flight tickets, tour packages, and hotel accommodation.

=== Community engagement ===
In 2015, Hong Kong Airlines was selected as the Official Carrier for the Hong Kong Paralympic Committee and the Sports Association for the Physically Disabled. The airline has joined the Caritas Fund Raising Bazaar for six consecutive years from 2009 and sponsored Hong Kong events marking the "World Diabetes Day 2012". The airline also has many student sponsorship and aviation education programs, including its "Triumph Sky High" Junior Program, "Embrace the World" Student Sponsorship Program and "School Sharing Workshops".

=== Loyalty programme ===
A frequent flyer program, the Fortune Wings Club, is operated by Hong Kong Airlines and its sister airlines Grand China Air, Grand China Express, Hainan Airlines and Lucky Air. Membership benefits include air ticket redemption and upgrade; dedicated First or Business Class check-in counters, Club Autus and Club Bauhinia lounge access, bonus mileage and extra baggage allowance.

=== Cabin services ===
==== Business class ====
Business class on A330 which operate for long-haul and selected regional flights (Bangkok, Beijing, Osaka, Shanghai, Tokyo; and Fukuoka, Sapporo, Taipei seasonal) has 180-degree flat beds and direct aisle access. Passengers may use two business lounges: Club Autus and Club Bauhinia. They can also earn Fortune Wing Points, depending on their fare class.

==== Economy class ====
Economy class seats on the A330s feature personal televisions (PTV). On selected short-haul flights, passengers are given inflight intranet access through Wi-Fi network which serve as an in-flight entertainment system including video-on-demand.

== Destinations ==
Hong Kong Airlines serves 40 destinations (including cargo), but not including codeshare.

=== Codeshare agreements ===
Hong Kong Airlines codeshares with the following airlines:

- Asiana Airlines
- Bangkok Airways
- Chu Kong Passenger Transport
- Etihad Airways
- EVA Air
- Garuda Indonesia
- Grand China Air
- Hainan Airlines
- TurboJET
- Royal Brunei Airlines
- Turkish Airlines
- WestJet

== Fleet ==
=== Current fleet ===
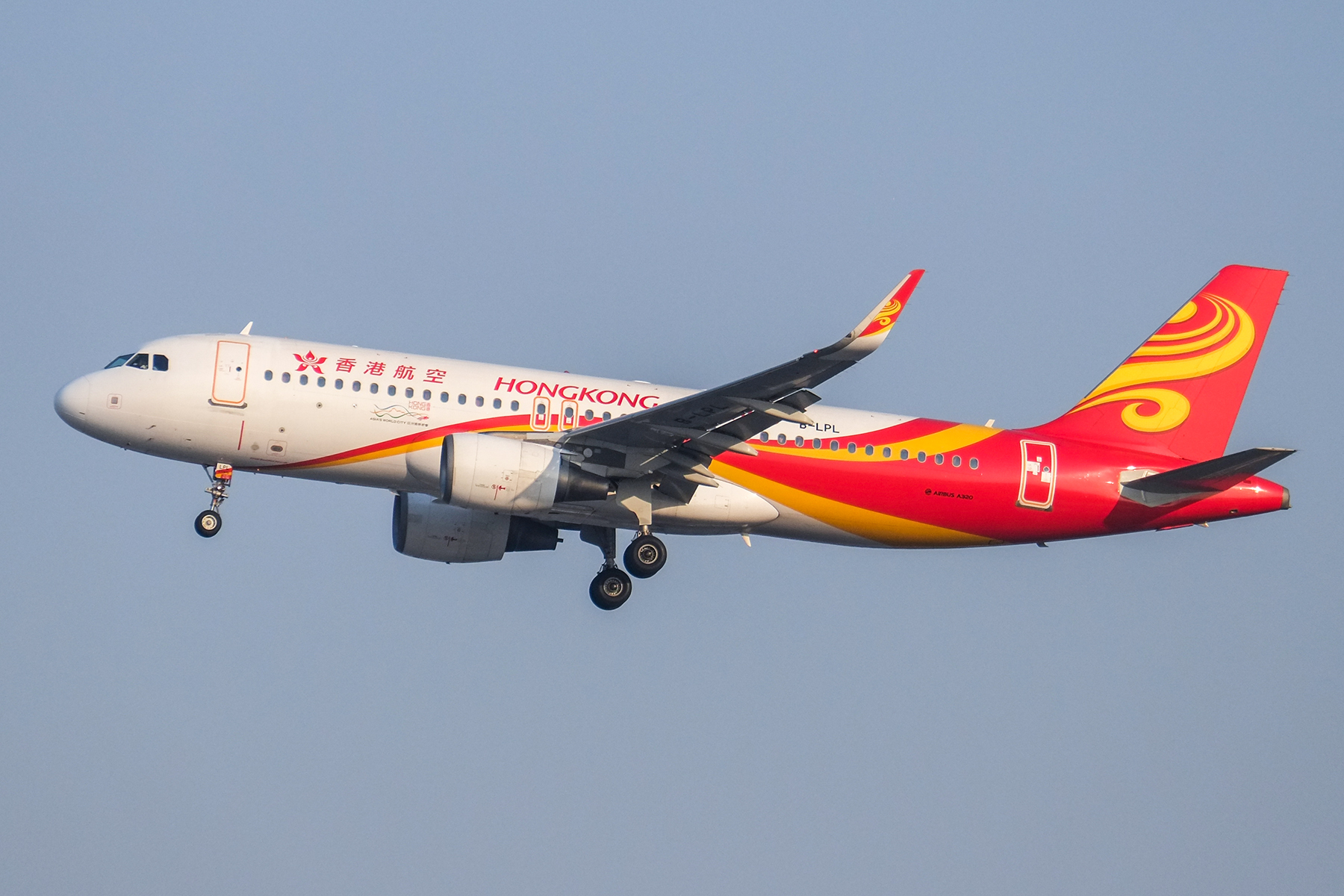
Airbus A320-200

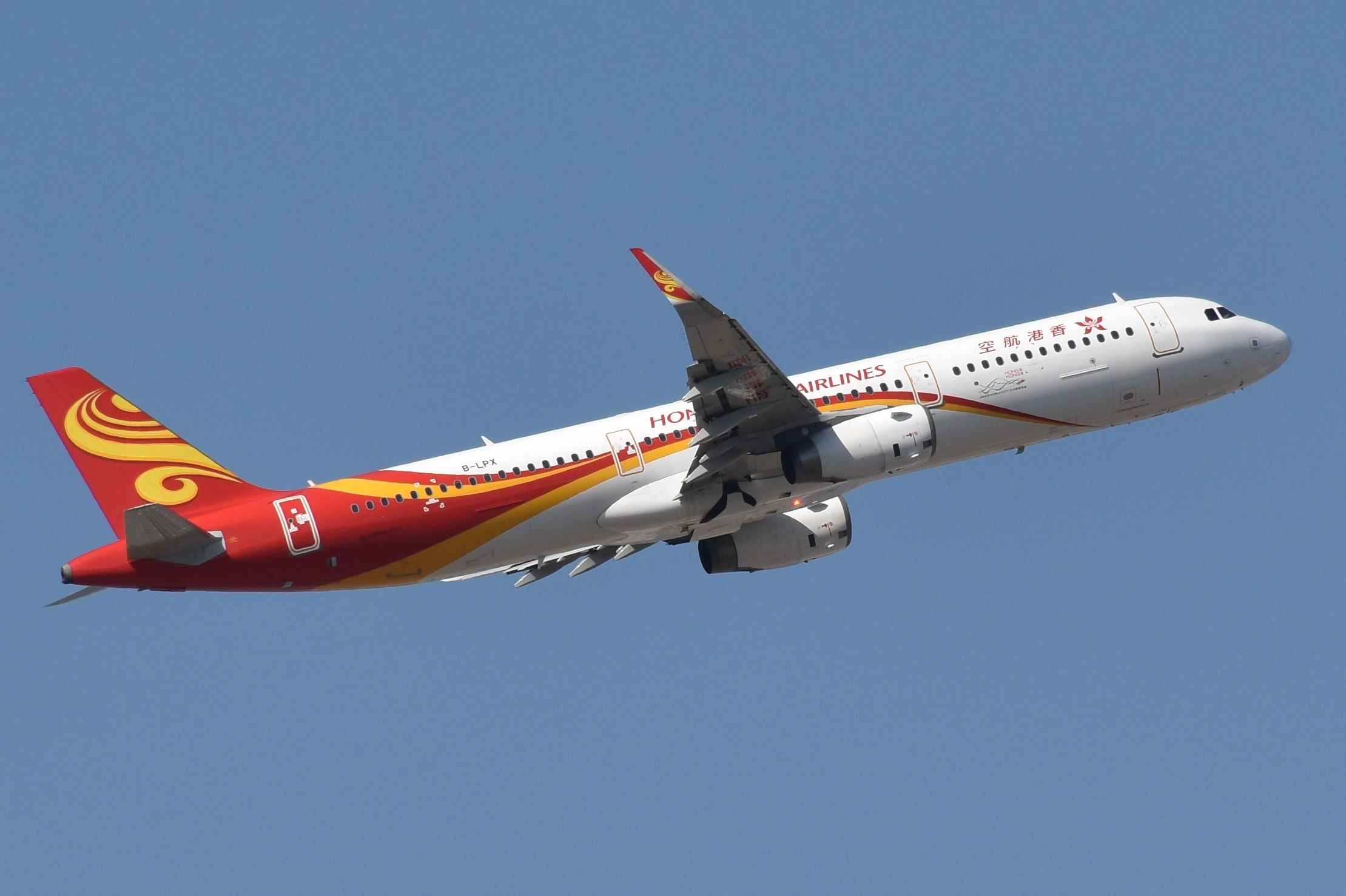
Airbus A321-200

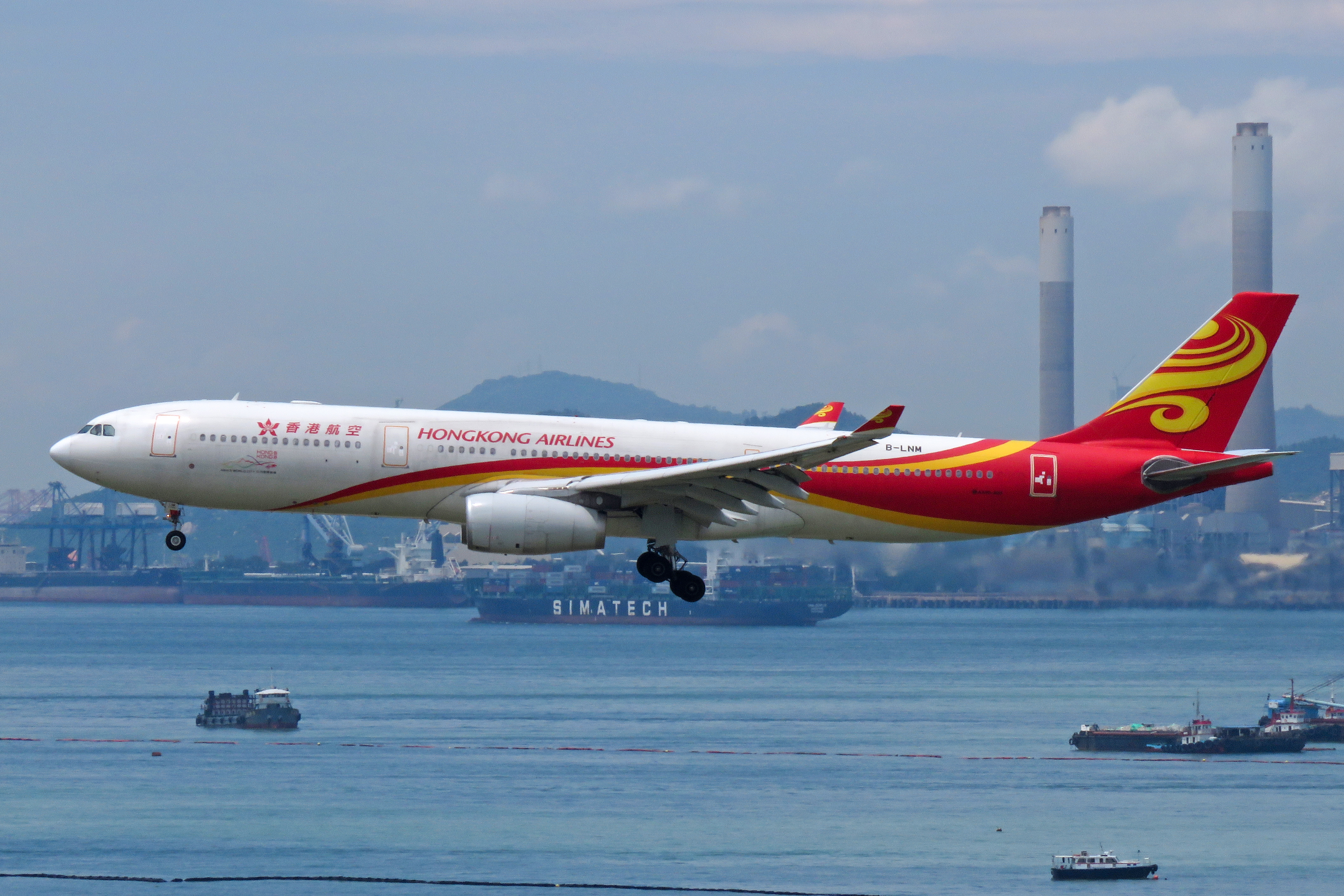
Airbus A330-300

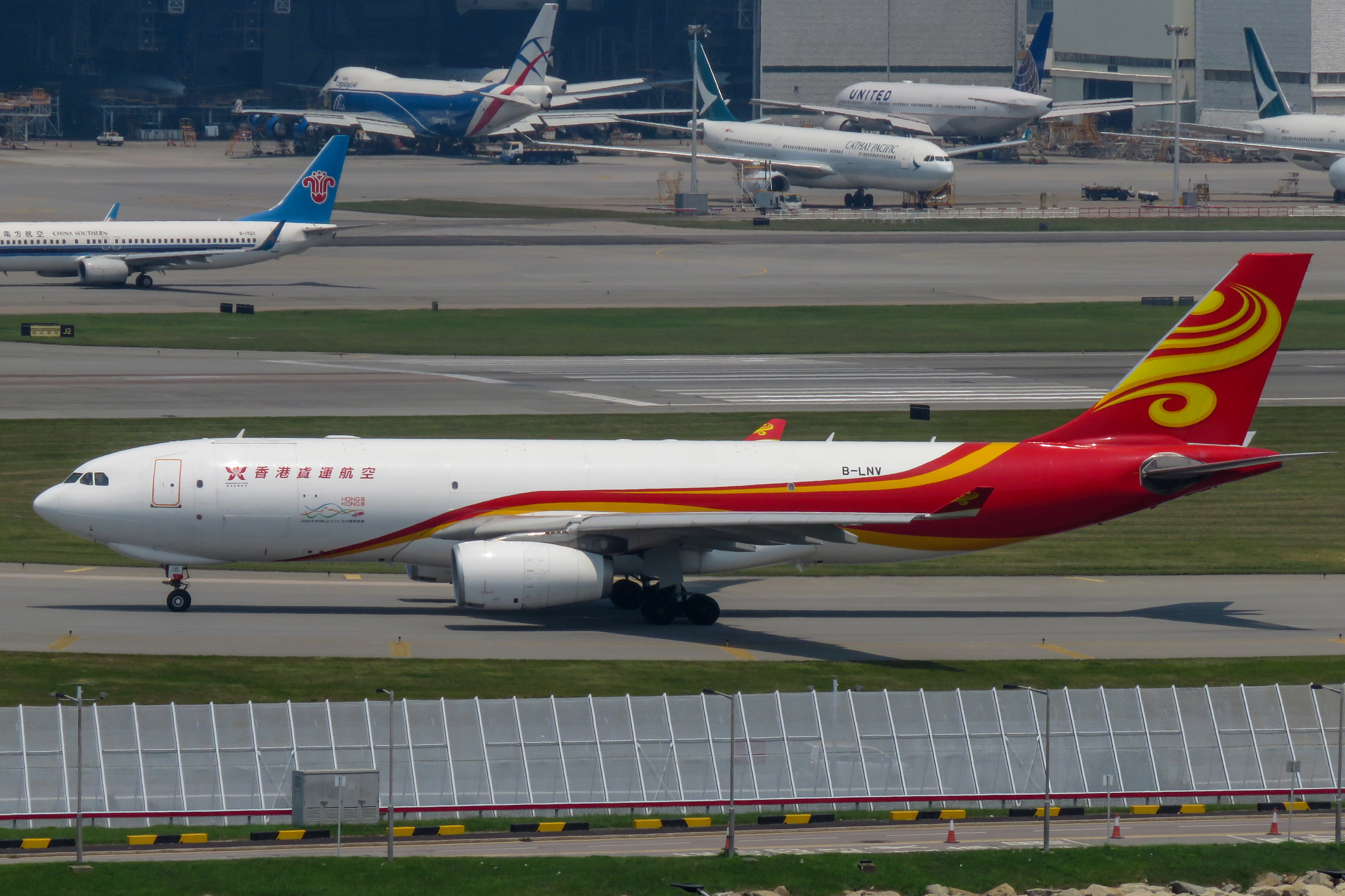
Airbus A330-200F (Cargo)

As of July 2026, Hong Kong Airlines operates the following aircraft:

Hong Kong Airlines fleet
Aircraft	In Service	Orders	Passengers			Notes
Aircraft	In Service	Orders	C	Y	Total	Notes
Airbus A320-200	17	—	8	144	152	
Airbus A320-200	17	—	8	150	158	
Airbus A320-200	17	—	—	174	174	
Airbus A320-200	17	—	—	180	180	
Airbus A321-200	3	—	—	220	220	
Airbus A330-300	7	—	30	255	285	
Airbus A330-300	7	—	32	260	292	
Airbus A330-300	7	—	24	279	303	
Cargo Fleet
Airbus A330-200F	6	—	Cargo			
Total	33	—				

== Accidents and incidents ==
- On 13 June 2012, Hong Kong Airlines flight 337, operated by an Airbus A330-200 (registered B-LNC) from Beijing to Hong Kong, was climbing out of Beijing when they encountered problems with the plane's fuel system. This resulted in a return to Beijing 40 minutes after departure. The plane was not able to be repaired immediately and passengers were provided alternate arrangements. The incident aircraft was returned to Hong Kong 12 hours later as HX313.
- On 17 August 2012, Hong Kong Airlines flight 235, operated by an Airbus A330-200 (registered B-LNF) from Shanghai, Pudong to Hong Kong, landed on runway 07L but became disabled due to flat tyres induced by a high speed turn off at A7. Runway 07L was closed for over 2 hours before the plane could be removed. The passengers were disembarked via air stairs and bussed to the terminal.

== See also ==
- List of airlines of Hong Kong
- List of airports in Hong Kong
- List of companies of Hong Kong
- Transport in Hong Kong
