= Air Hong Kong =

Cargo airline owned by Cathay Pacific

AHK Air Hong Kong Limited 香港華民航空

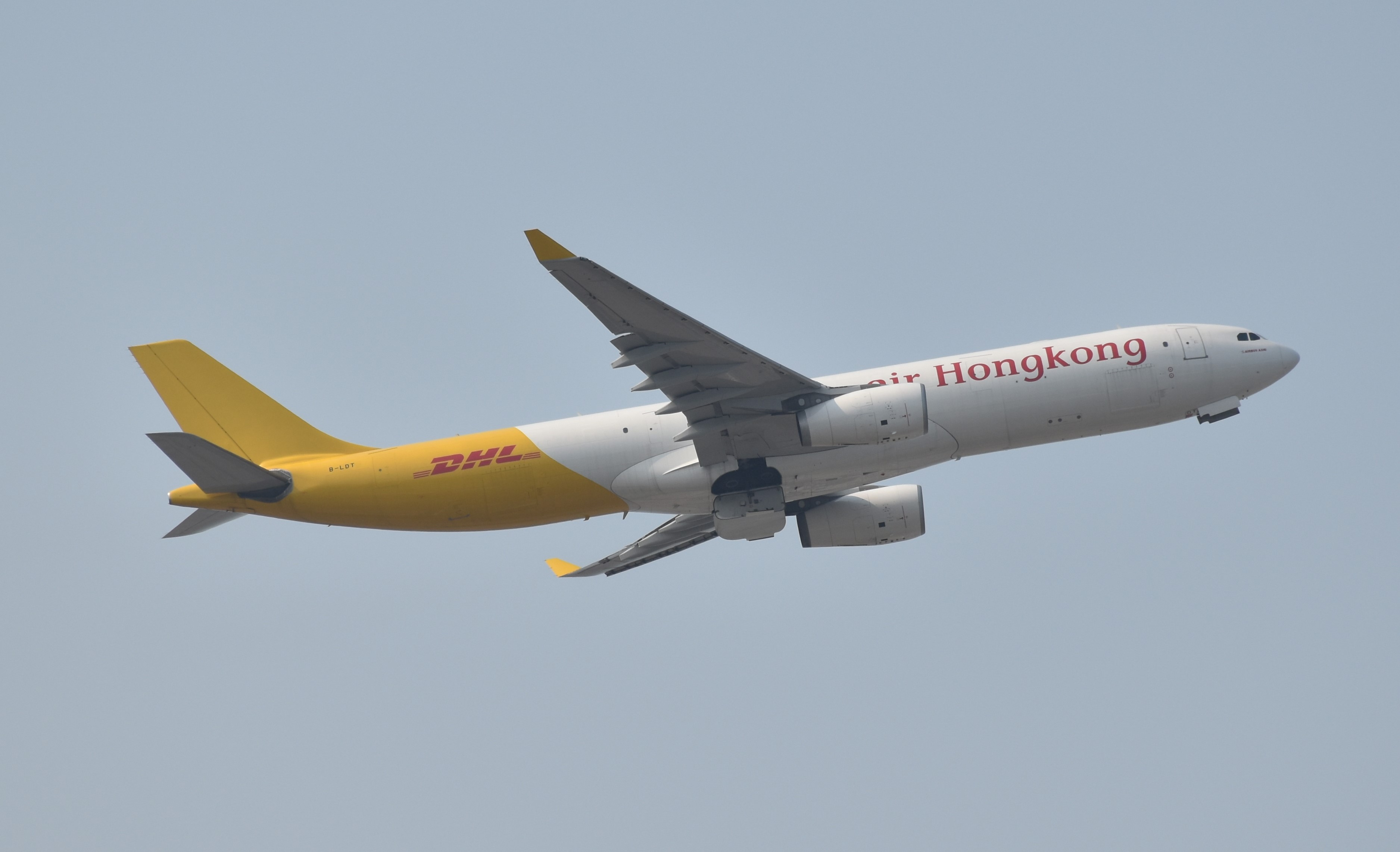
IATA	ICAO	Call sign
LD	AHK	AIR HONG KONG
- Founded: November 1986; 40 years ago
- Commenced operations: 4 February 1988; 38 years ago
- AOC #: 6
- Hubs: Hong Kong International Airport
- Fleet size: 14
- Destinations: 15
- Parent company: Cathay Pacific
- Headquarters: Hong Kong
- Key people: Alex McGowan (Chair); Agatha Lee (COO); Gavin Haslemore (Director of Flight Operations)
- Website: airhongkong.com.hk

Air Hong Kong
- Traditional Chinese: 香港華民航空
- Simplified Chinese: 香港华民航空
- Literal meaning: Hong Kong Chinese people Airline
Transcriptions
Standard Mandarin
- Hanyu Pinyin: Xiānggǎng Huámín Hángkōng
Yue: Cantonese
- Jyutping: hoeng1 gong2 waa4 man4 hong4 hung1

Air Hong Kong (stylised as air Hongkong) is an all-cargo airline based in Chek Lap Kok, Hong Kong, with its main hub at Hong Kong International Airport. The airline operates an express freight network to 13 destinations in nine countries, including China, Japan, Malaysia, Philippines, Taiwan, Singapore, South Korea, Thailand and Vietnam. It has a fleet of Airbus A330-300P2F freighters.

Air Hong Kong was founded in November 1986 by three local businessmen and commenced charter services with a Boeing 707-320C freighter on 4 February 1988. In June 1994, Hong Kong's largest carrier, Cathay Pacific acquired a 75% shareholding, acquiring the remaining 25% in February 2002. In October, Cathay Pacific entered into a joint venture with DHL, that eventually saw DHL take a 40% stake in the airline, with Cathay Pacific retained the other 60%.

In 2017, Cathay Pacific entered into an agreement with DHL for Cathay Pacific to buy back the 40% shareholding. This was completed at the end of 2018, with Air Hong Kong again wholly owned subsidiary of Cathay Pacific. Air Hong Kong continues to operate an agreed freighter network to destinations in Asia for DHL.

== History ==
Old Air Hong Kong logo

Air Hong Kong was established as a charter operator in November 1986 by three local businessmen from London's Stansted Airport, which included Roger Walman who teamed up with Tomas Sang from Hong Kong to help fund the business. The airline commenced charter services with a Boeing 707-320C freighter on 4 February 1988, to Bombay, Britain and Kathmandu; and scheduled services began on 18 October 1989. The airline had been struggling for profits. It was rescued by businessman Stanley Ho in late 1989. It was 80% controlled by Shun Tak and the remaining 20% owned indirectly by Ho. By early 1990, the airline had two Boeing 707-320C and operated a scheduled cargo service to Manchester, with traffic rights to Auckland, Brussels, Fukuoka, Guam, Melbourne, Nagoya, Osaka, Perth, Busan, Singapore, Sydney, Vienna and Zürich. Schedule cargo service to Nagoya was introduced and new traffic rights to Hanoi and Ho Chi Minh City granted by April 1991. In March 1992, Air Hong Kong was granted additional traffic rights to Cairns, Darwin, Dhaka, Dubai, Kathmandu, Kuala Lumpur and Townsville. By March 1993, the airline operated scheduled cargo services to Brussels, Dubai, Ho Chi Minh City, Manchester, Nagoya and Singapore with a fleet of two Boeing 747-100SF and one Boeing 707-320C freighters.

Polaris Aircraft Leasing, a subsidiary of GE Capital, entered into agreement in 1993 to suspend lease payments on the airline's three Boeing 747-100SFs in return for an option to buy up to 49 percent of the airline in January 1995. However, Cathay Pacific acquired 75 percent of the airline's shares for HK$200 million in June 1994 and the option was cancelled. Facing weak demands and heavy financial losses, the airline was forced to terminate the lease on its Boeing 707-320C and one of its Boeing 747-100SF in November 1994 and January 1995, respectively, with only two Boeing 747-100SFs remaining. By 2000, the airline had a fleet of three Boeing 747-200Fs with scheduled cargo services to Brussels, Dubai, Manchester and Osaka.

The airline's parent, Cathay Pacific, acquired the remaining 25 percent of the airline's shares in February 2002 and became a wholly owned subsidiary. An operational restructure followed on 1 July, where Air Hong Kong ceased services to Brussels, Dubai and Manchester to focus on services in Asia. In October 2002, Cathay Pacific entered into a joint venture agreement with DHL by selling a 30 percent stake in the cargo airline in exchange for funds to purchase medium-size freighters to operate DHL's network in the Asia-Pacific region from Hong Kong. The airline set aside $300 million to purchase five freighters by 2004 and another $100 million towards at least three more freighters by 2010. In March 2003, Cathay Pacific sold another 10 percent stake to DHL and retained 60 percent of the airline.

Air Hong Kong was the launch customer for the Airbus A300-600F General Freighter, which is a new variant of the Airbus A300-600F. This new variant has a cargo loading system capable of handling virtually every type of container and pallet, and a side door at the rear of the lower deck capable of handling large items of general freight. The airline took its first delivery of this new aircraft in September 2004, with the eighth and final aircraft delivered on 22 June 2006. The new freighters were powered by two General Electric (GE) CF6-80C2 engines and signed a 14-year Maintenance Cost Per Hour (MCPH) programme with GE on 25 January 2005.

In November 2007, Air Hong Kong received an Award for Operational Excellence by the aircraft manufacturer Airbus for achieving an overall best performance on aircraft utilisation, operational reliability and average delay time.

In 2017, Cathay Pacific took full ownership of the airline, acquiring DHL's 40% stake.

== Destinations ==
Air Hong Kong operates cargo flights to the following destinations as of 29 October 2023:

Country	City	Airport	Notes
China	Beijing	Beijing Capital International Airport	
China	Chengdu	Chengdu Shuangliu International Airport	
China	Shanghai	Shanghai Pudong International Airport	
Hong Kong	Hong Kong	Hong Kong International Airport	Hub
Japan	Nagoya	Chubu Centrair International Airport	
Japan	Osaka	Kansai International Airport	
Japan	Tokyo	Narita International Airport	
Malaysia	Penang	Penang International Airport	
Philippines	Cebu	Mactan–Cebu International Airport	
Philippines	Manila	Ninoy Aquino International Airport	
Singapore	Singapore	Changi Airport	
South Korea	Seoul	Incheon International Airport	
Taiwan	Taipei	Taoyuan International Airport	
Thailand	Bangkok	Suvarnabhumi Airport	
Vietnam	Ho Chi Minh City	Tan Son Nhat International Airport	

== Fleet ==
=== Current fleet ===
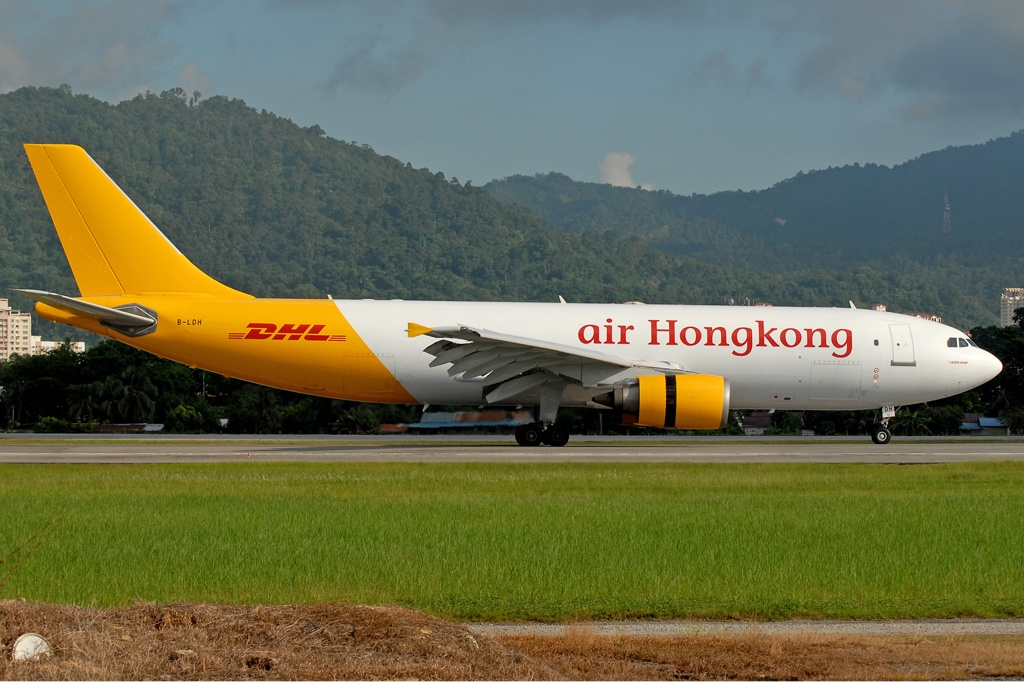
Former Air Hong Kong Airbus A300-600F General Freighter (B-LDH)

As of July 2026, Air Hong Kong operates the following aircraft:

Air Hong Kong fleet
Aircraft	In service	Orders	Notes
Airbus A330-200F	4	—	Operated for DHL Aviation.
Airbus A330-300/P2F	10	—	Operated for DHL Aviation.
Total	14	—	

In 2020, Air Hong Kong transferred a second A330F to its own air operator's certificate. While the first was a freighter-converted A330-322F, the latest is a production A330-243F. The airline was the launch customer for the Airbus A300-600F General Freighter, which was the new variant of the Airbus A300-600F.

=== Former fleet ===
As of August 2025, Air Hong Kong operated 4 Airbus A330-200F and 10 Airbus A330-300P2F.

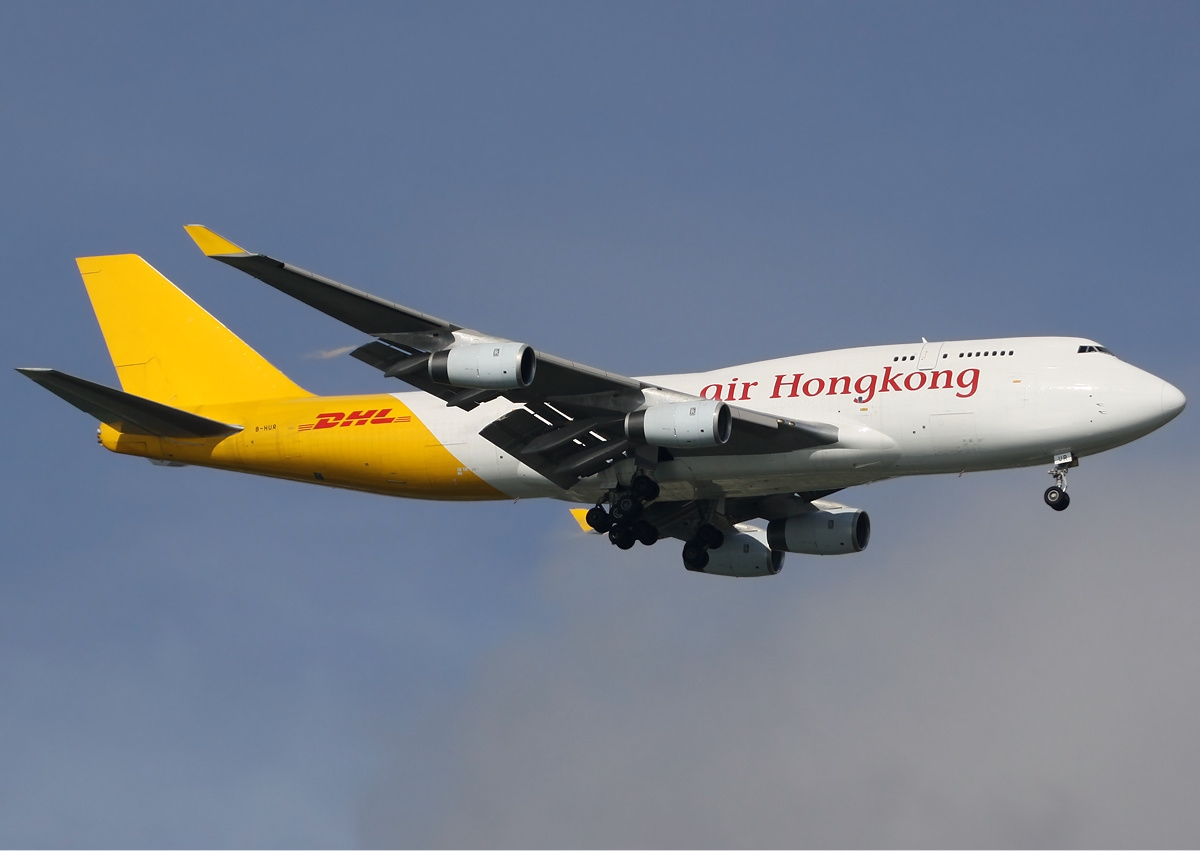
A retired Air Hong Kong Boeing 747-400F

Aircraft	Total	Introduced	Retired	Notes
Airbus A300-600F	15	2002	2025	
Boeing 707-320C	Unknown	1988	1998	
Boeing 727-200F	Unknown	Unknown	Unknown	
Boeing 747-100SF	4	1991	1996	
Boeing 747-200F	1	1994	1996	
Boeing 747-200SF	3	1997	2004	
Boeing 747-400BCF	4	2011	2018	
