= Air Premia =

Budget airline of South Korea

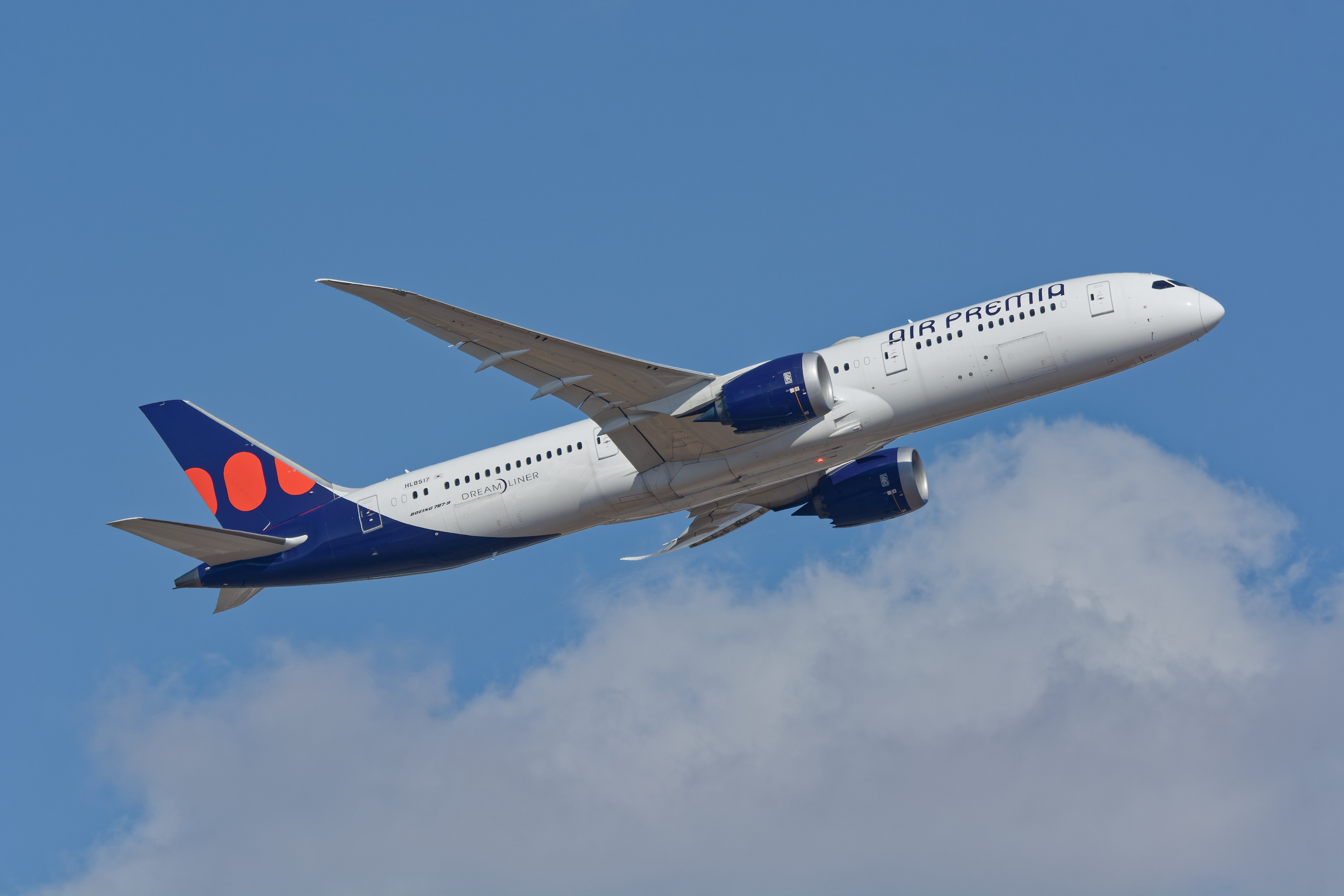
- Air Premia Boeing 787-9
IATA	ICAO	Call sign
YP	APZ	AIR PREMIA
- Founded: July 27, 2017; 9 years ago
- Commenced operations: August 11, 2021; 5 years ago
- Hubs: Incheon International Airport
- Frequent-flyer program: Premia Members
- Fleet size: 9
- Destinations: 12
- Headquarters: Seoul, South Korea
- Key people: Yoo Myung-sub (CEO)
- Founder: Kim Jong-chul
- Website: airpremia.com

Air Premia, Inc. (Korean: 에어프레미아) is a South Korean airline based in Seoul. It describes itself as a "hybrid airline", providing a higher level of service than low-cost airlines while having lower operating costs than larger, full-service airlines. The airline was founded in 2017 by the former president of Jeju Air, Kim Jong-chul.

== History ==
Air Premia was established on July 27, 2017, by the ex-president of Jeju Air, Kim Jong-chul. In April 2019, the airline intended to launch in 2020 and lease three Boeing 787-9s from Air Lease Corporation (ALC), but later announced that it had agreed to purchase five. The airline was initially expected to launch with regional routes within Asia, but later intended to operate long-haul routes to Europe and the United States.

In April 2021, Air Premia received its first Boeing 787-9, with plans to operate 10 aircraft by the end of 2024. On August 11, 2021, the airline celebrated its inauguration of flights with a domestic service between Seoul and Jeju. Domestic services ended on October 30, 2021, as the airline prepared to transition to exclusively operating international routes. These consisted of a mix of scheduled, chartered, passenger, and dedicated cargo services to destinations in Asia, Europe, and North America.

== Destinations ==
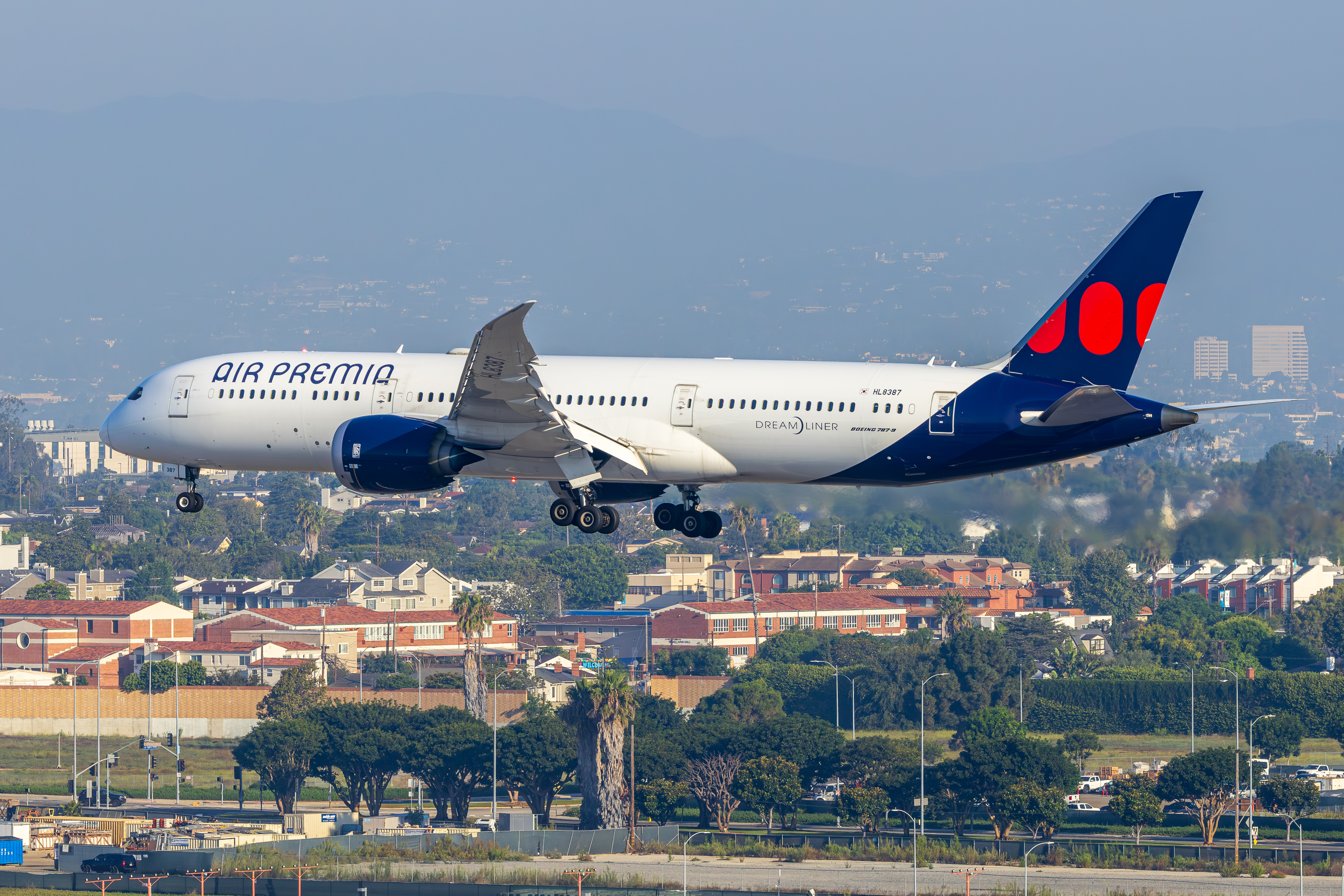
Air Premia Boeing 787-9 HL8387 landing at Los Angeles International Airport, 2023

As of April 2025, Air Premia operates or has operated to the following destinations:

Country	City	Airport	Start date	End date	Notes	Refs
Bangladesh	Dhaka	Hazrat Shahjalal International Airport	3 October 2023	Present	Charter	
Germany	Frankfurt	Frankfurt Airport	27 June 2023	30 December 2023	Terminated	
Hong Kong	Hong Kong	Hong Kong International Airport	24 January 2025	Present		
Japan	Sapporo	New Chitose Airport	2 December 2026	Future	Begins 2 December 2026	
Japan	Tokyo	Narita International Airport	23 December 2022	Present		
Norway	Oslo	Oslo Airport, Gardermoen	11 May 2023	Present	Charter	
Singapore	Singapore	Changi Airport	24 December 2021	26 October 2023	Terminated	
South Korea	Jeju	Jeju International Airport	11 August 2021	30 October 2021	Terminated	
South Korea	Seoul	Gimpo International Airport	11 August 2021	30 October 2021	Terminated	
South Korea	Seoul	Incheon International Airport	24 December 2021	Present	Hub	
Spain	Barcelona	Josep Tarradellas Barcelona–El Prat Airport	11 September 2023	Present	Charter	
Thailand	Bangkok	Suvarnabhumi Airport	11 March 2022	Present		
Turkey	Ankara	Ankara Esenboğa Airport	27 August 2022	12 November 2022	Terminated	
United States	Honolulu	Daniel K. Inouye International Airport	11 December 2023; 2 July 2025	4 March 2024; Present		
United States	Los Angeles	Los Angeles International Airport	15 October 2022	Present		
United States	Newark	Newark Liberty International Airport	22 May 2023	Present		
United States	San Francisco	San Francisco International Airport	17 May 2024	Present		
United States	Washington, D.C.	Dulles International Airport	24 April 2026	Present		
Vietnam	Da Nang	Da Nang International Airport	23 January 2025	Present		
Vietnam	Ho Chi Minh City	Tan Son Nhat International Airport	12 January 2022; 5 November 2026	29 October 2023; Future	Resuming soon	

=== Interline agreements ===
Air Premia has interlining agreements with the following airlines:

- Alaska Airlines
- Korean Air
- Thai Airways International
- Trinity Airways

== Fleet ==
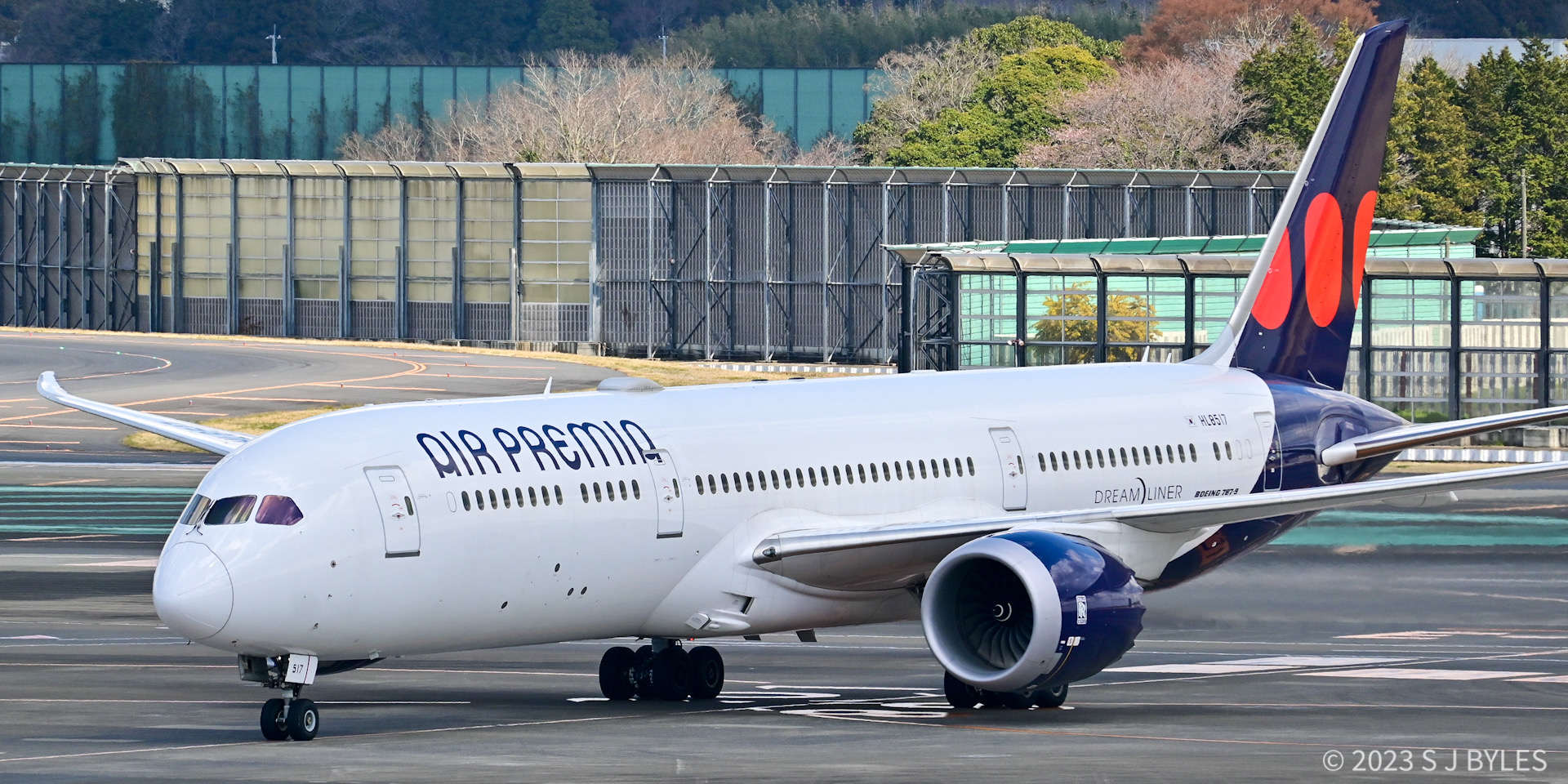
Air Premia Boeing 787-9 at Narita International Airport in Tokyo

As of July 2026, Air Premia operates the following aircraft:

Air Premia fleet
Aircraft	In service	Orders	Passengers			Notes
Aircraft	In service	Orders	W	Y	Total	Notes
Boeing 787-9	9	—	56	253	309	Deliveries through 2025.
Boeing 787-9	9	—	56	264	320	Deliveries through 2025.
Boeing 787-9	9	—	35	291	326	Deliveries through 2025.
Boeing 787-9	9	—	35	309	344	To be re-configured to a 326-seat configuration.
Total	9	—				

=== Fleet development ===
Air Premia's initial fleet was planned to consist of three Boeing 787-9s, but this was later increased to five. In early 2024, Air Premia planned to increase its fleet with an additional four 787-9s to be leased from Korean Air starting later in 2024, as part of addressing competition concerns with Korean Air's proposed merger with Asiana Airlines.

Near the end of 2025, the airline considered adding Airbus widebodies in response to delays in 787 deliveries, in addition to an evaluation of shifting toward narrowbodies to morph to a hub-and-spoke network model.

=== Former fleet ===
As of June 2025, Air Premia operated 9 Boeing 787-9.

== Service concept ==
Air Premia operates two cabins and classes of service on its aircraft, consisting of a premium economy cabin (branded as Premia 42) consisting of 56 seats in a 2–3–2 layout, and an economy cabin (branded as Economy 35) consisting of seats in a 3–3–3 layout, with the numbers in the branding reflecting their respective seat pitch in inches. In contrast to low-cost carriers, Air Premia includes various services complimentarily rather than imposing additional fees for them, such as baggage allowances, in-flight catering, and in-flight entertainment. However, the airline still provides some buy on board services, such as for duty-free sales and Wi-Fi access.
