= Incheon International Airport =

Main airport serving Seoul, South Korea

Incheon International Airport 인천국제공항

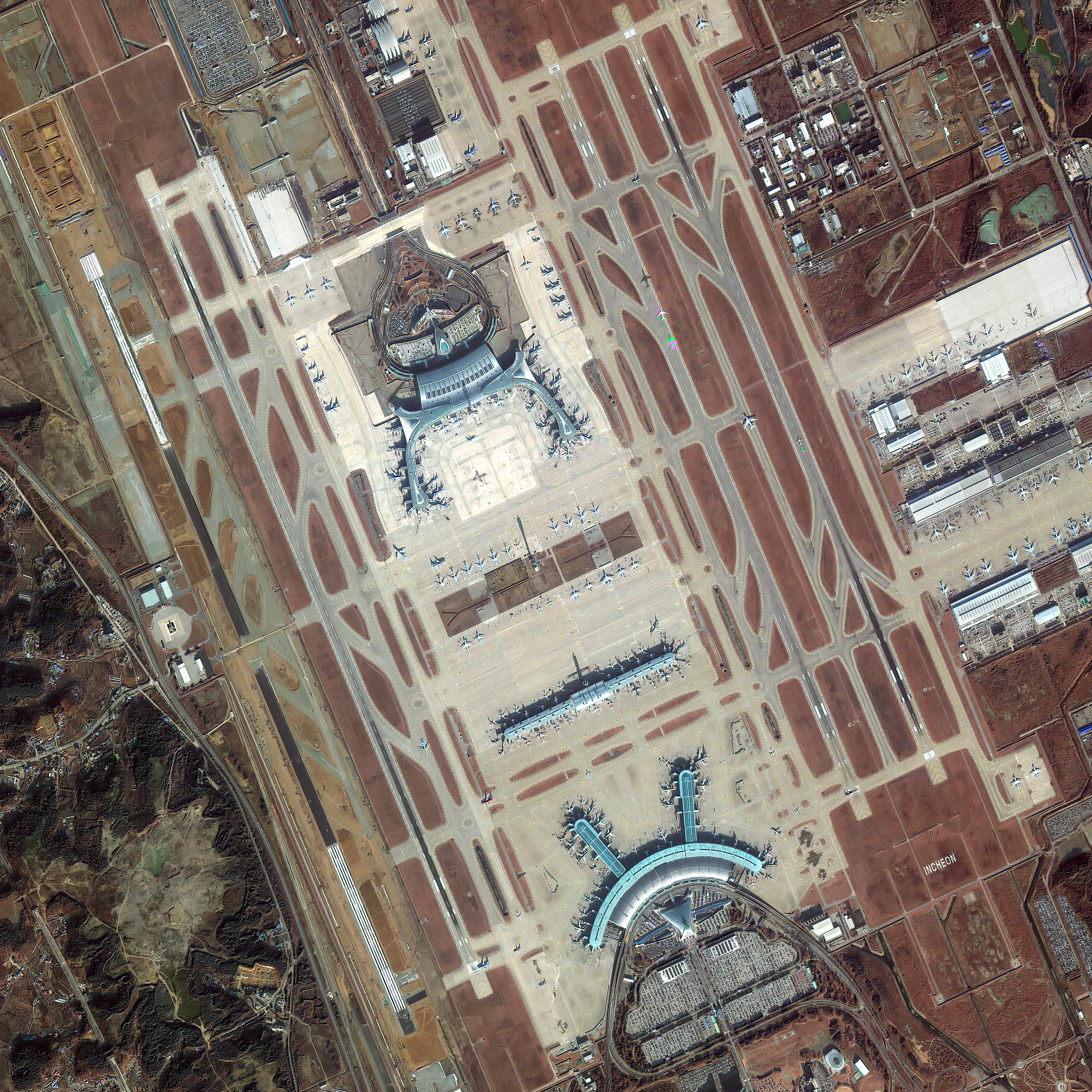
- Aerial view of Incheon International Airport in 2020
- IATA: ICN; ICAO: RKSI; WMO: 47113

Summary
- Airport type: Public
- Owner: Ministry of Land, Infrastructure and Transport
- Operator: Incheon International Airport Corporation
- Serves: Seoul metropolitan area
- Location: Yeongjong-gu, Incheon, South Korea
- Opened: 29 March 2001; 25 years ago
- Hub for: Air Premia; AirZeta; Asiana Airlines; FedEx Express; Korean Air; Polar Air Cargo
- Operating base for: Air Seoul; Jeju Air; Jin Air; Trinity Airways
- Elevation AMSL: 7 m (23 ft)
- Coordinates: 37°27′48″N 126°26′24″E
- Website: www.airport.kr

Maps
- Location of airport in South Korea
- Interactive map of Incheon International Airport

Runways
Direction	Length		Surface
Direction	m	ft	Surface
15R/33L	3,750	12,303	Asphalt
15L/33R	3,750	12,303	Asphalt
16L/34R	4,000	13,123	Asphalt
16R/34L	3,750	12,303	Asphalt

Helipads
Number	Length		Surface
Number	m	ft	Surface
H1	19	63	Concrete

Statistics (2024)
- Total passengers: ▲71,156,947
- Aircraft movements: ▲413,200
- Tonnes of cargo: ▼2,946,902
- Statistics from KAC

- Incheon International Airport
- Hangul: 인천국제공항
- Hanja: 仁川國際空港
- RR: Incheon gukjegonghang
- MR: Inch'ŏn kukchegonghang

Incheon International Airport (Korean: 인천국제공항, romanized: Incheon gukjegonghang; IATA: ICN, ICAO: RKSI) is the main international airport serving Seoul, the capital of South Korea. It is one of the largest and busiest airports in the world.

This airport opened for business on 29 March 2001, to replace the older Gimpo International Airport, which now serves mostly domestic destinations and shuttle flights to several East Asian metropolitan areas, particularly Shanghai–Hongqiao, Taipei–Songshan and Tokyo–Haneda.

Incheon International Airport is located west of Incheon's city center, on an artificially created piece of land between Yeongjong and Yongyu Islands. A shallow sea originally separated the two islands. That area between the two islands was reclaimed for the construction project, effectively connecting the once-separate Yeongjong and Yongyu islands. The reclaimed area and the two islands are all part of Yeongjong-gu, an administrative district of Incheon. The airport has 111 boarding gates altogether, with 44 in Terminal 1, 30 in Concourse A (connected to Terminal 1), and 37 in Terminal 2.

This airport was constructed to share the demand for air transport in the 21st century and to serve as a hub airport in Northeast Asia.

== History ==
Location of Incheon International Airport on reclaimed land joining Yeongjong and Yongyu Islands

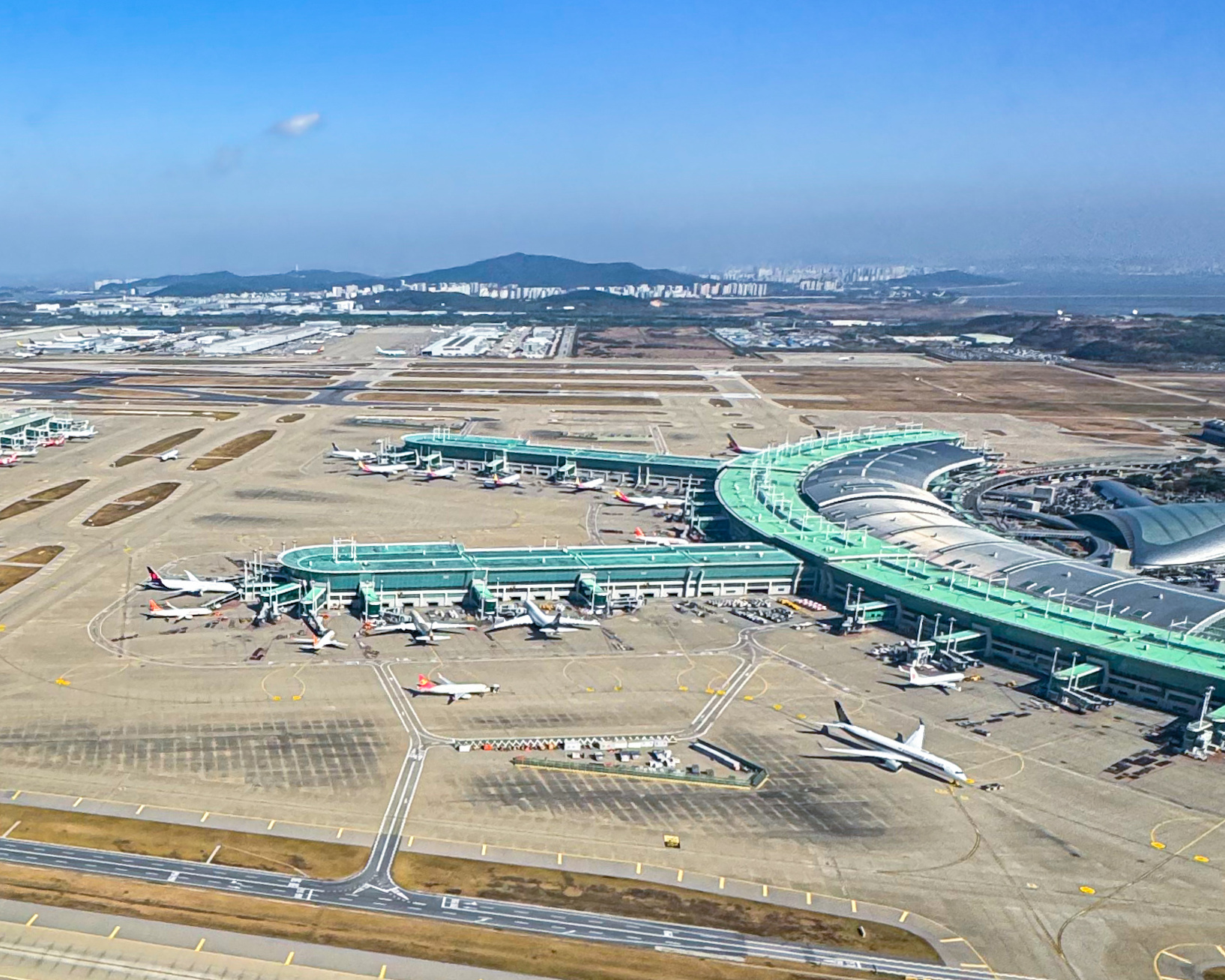
Aerial view of ICN T1 in 2023

International air traffic to South Korea increased after the 1988 Summer Olympics. In the 1990s, it became apparent that Gimpo International Airport could not cope with the increased air traffic. The government decided to build a new international airport to reduce the load on Gimpo International Airport.

Incheon International Airport Corporation was established in 1991 to operate Incheon International Airport. Park Nam-choon (President and CEO)

In November 1992, the construction of the Incheon airport began on reclaimed land between Yeongjong Island and Youngyu Island. It took eight years to finish, with an additional six months for testing. Completion was initially scheduled for 1997 but delayed due to the Asian economic crisis. The airport was officially opened on 21 March 2001. On 15 November 2006, an Airbus A380 landed at the airport as part of the first leg of its certification trip. Tests on the runways, taxiways, and ramps showed that the airport is fully capable of handling the A380.

To further upgrade service, Incheon and a major Korean logistics firm Hanjin Group (parent company of Korean Air) agreed on 10 January 2008, to build Yeongjong Medical Centre, which was completed in 2012. This hospital serves nearby residents and some 30,000 medical tourists who come to Korea annually.

== Operations ==
The airport opened for business in early 2001 to replace the older Gimpo International Airport, which now serves mostly domestic destinations plus shuttle flights to Beijing–Capital, Kaohsiung, Nagoya–Centrair, Osaka–Kansai, Shanghai–Hongqiao, Taipei–Songshan and Tokyo–Haneda although flights to Beijing, Kaohsiung, Nagoya and Osaka also operate from Incheon Airport.

Located 48 km (30 mi) west of Seoul, the capital and the largest city of South Korea, Incheon International Airport is the main hub for Korean Air, Asiana Airlines, Jeju Air, and Polar Air Cargo. The airport is a hub for international civilian air transportation and cargo traffic in East Asia. In 2024, the Incheon International Airport was the sixth-busiest airport in the world and third in Asia by cargo traffic, and 13th in the world and seventh in Asia by passenger traffic.

== Construction phases ==
Airport layout

The airport was originally planned to be built in three phases, incrementally increasing airport capacity as the demand grew. This was changed, however, to four phases after the airport was opened.

=== Phase 1 ===
In Phase 1, the airport had a capacity of 30 million passengers annually, and a cargo capacity of 2,700,000 tonnes annually. In this phase, a passenger terminal with a floor space of 496,000 square metres (5,338,900 sq ft), two parallel runways, a control tower, an administrative building, a transportation centre (the Integrated Transportation Centre, designed by Terry Farrell and Partners and Samoo Architects & Engineers), an integrated operations centre, three cargo terminals, international business centre, and a government office building were constructed.

=== Phase 2 ===
Phase 2 construction began in 2002 and was originally expected to be completed in December 2008. However, in an attempt to have the airport ready for the 2008 Beijing Olympics, which took place in August 2008, the schedule was modified, and Phase 2 construction was completed on 20 June 2008. During this construction phase, a third parallel 4,000-metre-long (13,123 ft 4 in) runway and a 13-hectare (32.1-acre) cargo terminal area was added. A 16.5-hectare (40.8-acre) concourse connected to the main passenger building via two parallel 870-metre-long (2,854 ft 4 in) underground passageways were added, with a Mitsubishi Crystal Mover shuttle train APM shuttling passengers between the concourse and the main terminal.

=== Phase 3 ===
The South Korean government invested ₩4 trillion until 2017 to expand Incheon International Airport. The second passenger terminal was constructed in the northern field of the airport, and its existing cargo terminal and other infrastructure were expanded. The terminals are connected by the underground "Starline" train. Also, a Landside Connecting system (Bus shuttle) is used for airport employees and departing passengers who don't come to the right terminal. After completion, Incheon International Airport can handle 62 million passengers and 5,800,000 tonnes (5,708,398 long tons; 6,393,406 short tons) of cargo a year, up from the previous capacity of 44 million passengers and 4,500,000 tonnes (4,428,929 long tons; 4,960,401 short tons). Construction began in 2011 and was completed in 2017. The terminal opened on 18 January 2018. Incheon's expansion also includes adding more aprons to park planes and extending a railway line to the city center of Seoul, about 70 kilometres (43 mi) away from the airport. The airport also signed an agreement to build a resort called "Inspire" which includes 6-star hotels, theme parks, and a casino.

=== Phase 4 ===
Between 2017 and 2024, a fourth construction phase at the airport was taking place. There was an expansion of Terminal 2, the building of a fourth runway, and additional apron and car parking facilities. Following completion of the works, it is expected that the hourly flight capacity of the airport will increase from 90 to 107. The 4th runway opened first on 17 June 2017, and phase 4 construction was fully completed later on 3 December 2024.

There are long-term plans for a fifth runway and a third terminal to handle low-cost carriers.

== Terminals ==
=== Terminal 1 ===
Terminal 1 (measuring 496,000 square metres (5,338,900 sq ft)) is the largest airport terminal by area in South Korea. Terminal 1 was designed by Curtis W. Fentress, FAIA, RIBA of Fentress Architects. It is 1,060 metres (3,480 ft) long, 149 metres (489 ft) wide, and 33 metres (108 ft) high. Its construction cost was 5.632 trillion South Korean Won. The terminal has 47 boarding ports (all of which can accommodate the Airbus A380), 50 customs inspection ports, 2 biological quarantine counters, 6 stationary and 14 portable passenger quarantine counters, 120 arrival passport inspection counters, 8 arrival security ports, 28 departure security ports, 252 check-in counters, and 120 departure passport inspection counters. In 2015, an automatic check-in counter lane was introduced, which people travelling via Korean Air, Asiana Airlines and China Southern Airlines can use. Instead of having airport staff at the counter, there is a machine where travellers input their flight information, scan their passports, receive their flight tickets, and lastly, load the luggage onto the conveyor. This system was planned to be introduced in Terminal 2, but in May 2015, Incheon Airport used one of the counter islands for the unmanned luggage handling system.

In December 2023, a Oneworld-branded and operated lounge opened in Incheon Airport Terminal 1 to serve passengers flying on seven of the alliance's 16 member carriers who serve the airport: Alaska Airlines, American Airlines, Cathay Pacific, Finnair, Malaysia Airlines, Qatar Airways, and SriLankan Airlines. It is the first in a series of planned lounges under development by the alliance.

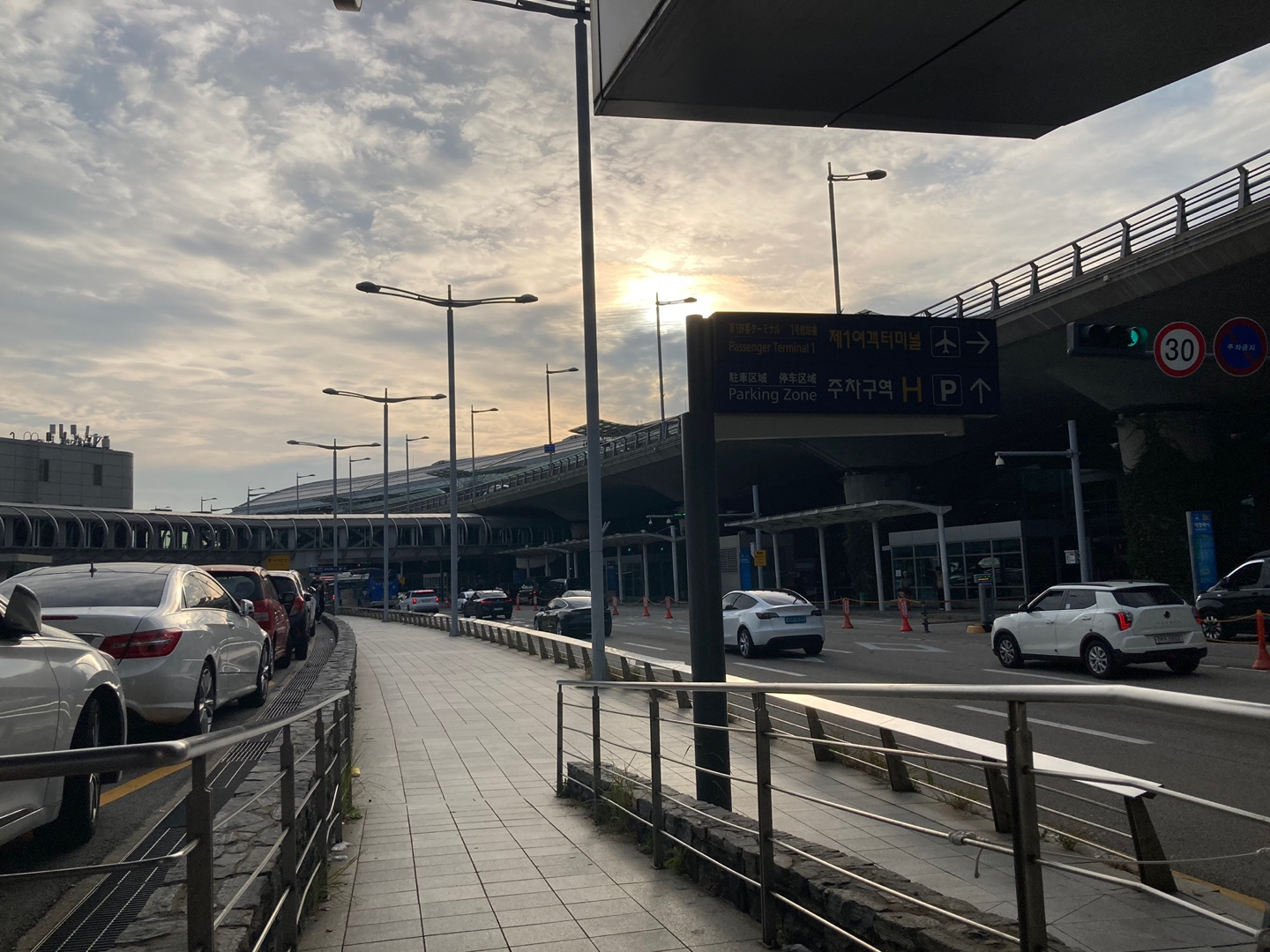
Exterior view at Terminal 1

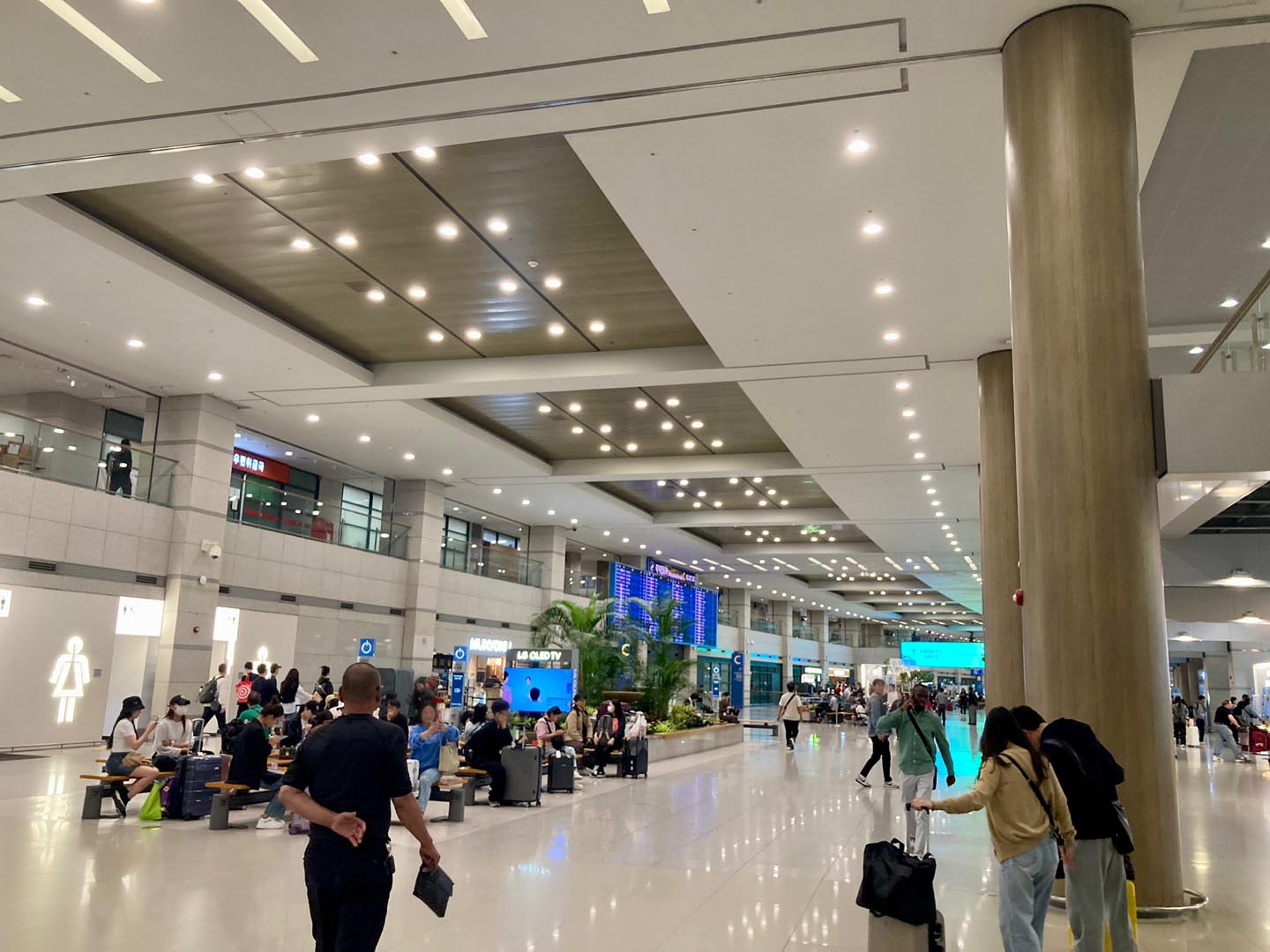
Interior view at Terminal 1

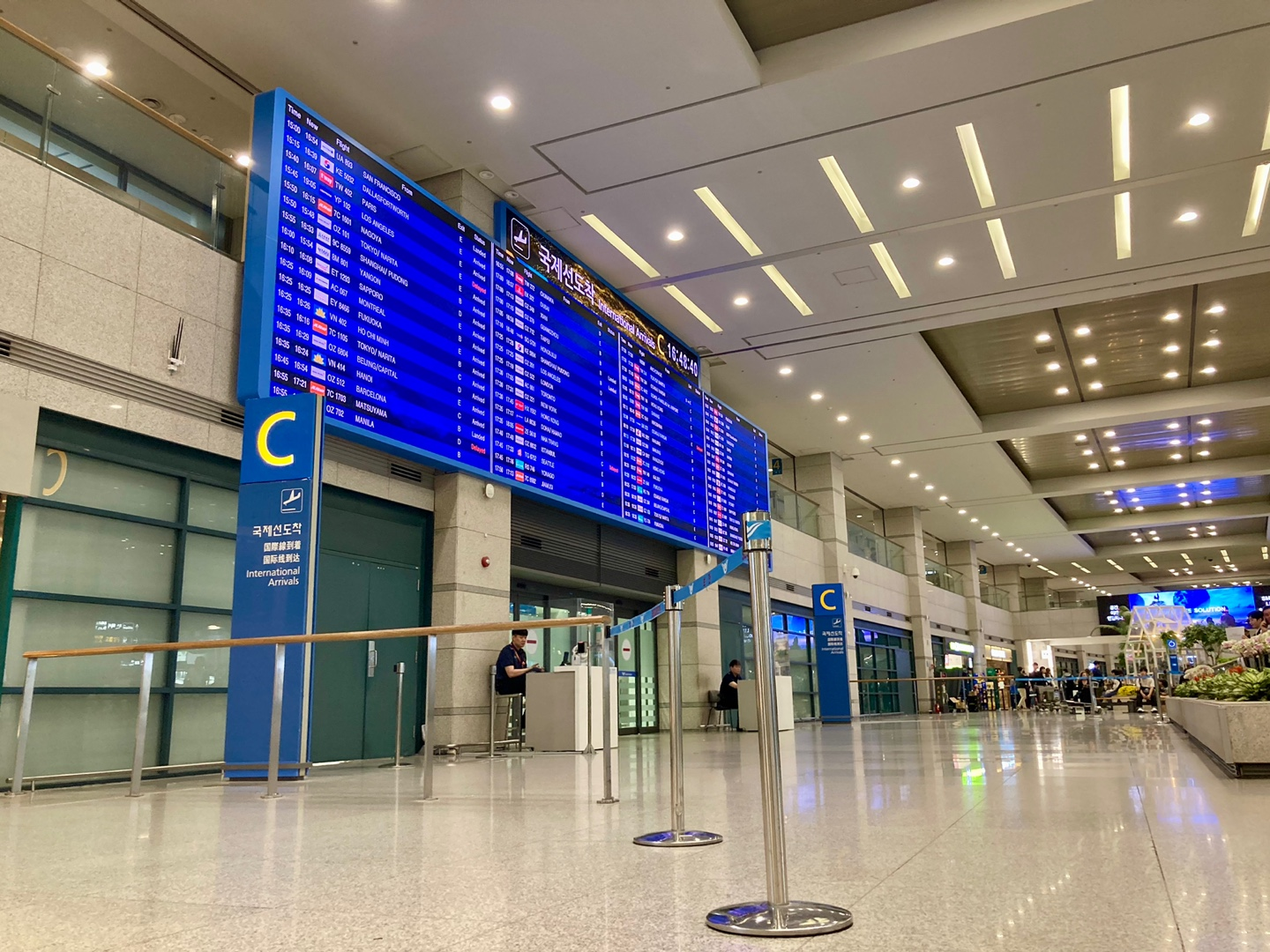
Arrivals

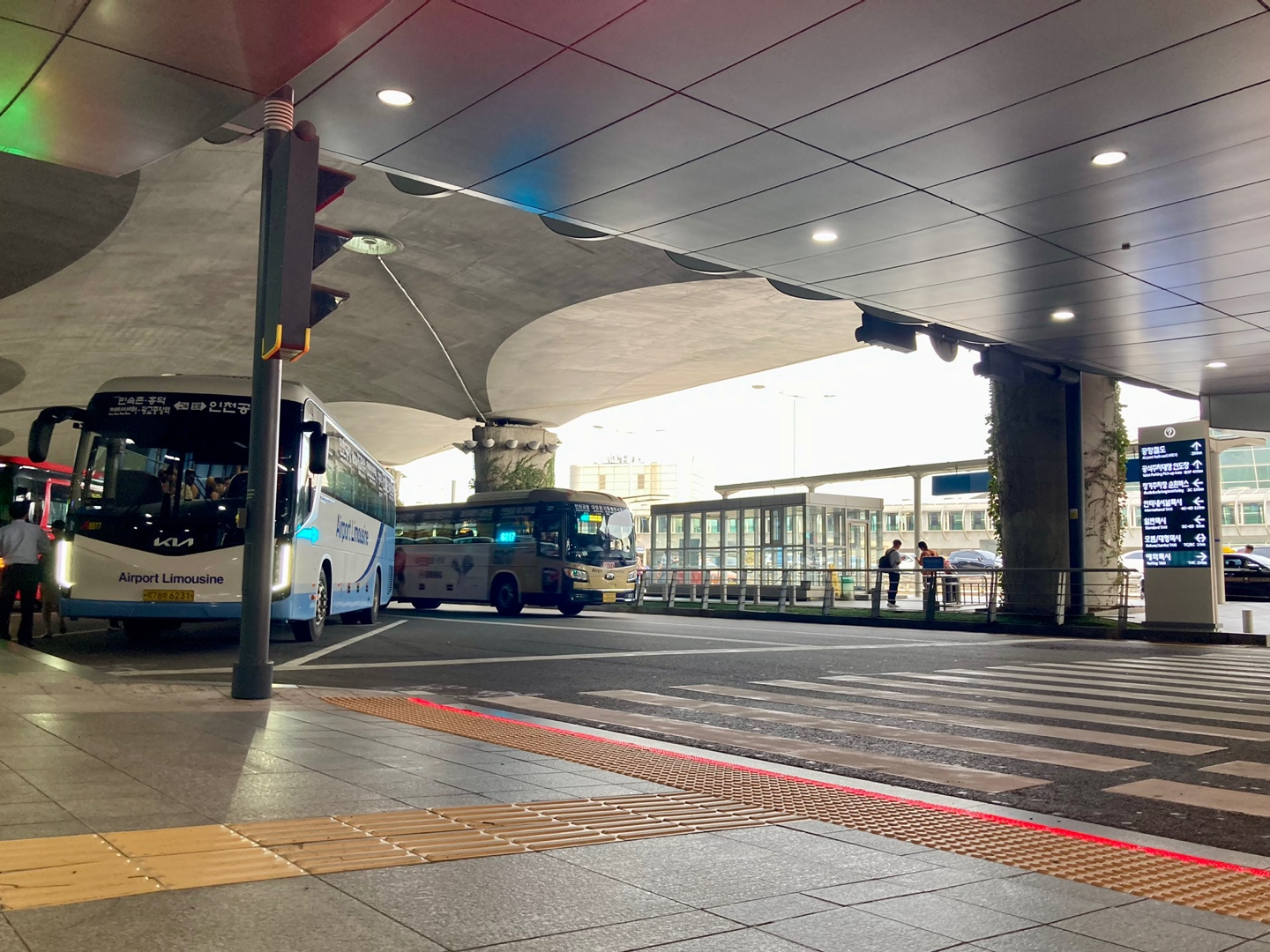
Bus stops

=== Midfield Concourse ===
The passenger concourse was completed at the end of May 2008. It is connected to Terminal 1 by two parallel 870-metre-long (2,850 ft) underground passageways equipped with IATs (Intra Airport Transit). It has 32 gates and six lounges.

=== Terminal 2 ===
A new passenger terminal, designed by Gensler, opened on 18 January 2018, and Korean Air, Air France, Delta Air Lines, and KLM flights were relocated from Terminal 1 to Terminal 2. Other SkyTeam members such as Aeroflot, Aeroméxico, China Airlines, Garuda Indonesia, and XiamenAir started serving Terminal 2 on 28 October 2018. From 1 July 2023, Jin Air, the low-cost subsidiary of Korean Air, started operating at Terminal 2. And the rest of the SkyTeam members, such as China Eastern Airlines, Shanghai Airlines, and Vietnam Airlines will be relocated to Terminal 2 later in the future. From 29 July 2025, Air Busan started operations at Terminal 2, followed by Air Seoul (from 9 September 2025) and Asiana Airlines (from 14 January 2026) relocated to Terminal 2 as well due to the merger with Korean Air. From 13 September 2025, Scandinavian Airlines started an inaugural flight to Incheon, using Terminal 2. From March 2026, Virgin Atlantic started flying into Incheon using Terminal 2 as well.

The airport area also has a golf course, spa, private sleeping rooms, an ice skating rink, a casino, indoor gardens, a video game center and the Museum of Korean Culture.

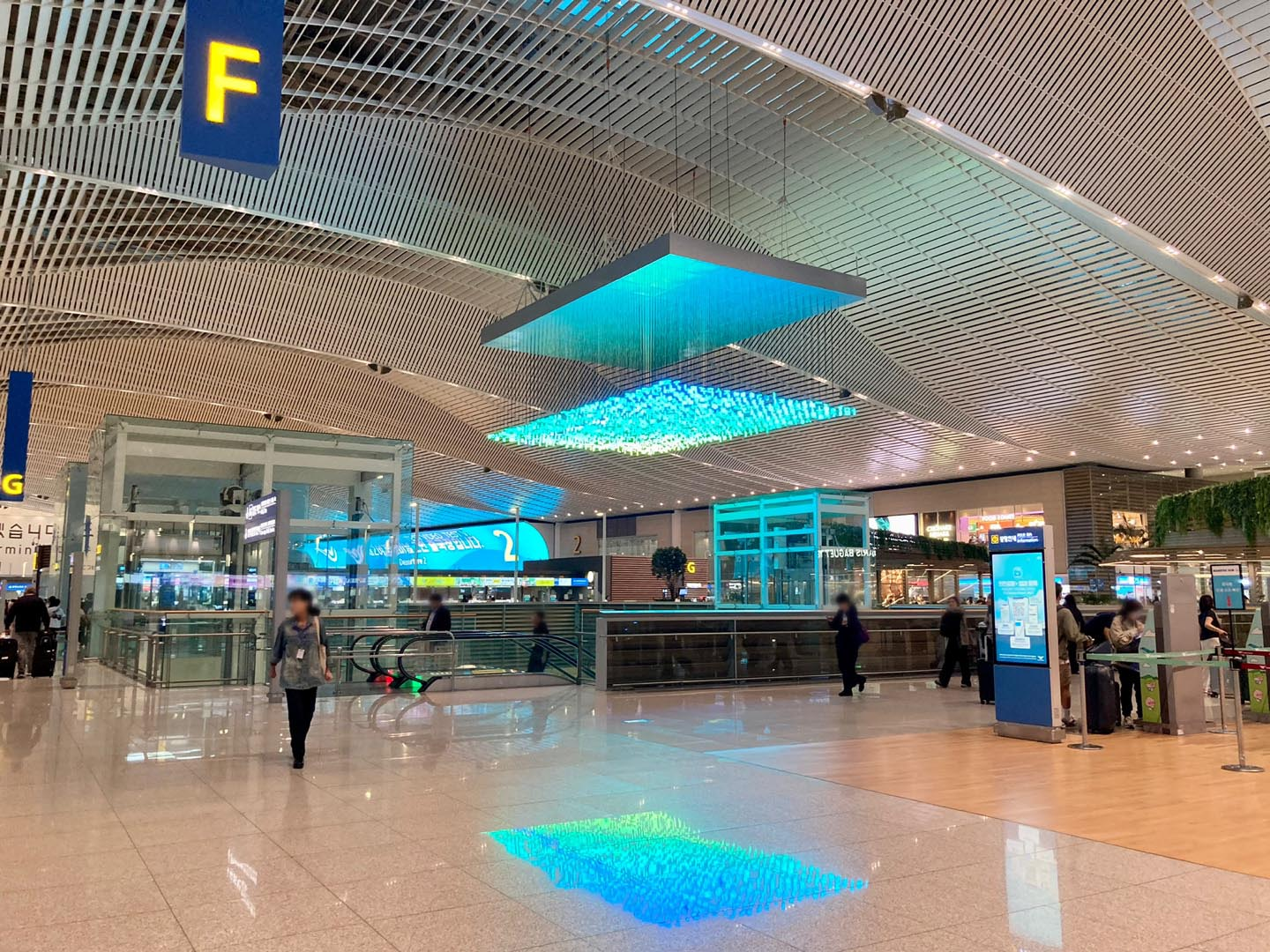
F ticket check-in

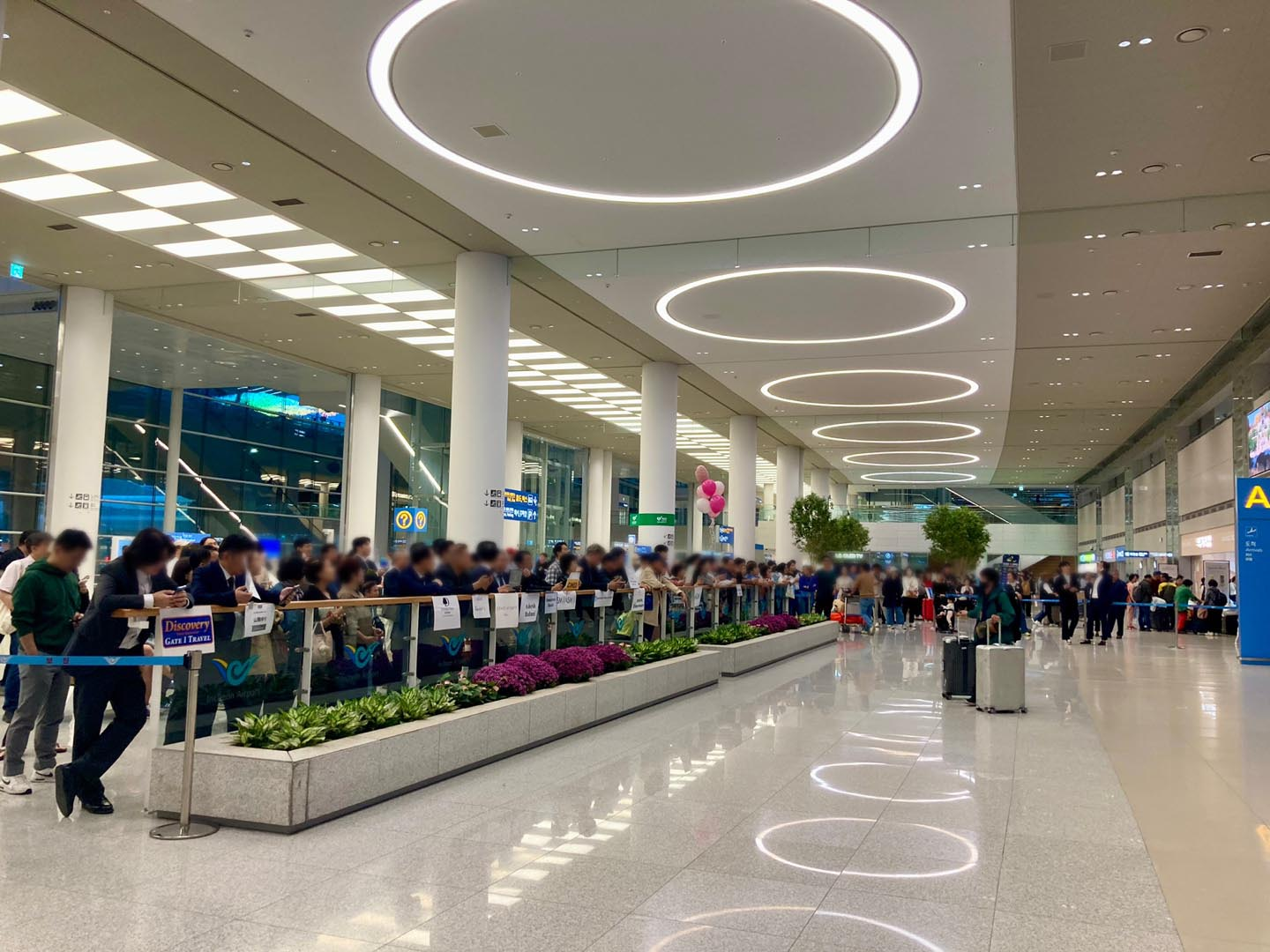
Waiting / arrivals

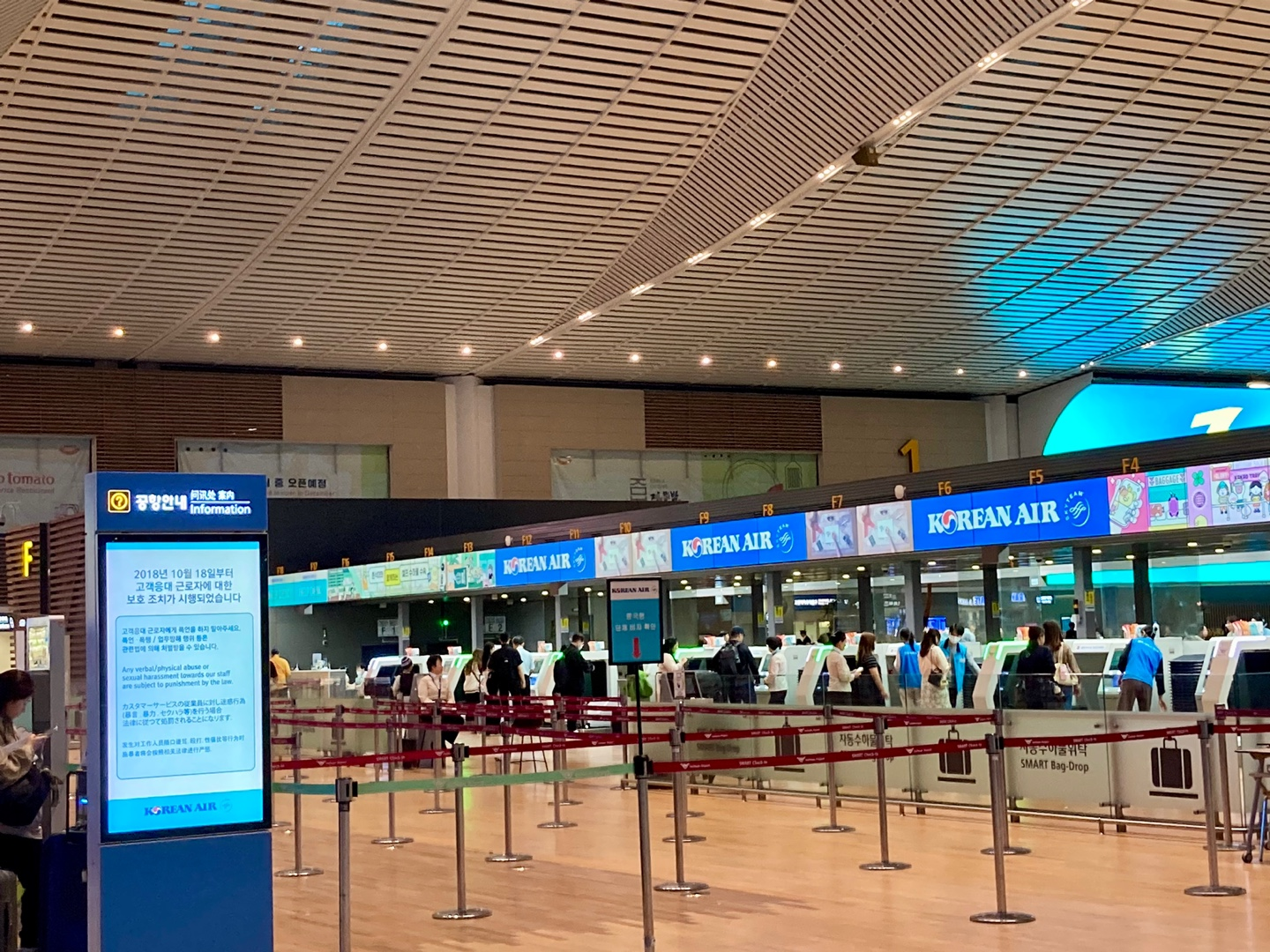
Departure & ticketing

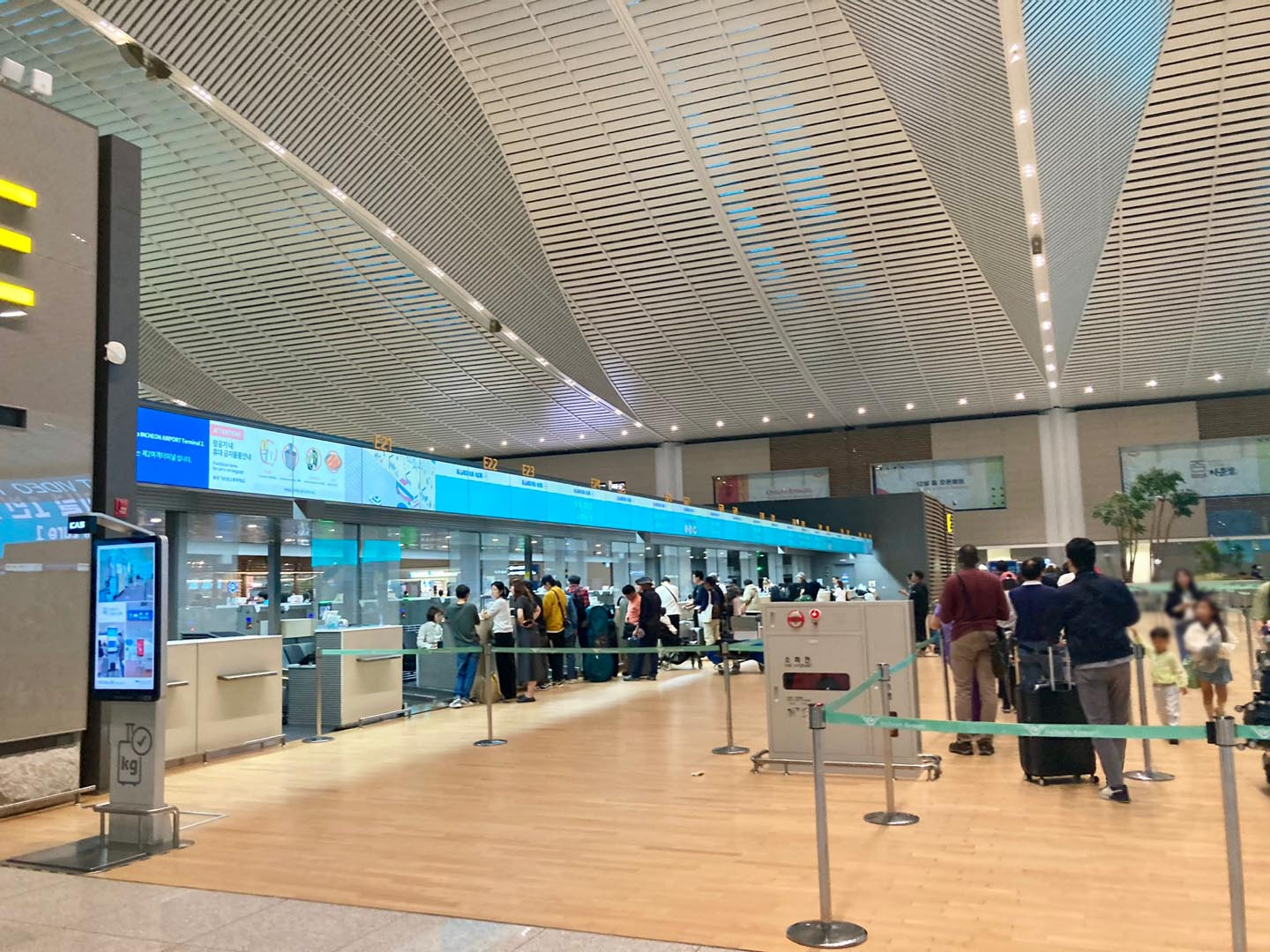
Departure & ticketing

Terminal 2 check-in area

Transit lobby of Terminal 2

Boarding gates

== Airlines and destinations ==
=== Passenger ===
Airlines	Destinations
9 Air	Guiyang
Aero K	Osaka–Kansai
Aero Mongolia	Ulaanbaatar
Aeroméxico	Mexico City–Benito Juárez
Air Astana	Almaty, Astana
Air Busan	Fukuoka, Nha Trang, Osaka–Kansai, Tokyo–Narita; Seasonal: Chiang Mai, Hong Kong
Air Canada	Toronto–Pearson, Vancouver; Seasonal: Montréal–Trudeau
Air China	Beijing–Capital, Beijing–Daxing, Chengdu–Tianfu, Chongqing, Hangzhou, Tianjin, Wenzhou
Air France	Paris–Charles de Gaulle
Air India	Delhi–Indira Gandhi
Air Macau	Macau
Air Premia	Bangkok–Suvarnabhumi, Da Nang, Ho Chi Minh City (resumes 3 December 2026), Hong Kong, Honolulu, Los Angeles, Newark, San Francisco, Sapporo–Chitose (begins 2 December 2026), Tokyo–Narita, Washington–Dulles; Charter: Barcelona, Dhaka, Oslo
Air Seoul	Fukuoka, Guam, Osaka–Kansai, Takamatsu, Tokyo–Narita, Yonago, Zhangjiajie
AirAsia	Kota Kinabalu, Kuala Lumpur–International
Alaska Airlines	Seattle/Tacoma
American Airlines	Dallas/Fort Worth
Asiana Airlines	Almaty, Bangkok–Suvarnabhumi, Barcelona, Beijing–Capital, Budapest, Changchun, Changsha, Chengdu–Tianfu, Chongqing, Clark, Da Nang, Dalian, Frankfurt, Fukuoka, Guangzhou, Hangzhou, Hanoi, Harbin, Ho Chi Minh City, Hong Kong, Istanbul, Jakarta–Soekarno-Hatta, Kobe, London–Heathrow, Los Angeles, Manila, Milan–Malpensa, Miyazaki, Nagoya–Centrair, Naha, Nanjing, New York–JFK, Osaka–Kansai, Paris–Charles de Gaulle, Phnom Penh, Phuket, Prague, Rome–Fiumicino, San Francisco, Sapporo–Chitose, Sendai, Shanghai–Pudong, Shenzhen, Singapore, Sydney–Kingsford Smith, Taipei–Taoyuan, Tashkent, Tianjin, Tokyo–Haneda, Tokyo–Narita, Ulaanbaatar, Xi'an, Yancheng, Yanji (all end 17 December 2026)
Batik Air Malaysia	Kuala Lumpur–International
Cathay Pacific	Hong Kong
Cebu Pacific	Cebu, Manila
Centrum Air	Tashkent
China Airlines	Kaohsiung, Taipei–Taoyuan
China Eastern Airlines	Beijing–Daxing, Hangzhou, Kunming, Nanjing, Qingdao, Shanghai–Pudong, Weihai, Wuxi, Xi'an, Yanji, Yantai
China Southern Airlines	Beijing–Daxing, Changchun, Changsha, Dalian, Guangzhou, Harbin, Shanghai–Pudong, Shenyang, Shenzhen, Ürümqi, Wuhan, Yantai, Zhengzhou
China United Airlines	Ordos
Colorful Guizhou Airlines	Guiyang
Delta Air Lines	Atlanta, Detroit, Minneapolis/Saint Paul, Salt Lake City, Seattle/Tacoma
Eastar Jet	Almaty, Bangkok–Suvarnabhumi, Chiang Mai, Da Nang, Fukuoka, Hohhot, Hong Kong, Kagoshima, Manado, Naha, Nha Trang, Osaka–Kansai, Phu Quoc, Sapporo–Chitose, Shanghai–Pudong, Taipei–Taoyuan, Tokushima, Tokyo–Narita, Xiamen, Yantai, Zhengzhou
El Al	Tel Aviv (resumes 28 March 2027)
Emirates	Dubai–International
Ethiopian Airlines	Addis Ababa, Tokyo–Narita
Etihad Airways	Abu Dhabi
EVA Air	Kaohsiung, Taipei–Taoyuan
Finnair	Helsinki
Garuda Indonesia	Jakarta–Soekarno-Hatta
Hainan Airlines	Haikou
HK Express	Hong Kong
Hong Kong Airlines	Hong Kong
Jeju Air	Bangkok–Suvarnabhumi, Batam (resumes 23 December 2026), Cebu, Clark, Da Nang, Denpasar, Fukuoka, Hakodate, Hanoi, Harbin, Hiroshima, Hong Kong, Jeju, Jiamusi, Kobe, Kota Kinabalu, Macau, Matsuyama, Nagoya–Centrair, Naha, Ōita, Osaka–Kansai, Phu Quoc, Qingdao, Saipan, Sapporo–Chitose, Sendai (begins 8 January 2027), Shijiazhuang, Shizuoka, Singapore, Tagbilaran, Taipei–Taoyuan, Tokyo–Narita, Ulaanbaatar, Vientiane, Weihai; Seasonal: Guilin
Jetstar	Brisbane, Sydney–Kingsford Smith
Jin Air	Bangkok–Suvarnabhumi, Cebu, Chiang Mai, Clark, Da Nang, Fukuoka, Guam, Guilin, Ho Chi Minh City (begins 24 December 2026), Ishigaki, Kitakyushu, Kobe, Kota Kinabalu, Nagoya–Centrair, Naha, Nha Trang, Osaka–Kansai, Phu Quoc, Qingdao, Sapporo–Chitose, Shimojishima, Tagbilaran (resumes 1 January 2027), Taichung, Taipei–Taoyuan, Takamatsu, Tokyo–Narita, Yantai, Yichang; Seasonal: Phuket, Vientiane
KLM	Amsterdam
Korean Air	Amsterdam, Aomori, Atlanta, Auckland, Bangkok–Suvarnabhumi, Beijing–Capital, Boston, Brisbane, Budapest, Busan, (Note: Korean Air's service between Incheon and Busan is available only to passengers flying internationally to/from South Korea with Korean Air.) Cebu, Changsha, Chiang Mai, Chicago–O'Hare, Da Nang, Daegu, (Note: Korean Air's service between Incheon and Daegu is available only to passengers flying internationally to/from South Korea with Korean Air.) Dalian, Dallas/Fort Worth, Delhi–Indira Gandhi, Denpasar, Frankfurt, Fukuoka, Fuzhou, Guam, Guangzhou, Hangzhou, Hanoi, Hefei, Hiroshima (begins 23 December 2026), Ho Chi Minh City, Hong Kong, Honolulu, Istanbul, Jakarta–Soekarno-Hatta, Kagoshima, Kathmandu, Kobe, Komatsu, Kuala Lumpur–International, Kumamoto, Kunming, Las Vegas, Lisbon, London–Heathrow, Los Angeles, Macau, Madrid, Manila, Milan–Malpensa, Nagasaki, Nagoya–Centrair, Naha, Nanjing, New York–JFK, Newark (resumes 22 May 2027), Nha Trang, Niigata, Okayama, Osaka–Kansai, Paris–Charles de Gaulle, Phnom Penh, Phu Quoc, Phuket, Prague, Qingdao, Rome–Fiumicino, San Francisco, Sapporo–Chitose, Seattle/Tacoma, Shanghai–Pudong, Shenyang, Shenzhen, Singapore, Sydney–Kingsford Smith, Taichung, Taipei–Taoyuan, Tianjin, Tokyo–Haneda, Tokyo–Narita, Toronto–Pearson, Ulaanbaatar, Vancouver, Vienna, Washington–Dulles, Wuhan, Xi'an, Xiamen, Yangon, Yanji, Zhangjiajie, Zhengzhou; Seasonal: Melbourne (resumes 18 December 2026), Zurich; Seasonal charter: Athens
Lao Airlines	Vientiane
LOT Polish Airlines	Warsaw–Chopin, Wrocław
Lufthansa	Frankfurt, Munich
Malaysia Airlines	Kuala Lumpur–International
MIAT Mongolian Airlines	Ulaanbaatar
Myanmar Airways International	Yangon
Parata Air	Da Nang, Hanoi, Los Angeles (begins 1 May 2027), Nha Trang, Osaka–Kansai, Sapporo–Chitose, Shenzhen, Tokyo–Narita
Peach	Osaka–Kansai, Tokyo–Haneda, Tokyo–Narita
Philippine Airlines	Manila; Seasonal: Kalibo
Qanot Sharq	Tashkent
Qatar Airways	Doha
Qingdao Airlines	Qingdao
Royal Brunei Airlines	Bandar Seri Begawan
Scandinavian Airlines	Copenhagen
SCAT Airlines	Şymkent
Scoot	Singapore, Taipei–Taoyuan
Shandong Airlines	Jinan, Qingdao, Sanya, Wuyishan
Shanghai Airlines	Shanghai–Pudong
Shenzhen Airlines	Shenzhen, Wuxi
Sichuan Airlines	Chengdu–Tianfu, Zhangjiajie
Singapore Airlines	Singapore
Sky Angkor Airlines	Phnom Penh
Spring Airlines	Shanghai–Pudong, Shijiazhuang
SriLankan Airlines	Colombo–Bandaranaike
Sun PhuQuoc Airways	Hanoi, Ho Chi Minh City, Phu Quoc
Swiss International Air Lines	Seasonal: Zurich
Thai Airways International	Bangkok–Suvarnabhumi
Thai VietJet Air	Bangkok–Suvarnabhumi
Tianjin Airlines	Tianjin
Tigerair Taiwan	Taipei–Taoyuan
Trinity Airways	Bangkok–Suvarnabhumi, Barcelona, Bishkek, Chiang Mai (resumes 7 January 2027), Da Nang, Fukuoka, Hong Kong, Jakarta–Soekarno-Hatta, Jinan, Kalibo, Kaohsiung, Kobe (begins 18 December 2026), Kumamoto, Naha, Nha Trang, Osaka–Kansai, Paris–Charles de Gaulle, Phu Quoc, Qingdao, Rome–Fiumicino, Saga, Sapporo–Chitose, Shenyang, Singapore, Sydney–Kingsford Smith, Taichung, Tokyo–Narita, Vancouver, Vientiane (resumes 7 January 2027), Wuhan; Seasonal: Ulaanbaatar, Zagreb
Turkish Airlines	Istanbul
Turkmenistan Airlines	Ashgabat
United Airlines	Newark, San Francisco
Uzbekistan Airways	Tashkent
VietJet Air	Da Nang, Hai Phong, Hanoi, Ho Chi Minh City, Nha Trang, Phu Quoc
Vietnam Airlines	Da Nang, Hanoi, Ho Chi Minh City, Nha Trang
Virgin Atlantic	London–Heathrow
WestJet	Seasonal: Calgary
XiamenAir	Fuzhou, Xiamen
Zipair Tokyo	Tokyo–Narita

=== Cargo ===
Airlines	Destinations
AeroLogic	Leipzig/Halle
Air Central	Guangzhou, Weihai, Zhengzhou
Air Hong Kong	Hong Kong
AirZeta	Atlanta, Brussels, Chengdu–Shuangliu, Frankfurt, Hanoi, Hong Kong, Los Angeles, Milan–Malpensa, New York–JFK, Osaka–Kansai, Qingdao, San Francisco, Seattle–Tacoma, Shanghai–Pudong, Singapore, Tianjin, Tokyo–Narita, Yantai
ANA Cargo	Tokyo–Narita
Atlas Air	Atlanta, Chicago–O'Hare, Chicago–Rockford, Cincinnati, Dallas/Fort Worth, Los Angeles, Miami, New York–JFK
Cargolux	Luxembourg
Cargolux Italia	Milan–Malpensa
Cathay Cargo	Hong Kong
Central Airlines	Shenzhen, Yantai
China Cargo Airlines	Shanghai–Pudong
China Postal Airlines	Xi'an, Zhengzhou
DHL Aviation	Cincinnati, Dalian, Guam, Hahn, Oslo, Qingdao, Shanghai–Pudong, Ulaanbaatar, Wuxi
Ethiopian Airlines Cargo	Addis Ababa
FedEx Express	Anchorage, Guangzhou, Indianapolis, Memphis, Oakland
JAL Cargo	Nagoya–Centrair, Tokyo–Narita
JDL Airlines	Nanjing, Wuxi
Kalitta Air	Anchorage, Chicago–O'Hare, Cincinnati, Los Angeles, New York–JFK, San Francisco
KLM Cargo; Operated by Martinair	Amsterdam
Korean Air Cargo	Amsterdam, Atlanta, Bangkok–Suvarnabhumi, Campinas, Chicago–O'Hare, Frankfurt, Guadalajara, Guangzhou, Hanoi, Ho Chi Minh City, Hong Kong, Jakarta–Soekarno-Hatta, Kitakyushu, Kuala Lumpur–International, London–Heathrow, Los Angeles, Madrid, Milan–Malpensa, New York–JFK, Osaka–Kansai, Oslo, Penang, Seattle–Tacoma, Shanghai–Pudong, Singapore, Tianjin, Tokyo–Narita, Toronto–Pearson, Zhengzhou, Zurich
Lufthansa Cargo	Frankfurt
Mas Air	Mexico City–Felipe Ángeles
National Airlines (N8)	Anchorage, Hong Kong
Polar Air Cargo	Cincinnati, Los Angeles
Qatar Airways Cargo	Doha
SF Airlines	Ezhou, Jinan, Yantai
Silk Way West Airlines	Baku
Singapore Airlines Cargo	Cincinnati, Singapore
Sky Lease Cargo	Chicago–O'Hare, Los Angeles
Turkish Cargo	Istanbul
Turkmenistan Airlines Cargo	Ashgabat
UPS Airlines	Anchorage, Louisville
Western Global Airlines	Anchorage, Chicago–O'Hare, Los Angeles
YTO Cargo Airlines	Wenzhou

== Ground transport ==
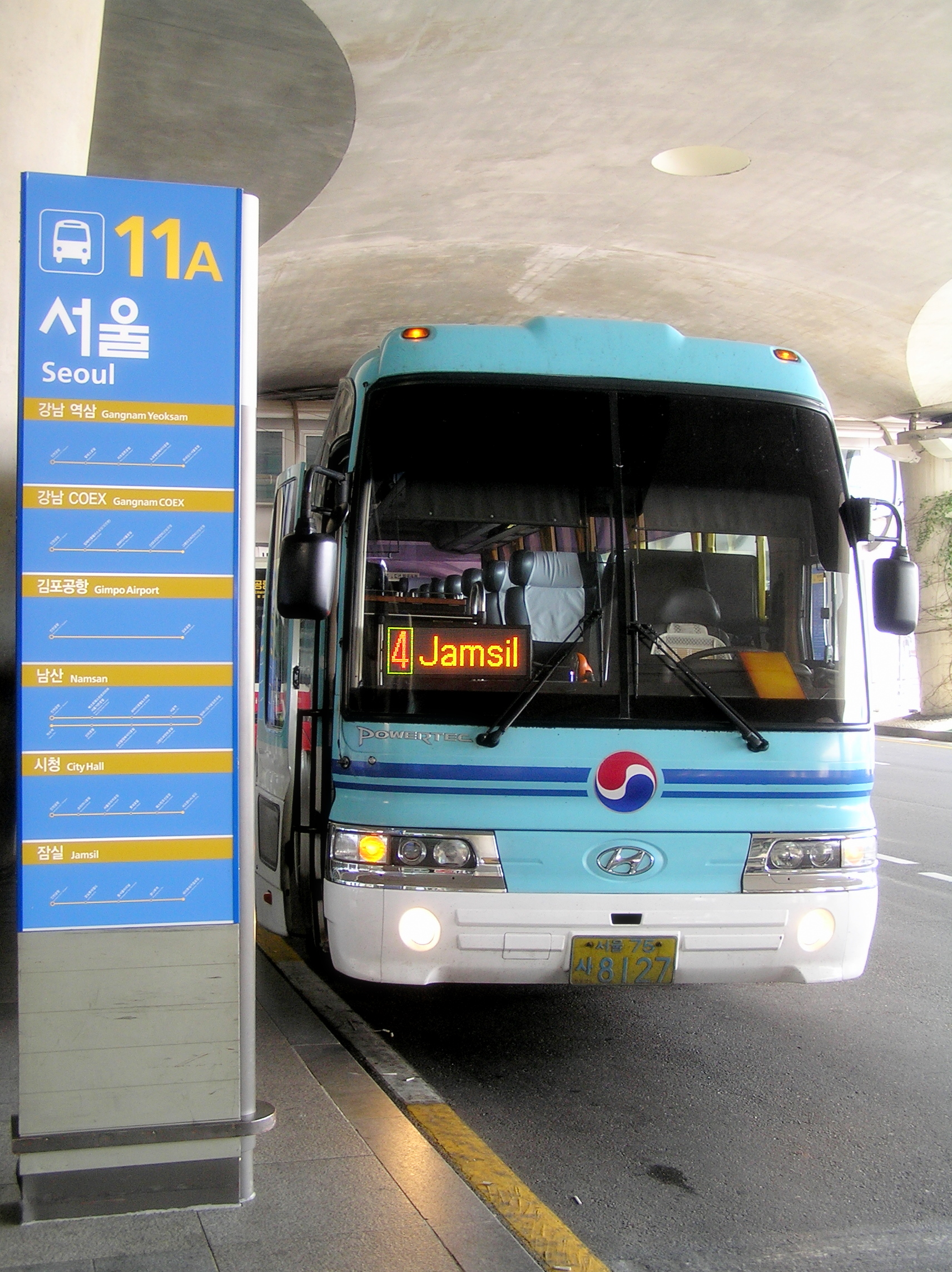
A limousine bus at Incheon Airport bound for Jamsil Subway Station in Seoul

=== Public transport ===
==== Rail ====
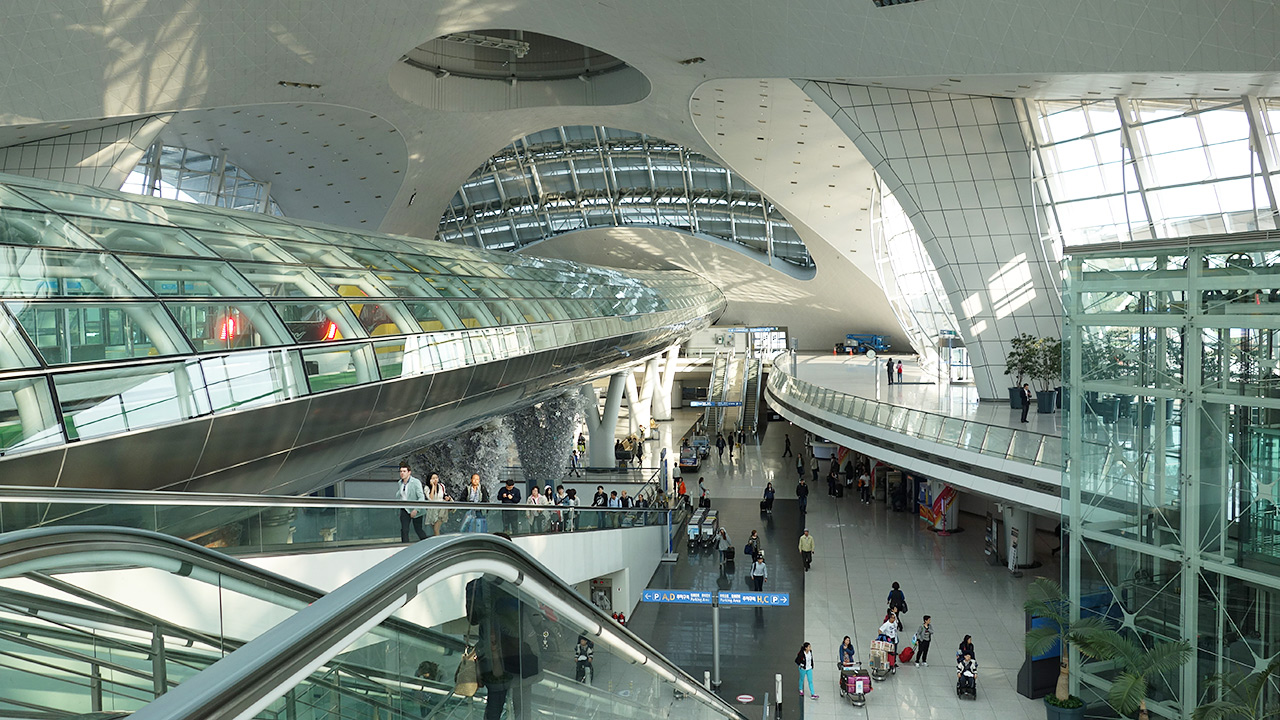
Incheon Airport rail terminal for AREX and formerly KTX

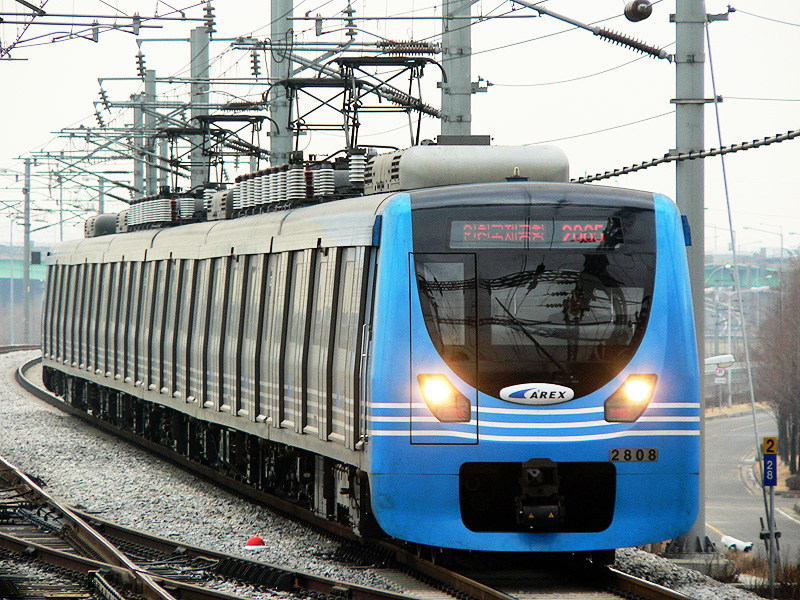
AREX 2000 series EMU with commuter train service

The Airport Railroad Express (AREX and styled as A'REX) has two stations located in both the Transport Centre adjacent to the Terminal 1 building (Incheon International Airport Terminal 1 station) and is in the basement of Terminal 2 (Incheon International Airport Terminal 2 station). It provides service to Gimpo International Airport and Seoul. Many of the stations along the line provide connections to Incheon Subway, Seoul Metropolitan Subway, and Incheon Airport Maglev.

For departing passengers, Seoul Station City Airport Terminal offers in-town early check-in service and has related immigration services before arriving at the airport. Seoul Station City Airport Terminal is the only available place in Seoul where in-town check-in service is provided. That is since CALT closed its in-town check-in operation at Gangnam in 2023.

The Korea Train eXpress (KTX) operated at the same station as AREX but used a different platform. It operated 20 times per day from the airport; twelve times on the Gyeongbu Line, twice on the Gyeonjeon Line, four times on the Honam Line, and twice on the Jeolla Line. The service started in 2014 but was suspended in March 2018 due to low ridership. The suspension became permanent in September 2018 as the line was officially closed.

The Incheon Airport Maglev opened on 3 February 2016 and closed on 1 September 2023. The first phase was to be 6.1 km long, spread over six stations (but eight stations were built, spanning more than 8 km), taking riders from the airport toward the southwest of the island where a water park is located. Phase 2 was to be 9.7 km long, extending the line to the northwest of the island. Phase 3 would have added 37.4 km, transforming the line into a circle. After converting the tracks from Maglev to orbital tram tracks, service is expected to resume from March 2024.

==== Bus ====
Airport shuttle buses transport passengers between Terminal 1 and Terminal 2. Buses are free, arrive every 5 to 8 minutes, take approximately 20 minutes of travel time, and stop at the Hyatt Hotel or airport fire station en route, depending on direction. Airport buses are called limousine buses. Standard limousine buses travel to Gimpo Airport & Songjeong station. Intercity buses connect with other towns and cities in Korea. The City Air Logistics & Transportation company runs an airport bus line directly connected to the bus station at COEX, Gangnam.

==== Ferry ====
A ferry service connects Yeongjong-do to the mainland. However, the dock is located a considerable distance from the airport. An alternative means of transport must be sought upon arriving at the island to be able to get to the airport.

=== Car ===
The airport provides a short-term parking lot for 4,000 cars and a long-term parking lot for 6,000 cars. Shuttle services connect the long-term parking lot to the passenger terminal and the cargo terminal. Car rental is located near the long-term parking lot. A link to the mainland is provided by the toll Yeongjong Bridge and an expressway. A second expressway on the Incheon Bridge also connects the island to central Incheon.

=== Roads ===
It is connected to the Incheon Bridge and the 2nd Gyeongin Expressway. Airport limousine buses, which have been operating since the day Incheon International Airport opened, and many visitors in private cars use this road. When the 3rd Yeonyukgyo Bridge opens in 2025, a general road connecting to the Gyeongin Expressway, Incheon Airport will be accessible by two-wheeled vehicles and on foot.

== Traffic and statistics ==
In 2017, the airport was the world's fourth busiest airport by cargo traffic and third in Asia, and the world's 19th busiest airport by passenger traffic and ninth in Asia. In 2019, the airport served a total of 70,857,908 passengers.

=== Top destinations ===
Busiest international routes (2024)
Rank	Airport	Passengers	Operating airlines
1	Tokyo–Narita	4,837,254	Aero K, Air Busan, Air Japan, Air Premia, Air Seoul, Asiana Airlines, Eastar Jet, Ethiopian Airlines, Jeju Air, Jin Air, Korean Air, T'way Air, Zipair Tokyo
1	Tokyo–Haneda	357,320	Asiana Airlines, Korean Air, Peach Aviation
2	Osaka–Kansai	4,464,760	Air Busan, Air Seoul, Asiana Airlines, Eastar Jet, Jeju Air, Jin Air, Korean Air, Peach Aviation, T'way Air
3	Fukuoka	3,376,186	Air Busan, Air Seoul, Asiana Airlines, Eastar Jet, Jeju Air, Jin Air, Korean Air, T'way Air
4	Bangkok–Suvarnabhumi	2,960,587	Air Busan, Air Premia, Asiana Airlines, Eastar Jet, Jeju Air, Jin Air, Korean Air, Thai International Airways, T'way Air
4	Bangkok–Don Mueang	93,020	Thai AirAsia X
5 (Note: As a general rule, Hong Kong is strictly separated from Macau because of historical reasons. However, the distance between the two cities is very short and also economical, cultural exchanges are so active. Thus, this table ties together for convenience.)	Hong Kong	2,680,682	Air Premia, Asiana Airlines, Cathay Pacific, Greater Bay Airlines, Hong Kong Airlines, HK Express, Jeju Air, Jin Air, Korean Air, T'way Air
5	Macau	433,779	Air Macau, Jeju Air, Jin Air, Korean Air
6	Taipei–Taoyuan	2,315,298	Asiana Airlines, China Airlines, Eastar Jet, EVA Air, Jeju Air, Jin Air, Korean Air, Scoot, Tigerair Taiwan
7	Da Nang	2,112,961	Air Premia, Air Seoul, Asiana Airlines, Eastar Jet, Jeju Air, Jin Air, Korean Air, T'way Air, Vietjet Air, Vietnam Airlines
8	Singapore	2,005,750	Asiana Airlines, Korean Air, Singapore Airlines, Scoot, T'way Air
9	Nha Trang	1,766,778	Aero K, Air Busan, Air Seoul, Eastar Jet, Jeju Air, Jin Air, Korean Air, T'way Air, Vietjet Air, Vietnam Airlines
10	Manila	1,753,038	Asiana Airlines, Cebu Pacific, Jeju Air, Korean Air, Philippines AirAsia, Philippine Airlines
^{Source: Korea Airportal}

=== Annual traffic ===
Years	Aircraft operations	Passengers	Cargo (tonnes)
2001	86,807	14,542,290	1,186,015
2002	126,094	20,924,171	1,705,928
2003	130,185	19,789,874	1,843,055
2004	149,776	24,084,072	2,133,444
2005	160,843	26,051,466	2,150,139
2006	182,007	28,191,116	2,336,571
2007	211,404	31,227,897	2,555,580
2008	211,102	29,973,522	2,423,717
2009	198,918	28,549,770	2,313,002
2010	214,835	33,478,925	2,684,499
2011	229,580	35,062,366	2,539,222
2012	254,037	38,970,864	2,456,724
2013	271,224	41,482,828	2,464,385
2014	290,043	45,512,099	2,557,681
2015	305,446	49,281,220	2,595,677
2016	339,673	57,765,397	2,714,341
2017	360,295	62,082,032	2,921,691
2018	387,497	68,259,763	2,952,123
2019	404,104	71,169,722	2,764,369
2020	149,982	12,094,851	2,822,370
2021	131,027	3,198,909	3,329,292
2022	171,253	17,869,759	2,945,855
2023	337,299	56,131,064	3,600,288
2024	413,200	71,156,947	2,946,902
2025	425,760	74,071,475	2,954,684
Source: IIAC Airport Statistics

== Marketing ==
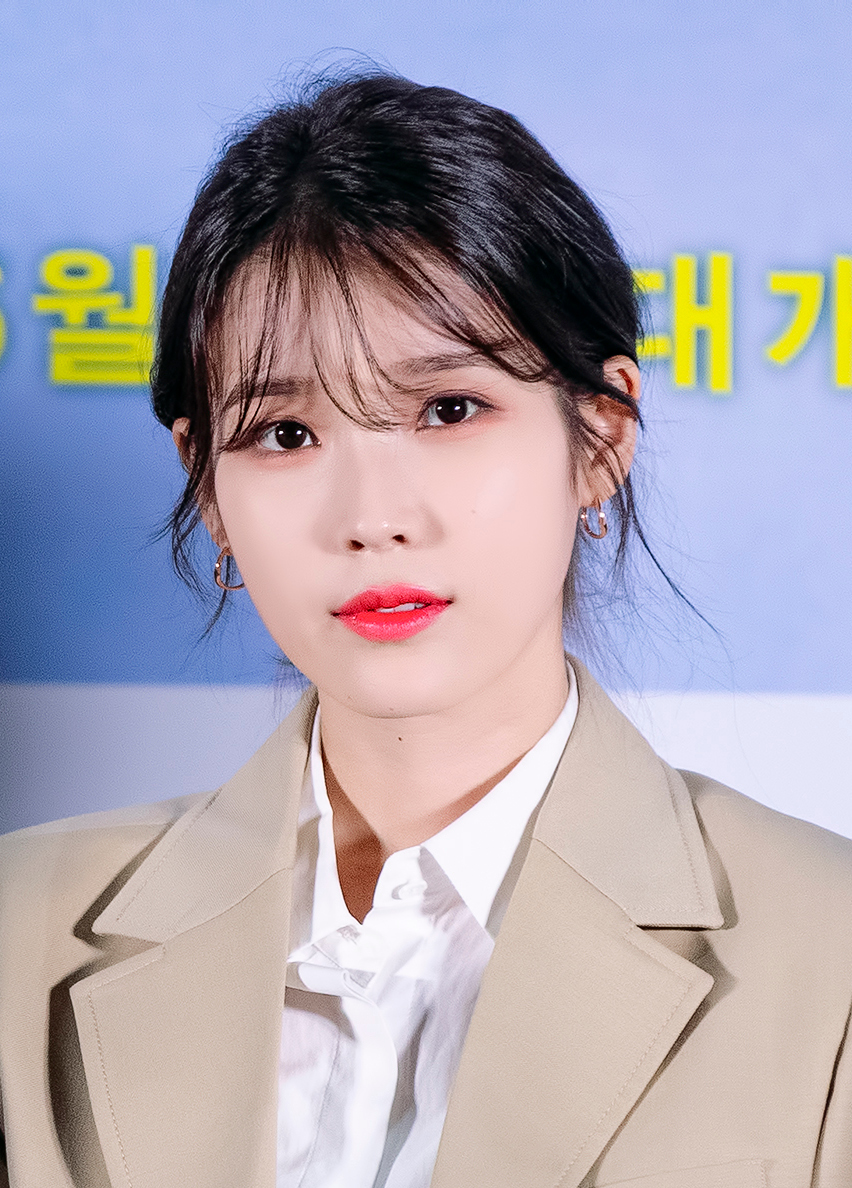
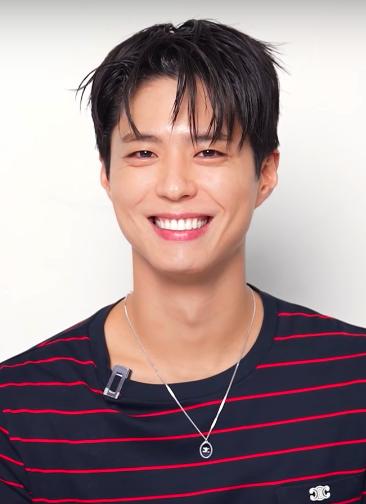
Singer IU (left) was appointed as promotional envoy of Incheon International Airport Customs for 2025, and actor Park Bo-gum (right) was appointed as honorary ambassador for the airport from 2025 to 2028.

In August 2025, singer-actress IU was named promotional envoy for Incheon Airport customs. In September 2025, the Incheon International Airport Corporation (IIAC) announced that they have appointed actor Park Bo-gum as honorary ambassador.

== In popular culture ==
The Sims 4 team released The Sims 4: Incheon Arrivals kit, inspired by the fashion at the Incheon airport.

Scenes in seasons 1 and 2 of Squid Game were filmed in Incheon International Airport. During the filming of the season 2 scenes, there was alleged mistreatment towards members of the public from the production staff, causing the production company to release an apology.

== Accolades ==
As of 2024, the airport has been rated by Skytrax as the third-best airport in the world. Skytrax has also rated the airport as the world's best international transit airport and one of the world's cleanest airports. The airport is one of Skytrax's 5-star airports, and was awarded for the best airport security in 2021.

During the entire run of the best airport worldwide ranking by Airports Council International (ACI) from 2005 to 2011, Incheon International Airport topped the ranking every year. ACI also rated the airport as the best airport in Asia-Pacific for 10 consecutive years from 2006 to 2016 until the ranking series ended in 2017.

== Accidents and incidents ==
- On 16 June 2011, an Airbus A321-200, operating as Asiana Airlines Flight 324 between Chengdu Shuangliu International Airport, China and Incheon International Airport, was fired upon by two soldiers of the Republic of Korea Marine Corps as it came in to land at Incheon. A total of 99 rounds were discharged at the aircraft, which was out of range and it made a safe landing without sustaining any damage. The soldiers had misidentified the aircraft as belonging to the North Korean military and were acting on orders that permitted them to engage without reference to senior officers, following the Bombardment of Yeonpyeong in November 2010.

== See also ==
- Transport in South Korea
- List of airports in South Korea
- Busiest airports in South Korea by passenger traffic
