= List of Airport Service Quality Award winners =

Seoul's Incheon International Airport has won "Best Airport Worldwide" on every occasion.

This list of Airport Service Quality Award winners is a representation of the world's airports, which have been recognised by the Airports Council International (ACI) to be leading in customer satisfaction and have thus received an Airport Service Quality Award (ASQ). The ACI gives out the ASQ, based on passenger satisfaction ratings in the ASQ Survey, which is a global survey based on interviews with passengers on the day of travel. Only airports which have participated in all four quarters of the year and followed the sampling methodology of the ACI are eligible for an Award. Along with the World Airport Awards by Skytrax, this award is considered one of the most prestigious accolades in the industry.

== Best Airports Worldwide ==
Year	1st	Country	2nd	Country	3rd	Country
2006	Incheon International Airport	South Korea	Hong Kong International Airport	Hong Kong	Kuala Lumpur International Airport	Malaysia
2007	Incheon International Airport	South Korea	Kuala Lumpur International Airport	Malaysia	Singapore Changi Airport	Singapore
2008	Incheon International Airport	South Korea	Singapore Changi Airport	Singapore	Hong Kong International Airport	Hong Kong
2009	Incheon International Airport	South Korea	Singapore Changi Airport	Singapore	Hong Kong International Airport	Hong Kong
2010	Incheon International Airport	South Korea	Singapore Changi Airport	Singapore	Hong Kong International Airport	Hong Kong
2011	Incheon International Airport	South Korea	Singapore Changi Airport	Singapore	Beijing International Airport	China

== Best Airport by Region ==
=== Africa ===
==== Over 20 million passengers ====
Year	1st	Country	2nd	Country	3rd	Country	4th	Country	5th	Country
2006^{a}	Abu Dhabi International Airport	United Arab Emirates	Cape Town International Airport	South Africa	Hamad International Airport	Qatar	—N/a		—N/a	
2007	O. R. Tambo International Airport	South Africa	Cape Town International Airport	South Africa	Durban International Airport	South Africa	—N/a		—N/a	
2008	George Airport	South Africa	Port Elizabeth Airport	South Africa	Cape Town International Airport	South Africa	—N/a		—N/a	
2009	George Airport	South Africa	O.R. Tambo International Airport	South Africa	Cairo International Airport	Egypt	—N/a		—N/a	
2010	Cape Town International Airport	South Africa	Cairo International Airport	Egypt	O.R. Tambo International Airport	South Africa	—N/a		—N/a	
2011	Cape Town International Airport	South Africa	Cairo International Airport	Egypt	Durban International Airport	South Africa	—N/a		—N/a	
2012	Cape Town International Airport	South Africa	Durban International Airport	South Africa	Cairo International Airport	Egypt	Sir Seewoosagur Ramgoolam International Airport	Mauritius	O.R. Tambo International Airport	South Africa
2013	Cape Town International Airport	South Africa	Durban International Airport	South Africa	Sir Seewoosagur Ramgoolam International Airport	Mauritius	Cairo International Airport	Egypt	O.R. Tambo International Airport	South Africa
2014	Sir Seewoosagur Ramgoolam International Airport	Mauritius	Durban International Airport	South Africa	Cape Town International Airport	South Africa	O.R. Tambo International Airport	South Africa	Jomo Kenyatta International Airport	Kenya
2015	Sir Seewoosagur Ramgoolam International Airport	Mauritius	Cape Town International Airport; Durban International Airport	South Africa	O.R. Tambo International Airport	South Africa	—N/a	—N/a		
2016	Sir Seewoosagur Ramgoolam International Airport	Mauritius	Durban International Airport	South Africa	Cape Town International Airport	South Africa	—N/a	—N/a		
2017	Mohammed V International Airport	Morocco	Sir Seewoosagur Ramgoolam International Airport	Mauritius	Durban International Airport	South Africa	—N/a	—N/a		

==== Under 20 million passengers ====
Year	Country	Winner
2017	(South Africa)	George Airport

=== Asia - Pacific ===
==== Over 20 million passengers ====
Year	1st	2nd	3rd	4th	5th
2006	(South Korea) Incheon International Airport	Hong Kong International Airport	(Malaysia) Kuala Lumpur International Airport	—N/a	—N/a
2007	(South Korea) Incheon International Airport	Hong Kong International Airport	Singapore Changi Airport	—N/a	—N/a
2008	(South Korea) Incheon International Airport	Singapore Changi Airport	Hong Kong International Airport	—N/a	—N/a
2009	(South Korea) Incheon International Airport	Singapore Changi Airport	Hong Kong International Airport	—N/a	—N/a
2010	(South Korea) Incheon International Airport	Singapore Changi Airport	Hong Kong International Airport	—N/a	—N/a
2011	(South Korea) Incheon International Airport	Singapore Changi Airport	(China) Beijing Capital International Airport	—N/a	—N/a
2012	(South Korea) Incheon International Airport	Singapore Changi Airport	(China) Beijing Capital International Airport	(India) Indira Gandhi International Airport	Hong Kong International Airport
2013	(South Korea) Incheon International Airport	Singapore Changi Airport	(China) Beijing Capital International Airport	(China) Shanghai Pudong International Airport	(India) Indira Gandhi International Airport
2014	(South Korea) Incheon International Airport	Singapore Changi Airport	(China) Beijing Capital International Airport	(China) Haikou Meilan International Airport	(India) Indira Gandhi International Airport
2015	(South Korea) Incheon International Airport; Singapore Changi Airport	(China) Beijing Capital International Airport (India) Chhatrapati Shivaji International Airport (India) Indira Gandhi International Airport (China) Sanya Phoenix International Airport (China) Shanghai Pudong International Airport	(China) Guangzhou Baiyun International Airport (Taiwan) Taoyuan International Airport (China) Tianjin Binhai International Airport	—N/a	—N/a
2016	(South Korea) Incheon International Airport	(India) Indira Gandhi International Airport (India) Chhatrapati Shivaji International Airport; Singapore Changi Airport	(China) Beijing Capital International Airport (China) Haikou Meilan International Airport	(India) Raja Bhoj International Airport	(India) Chandigarh International Airport
2017	(India) Indira Gandhi International Airport (India) Chhatrapati Shivaji Maharaj International Airport	(China) Beijing Capital International Airport (Indonesia) Ngurah Rai Airport (China) Haikou Meilan International Airport (China) Shanghai Pudong International Airport	(China) Sanya Phoenix International Airport	—N/a	—N/a

==== Under 20 million passengers ====
Year	Winner
2017	(India) Devi Ahilya Bai Holkar Airport

=== Europe ===
==== Over 20 million passengers ====
Year	1st	2nd	3rd	4th	5th
2006	(Switzerland) Zürich Airport	(Belgium) Brussels Airport	(Finland) Helsinki Airport (Portugal) Porto Airport	—N/a	—N/a
2007	(Portugal) Porto Airport	(Switzerland) Zürich Airport	(Finland) Helsinki Airport (Germany) Munich Airport	—N/a	—N/a
2008	(Switzerland) Zürich Airport	(United Kingdom) Southampton Airport	(Portugal) Porto Airport	—N/a	—N/a
2009	(Iceland) Keflavík International Airport	(Switzerland) Zürich Airport	(Portugal) Porto Airport	—N/a	—N/a
2010	Malta International Airport	(Portugal) Porto Airport	(Switzerland) Zürich Airport	—N/a	—N/a
2011	Malta International Airport	(United Kingdom) Edinburgh Airport	(Portugal) Porto Airport	—N/a	—N/a
2012	(Russia) Sheremetyevo International Airport	Malta International Airport	(United Kingdom) Edinburgh Airport	(Iceland) Keflavík International Airport	(Switzerland) Zürich Airport
2013	(Russia) Sheremetyevo International Airport	(Switzerland) Zürich Airport	(Portugal) Porto Airport	(Iceland) Keflavík International Airport	Malta International Airport
2014	(Iceland) Keflavík International Airport	(Russia) Sheremetyevo International Airport	(Portugal) Porto Airport	Malta International Airport	(Switzerland) Zürich Airport
2015	(Russia) Pulkovo Airport (Russia) Sheremetyevo International Airport (Russia) Sochi International Airport	(Republic of Ireland) Dublin Airport; Malta International Airport (Czech Republic) Václav Havel Airport Prague (Switzerland) Zürich Airport	(Denmark) Copenhagen Airport (Iceland) Keflavík International Airport (United Kingdom) Heathrow Airport (Portugal) Porto Airport (Austria) Vienna International Airport	—N/a	—N/a
2016	(Russia) Sochi International Airport	(Russia) Sheremetyevo International Airport	(Republic of Ireland) Dublin Airport; Malta International Airport (Portugal) Porto Airport (Switzerland) Zürich Airport	—N/a	—N/a
2017	(Russia) Sochi International Airport	Malta International Airport (Russia) Sheremetyevo International Airport (Portugal) Porto Airport	(Italy) Leonardo da Vinci–Fiumicino Airport (Switzerland) Zürich Airport	—N/a	—N/a

==== Under 20 million passengers ====
Year	Winner
2017	(Spain) Murcia Airport

=== Latin America & Caribbean ===
==== Over 20 million passengers ====
Year	1st	2nd	3rd	4th	5th
2007	(Ecuador) José Joaquín de Olmedo International Airport	(Costa Rica) Juan Santamaría International Airport	Mexico City International Airport	—N/a	—N/a
2008	(Ecuador) José Joaquín de Olmedo International Airport	(Mexico) Cancún International Airport	(Costa Rica) Juan Santamaría International Airport	—N/a	—N/a
2009	(Mexico) Cancún International Airport	(Ecuador) José Joaquín de Olmedo International Airport	(Barbados) Grantley Adams International Airport	—N/a	—N/a
2010	(Mexico) Cancún International Airport	(Ecuador) José Joaquín de Olmedo International Airport	(Costa Rica) Juan Santamaría International Airport	—N/a	—N/a
2011	(Mexico) Cancún International Airport	(Ecuador) José Joaquín de Olmedo International Airport	(Costa Rica) Juan Santamaría International Airport	—N/a	—N/a
2012	(Mexico) Cancún International Airport	(Ecuador) José Joaquín de Olmedo International Airport	(Jamaica) Sangster International Airport	(Costa Rica) Juan Santamaría International Airport	(Barbados) Grantley Adams International Airport
2013	(Ecuador) José Joaquín de Olmedo International Airport	(Mexico) Cancún International Airport	(Jamaica) Sangster International Airport	(The Bahamas) Lynden Pindling International Airport	(Mexico) Licenciado Gustavo Díaz Ordaz International Airport
2014	(Ecuador) José Joaquín de Olmedo International Airport	(Ecuador) Mariscal Sucre International Airport	(Mexico) Cancún International Airport	(The Bahamas) Lynden Pindling International Airport	(Dominican Republic) Las Américas International Airport
2015	(Ecuador) José Joaquín de Olmedo International Airport	(Ecuador) Mariscal Sucre International Airport	(Mexico) Monterrey International Airport (Dominican Republic) Punta Cana International Airport	—N/a	—N/a
2016	(Ecuador) José Joaquín de Olmedo International Airport	(The Bahamas) Lynden Pindling International Airport (Dominican Republic) Punta Cana International Airport	(Aruba) Queen Beatrix International Airport (Ecuador) Mariscal Sucre International Airport	—N/a	—N/a
2017	(Ecuador) José Joaquín de Olmedo International Airport	(Mexico) Los Cabos International Airport	(The Bahamas) Lynden Pindling International Airport (Dominican Republic) Punta Cana International Airport	—N/a	—N/a

==== Under 20 million passengers ====
Year	Winner
2017	(Mexico) Mazatlán International Airport

=== Middle East ===
Year	1st	2nd	3rd	4th	5th
2006^{a}	(United Arab Emirates) Abu Dhabi International Airport	(South Africa) Cape Town International Airport	(Qatar) Hamad International Airport	—N/a	—N/a
2007	(Israel) Ben Gurion Airport	(Qatar) Hamad International Airport	(United Arab Emirates) Abu Dhabi International Airport	—N/a	—N/a
2008	(Israel) Ben Gurion Airport	(United Arab Emirates) Abu Dhabi International Airport	(Qatar) Hamad International Airport	—N/a	—N/a
2009	(Israel) Ben Gurion Airport	(United Arab Emirates) Dubai International Airport	(United Arab Emirates) Abu Dhabi International Airport	—N/a	—N/a
2010	(United Arab Emirates) Dubai International Airport	(United Arab Emirates) Abu Dhabi International Airport	(Israel) Ben Gurion Airport	—N/a	—N/a
2011	(United Arab Emirates) Dubai International Airport	(United Arab Emirates) Abu Dhabi International Airport	(Israel) Ben Gurion Airport	—N/a	—N/a
2012	(United Arab Emirates) Abu Dhabi International Airport	(United Arab Emirates) Dubai International Airport	(Qatar) Hamad International Airport	(Israel) Ben Gurion Airport	Bahrain International Airport
2013	(United Arab Emirates) Abu Dhabi International Airport	(United Arab Emirates) Dubai International Airport	(Qatar) Hamad International Airport	(Israel) Ben Gurion Airport	(Jordan) Queen Alia International Airport
2014	(Jordan) Queen Alia International Airport	(United Arab Emirates) Abu Dhabi International Airport	(Israel) Ben Gurion Airport	(Qatar) Hamad International Airport	(United Arab Emirates) Dubai International Airport
2015	(Jordan) Queen Alia International Airport	(United Arab Emirates) Abu Dhabi International Airport (Qatar) Hamad International Airport	(Saudi Arabia) King Fahd International Airport (United Arab Emirates) Dubai International Airport (Israel) Ben Gurion Airport	—N/a	—N/a
2016	(United Arab Emirates) Abu Dhabi International Airport	(Jordan) Queen Alia International Airport	(United Arab Emirates) Dubai International Airport	—N/a	—N/a
2017	(United Arab Emirates) Abu Dhabi International Airport	(Jordan) Queen Alia International Airport (Saudi Arabia) Prince Mohammad bin Abdulaziz International Airport	(United Arab Emirates) Dubai International Airport	—N/a	—N/a

^a In 2006, the category was called "Africa - Middle East".

=== North America ===
==== Over 20 million passengers ====
Year	1st	2nd	3rd	4th	5th
2006	(United States) Dallas/Fort Worth International Airport	(Canada) Halifax Stanfield International Airport	(Canada) Ottawa Macdonald–Cartier International Airport (United States) Detroit Metropolitan Wayne County Airport	—N/a	—N/a
2007	(United States) Dallas/Fort Worth International Airport	(Canada) Halifax Stanfield International Airport	(Canada) Ottawa Macdonald–Cartier International Airport	—N/a	—N/a
2008	(Canada) Halifax Stanfield International Airport	(Canada) Ottawa Macdonald–Cartier International Airport	(United States) Austin–Bergstrom International Airport	—N/a	—N/a
2009	(United States) Austin–Bergstrom International Airport	(Canada) Halifax Stanfield International Airport	(Canada) Ottawa Macdonald–Cartier International Airport	—N/a	—N/a
2010	(United States) Indianapolis International Airport	(Canada) Ottawa Macdonald–Cartier International Airport	(United States) Austin–Bergstrom International Airport	—N/a	—N/a
2011	(Canada) Ottawa Macdonald–Cartier International Airport	(United States) Indianapolis International Airport	(Canada) Halifax Stanfield International Airport	—N/a	—N/a
2012	(United States) Indianapolis International Airport	(Canada) Ottawa Macdonald–Cartier International Airport	(United States) Tampa International Airport	(United States) Sacramento International Airport	(United States) Jacksonville International Airport
2013	(United States) Indianapolis International Airport	(Canada) Ottawa Macdonald–Cartier International Airport	(United States) Tampa International Airport	(United States) Sacramento International Airport	(United States) Jacksonville International Airport
2014	(United States) Indianapolis International Airport	(United States) Tampa International Airport	(United States) Jacksonville International Airport	(United States) Sacramento International Airport	(Canada) Ottawa Macdonald–Cartier International Airport
2015	(United States) Indianapolis International Airport	(United States) Dallas Love Field (United States) Gerald R. Ford International Airport (United States) Jacksonville International Airport (Canada) Ottawa Macdonald–Cartier International Airport (United States) Tampa International Airport	(United States) Austin–Bergstrom International Airport (United States) Detroit Metropolitan Wayne County Airport (United States) Sacramento International Airport (United States) San Antonio International Airport (Canada) Billy Bishop Toronto City Airport	—N/a	—N/a
2016	(United States) Indianapolis International Airport (United States) Jacksonville International Airport (Canada) Billy Bishop Toronto City Airport	(United States) El Paso International Airport (Canada) Ottawa Macdonald–Cartier International Airport (United States) Tampa International Airport	(United States) Austin–Bergstrom International Airport (United States) Dallas Love Field (Canada) Edmonton International Airport (Canada) Halifax Stanfield International Airport (United States) San Antonio International Airport (Canada) Winnipeg James Armstrong Richardson International Airport	—N/a	—N/a
2017	(United States) Indianapolis International Airport (United States) Jacksonville International Airport	(United States) El Paso International Airport (Canada) Ottawa Macdonald–Cartier International Airport (Canada) Billy Bishop Toronto City Airport	(United States) Austin–Bergstrom International Airport (United States) John Glenn Columbus International Airport (United States) Dallas Love Field (Canada) Edmonton International Airport (Canada) Halifax Stanfield International Airport (United States) Pittsburgh International Airport (United States) San Antonio International Airport (United States) San Jose International Airport (United States) Tampa International Airport	—N/a	—N/a

==== Under 20 million passengers ====
Year	Winner
2017	(United States) Portland International Jetport

== Best Airport by Size ==
=== Over 40 million ===
Year	1st	2nd	3rd	4th	5th
2006	Hong Kong International Airport	(United States) Dallas/Fort Worth International Airport	(United States) Denver International Airport	—N/a	—N/a
2007	Hong Kong International Airport	(United States) Dallas/Fort Worth International Airport	(United States) Denver International Airport	—N/a	—N/a
2008	Hong Kong International Airport	(United States) Dallas/Fort Worth International Airport	(China) Beijing Capital International Airport	—N/a	—N/a
2009	Hong Kong International Airport	(China) Beijing Capital International Airport	(United States) Denver International Airport	—N/a	—N/a
2010	Hong Kong International Airport	(China) Beijing Capital International Airport	(United Arab Emirates) Dubai International Airport	—N/a	—N/a
2011	Singapore Changi Airport	(China) Beijing Capital International Airport	Hong Kong International Airport	—N/a	—N/a
2012	Singapore Changi Airport	(China) Beijing Capital International Airport	Hong Kong International Airport	(China) Shanghai Pudong International Airport	(China) Guangzhou Baiyun International Airport
2013	Singapore Changi Airport	(China) Beijing Capital International Airport	(China) Shanghai Pudong International Airport	Hong Kong International Airport	(China) Guangzhou Baiyun International Airport
2014	(South Korea) Incheon International Airport	Singapore Changi Airport	(China) Beijing Capital International Airport	(China) Shanghai Pudong International Airport	Hong Kong International Airport
2015	(South Korea) Incheon International Airport; Singapore Changi Airport	(China) Shanghai Pudong International Airport (China) Beijing Capital International Airport	(China) Guangzhou Baiyun International Airport	—N/a	—N/a
2016	(South Korea) Incheon International Airport	(India) Indira Gandhi International Airport (India) Chhatrapati Shivaji International Airport; Singapore Changi Airport	(China) Beijing Capital International Airport	—N/a	—N/a
2017	(India) Indira Gandhi International Airport	(China) Beijing Capital International Airport	(Taiwan) Taipei Taoyuan Airport	—N/a	—N/a

=== 25-40 million ===
Year	1st	2nd	3rd	4th	5th
2006	(South Korea) Incheon International Airport	Singapore Changi Airport	(United States) Detroit Metropolitan Wayne County Airport	—N/a	—N/a
2007	(South Korea) Incheon International Airport	Singapore Changi Airport	(United States) Detroit Metropolitan Wayne County Airport	—N/a	—N/a
2008	(South Korea) Incheon International Airport	Singapore Changi Airport	(United States) Minneapolis–Saint Paul International Airport	—N/a	—N/a
2009	(South Korea) Incheon International Airport	Singapore Changi Airport	(Japan) Narita International Airport	—N/a	—N/a
2010	(South Korea) Incheon International Airport	Singapore Changi Airport	(China) Shanghai Pudong International Airport	—N/a	—N/a
2011	(South Korea) Incheon International Airport	(India) Indira Gandhi International Airport	(India) Chhatrapati Shivaji International Airport	—N/a	—N/a
2012	(South Korea) Incheon International Airport	(India) Indira Gandhi International Airport	(India) Chhatrapati Shivaji International Airport	(Japan) Narita International Airport	(China) Shanghai Hongqiao International Airport
2013	(South Korea) Incheon International Airport	(India) Indira Gandhi International Airport	(Taiwan) Taoyuan International Airport	(China) Shanghai Hongqiao International Airport	(India) Chhatrapati Shivaji International Airport
2014	(India) Indira Gandhi International Airport	(Taiwan) Taoyuan International Airport	(China) Chongqing Jiangbei International Airport	(China) Shanghai Hongqiao International Airport	(India) Chhatrapati Shivaji International Airport
2015	(India) Indira Gandhi International Airport (India) Chhatrapati Shivaji International Airport	(Taiwan) Taoyuan International Airport	(China) Shanghai Hongqiao International Airport	—N/a	—N/a
2016	(Taiwan) Taoyuan International Airport	(China) Shenzhen Bao'an International Airport	(China) Hangzhou Xiaoshan International Airport	—N/a	—N/a
2017	(China) Chongqing Jiangbei International Airport	(South Korea) Gimpo International Airport	(Japan) Narita International Airport	—N/a	—N/a

=== 15-25 million ===
Year	1st	2nd	3rd	4th	5th
2006	(Malaysia) Kuala Lumpur International Airport	(United States) San Diego International Airport	(Switzerland) Zürich Airport	—N/a	—N/a
2007	(Malaysia) Kuala Lumpur International Airport	(United States) San Diego International Airport	(Switzerland) Zürich Airport	—N/a	—N/a
2008	(Taiwan) Taoyuan International Airport	(Switzerland) Zürich Airport	(United States) San Diego International Airport	—N/a	—N/a
2009	(United States) Baltimore–Washington International Airport	(Taiwan) Taoyuan International Airport	(China) Shenzhen Bao'an International Airport	—N/a	—N/a
2010	(South Korea) Gimpo International Airport	(India) Chhatrapati Shivaji International Airport	(Canada) Vancouver International Airport	—N/a	—N/a
2011	(South Korea) Gimpo International Airport	(China) Chongqing Jiangbei International Airport	(China) Hangzhou Xiaoshan International Airport	—N/a	—N/a
2012	(South Korea) Gimpo International Airport	(China) Chongqing Jiangbei International Airport	(Taiwan) Taoyuan International Airport	(China) Hangzhou Xiaoshan International Airport	(United States) Tampa International Airport
2013	(South Korea) Gimpo International Airport	(China) Chongqing Jiangbei International Airport	(United States) Tampa International Airport	(United States) Salt Lake City International Airport	(Switzerland) Zürich Airport
2014	(South Korea) Gimpo International Airport	(China) Wuhan Tianhe International Airport	(China) Hangzhou Xiaoshan International Airport	(Mexico) Cancún International Airport	(United States) Tampa International Airport
2015	(South Korea) Gimpo International Airport	(China) Wuhan Tianhe International Airport	(Indonesia) Ngurah Rai International Airport	—N/a	—N/a
2016	(China) Haikou Meilan International Airport	(China) Sanya Phoenix International Airport (South Korea) Gimpo International Airport	(Indonesia) Ngurah Rai International Airport	—N/a	—N/a
2017	(Indonesia) Ngurah Rai International Airport (China) Haikou Meilan International Airport (China) Sanya Phoenix International Airport	(India) Kempegowda International Airport	(India) Chennai International Airport (Indonesia) Juanda International Airport	—N/a	—N/a

=== 5-15 million ===
Year	1st	2nd	3rd	4th	5th
2006	(Japan) Chūbu Centrair International Airport	(Australia) Adelaide Airport	(Finland) Helsinki Airport (New Zealand) Christchurch International Airport	—N/a	—N/a
2007	(Japan) Chūbu Centrair International Airport	(Israel) Ben Gurion Airport	(New Zealand) Auckland Airport	—N/a	—N/a
2008	(Japan) Chūbu Centrair International Airport	(Israel) Ben Gurion Airport	(United States) Austin–Bergstrom International Airport	—N/a	—N/a
2009	(India) Rajiv Gandhi International Airport	(United States) Austin–Bergstrom International Airport	(Mexico) Cancún International Airport	—N/a	—N/a
2010	(India) Rajiv Gandhi International Airport	(Japan) Chūbu Centrair International Airport	(United States) Indianapolis International Airport	—N/a	—N/a
2011	(Japan) Chūbu Centrair International Airport	(Mexico) Cancún International Airport	(India) Rajiv Gandhi International Airport	—N/a	—N/a
2012	(Japan) Chūbu Centrair International Airport	(India) Rajiv Gandhi International Airport	(China) Tianjin Binhai International Airport	(China) Wuhan Tianhe International Airport	(China) Sanya Phoenix International Airport
2013	(China) Haikou Meilan International Airport	(India) Rajiv Gandhi International Airport	(China) Tianjin Binhai International Airport	(China) Wuhan Tianhe International Airport	(China) Harbin Taiping International Airport
2014	(China) Haikou Meilan International Airport	(China) Sanya Phoenix International Airport	(India) Rajiv Gandhi International Airport	(China) Tianjin Binhai International Airport	(China) Changchun Longjia International Airport
2015	(China) Sanya Phoenix International Airport	(China) Tianjin Binhai International Airport	(India) Rajiv Gandhi International Airport	—N/a	—N/a
2016	(India) Rajiv Gandhi International Airport (China) Tianjin Binhai International Airport	(China) Changchun Longjia International Airport (China) Hohhot Baita International Airport	(Jordan) Queen Alia International Airport (Thailand) Chiang Mai International Airport (India) Cochin International Airport (United States) Indianapolis International Airport (United States) Jacksonville International Airport	—N/a	—N/a
2017	(India) Rajiv Gandhi International Airport	(Indonesia) Sultan Aji Muhammad Sulaiman Airport (China) Hohhot Baita International Airport	(India) Cochin International Airport (India) Netaji Subhas Chandra Bose International Airport (India) Pune Airport	—N/a	—N/a

=== Fewer than 5 million ===
Year	1st	2nd	3rd	4th	5th
2006	(Canada) Halifax Stanfield International Airport	(Canada) Ottawa Macdonald–Cartier International Airport	(Portugal) Porto Airport	—N/a	—N/a
2007	(Canada) Halifax Stanfield International Airport	(Canada) Ottawa Macdonald–Cartier International Airport	(Ecuador) José Joaquín de Olmedo International Airport	—N/a	—N/a
2008	(Canada) Halifax Stanfield International Airport	(Canada) Ottawa Macdonald–Cartier International Airport	(Ecuador) José Joaquín de Olmedo International Airport	—N/a	—N/a
2009	(Canada) Halifax Stanfield International Airport	(Canada) Ottawa Macdonald–Cartier International Airport	(United States) Portland International Jetport	—N/a	—N/a
2010	(Canada) Ottawa Macdonald–Cartier International Airport	(Canada) Halifax Stanfield International Airport	(Ecuador) José Joaquín de Olmedo International Airport	—N/a	—N/a
2011	(Ecuador) José Joaquín de Olmedo International Airport	(Canada) Ottawa Macdonald–Cartier International Airport	(Canada) Halifax Stanfield International Airport	—N/a	—N/a
2012^{b}	(China) Hohhot Baita International Airport	(Ecuador) José Joaquín de Olmedo International Airport	(Canada) Ottawa Macdonald–Cartier International Airport	(Thailand) Chiang Mai International Airport	(Canada) Winnipeg James Armstrong Richardson International Airport
2013^{b}	(China) Changchun Longjia International Airport	(Ecuador) José Joaquín de Olmedo International Airport	(Canada) Ottawa Macdonald–Cartier International Airport	(Canada) Halifax Stanfield International Airport	(United States) Gerald R. Ford International Airport
2014^{b}	(Ecuador) José Joaquín de Olmedo International Airport	(Mauritius) Sir Seewoosagur Ramgoolam International Airport	(Canada) Ottawa Macdonald–Cartier International Airport	(The Bahamas) Lynden Pindling International Airport	(India) Sardar Vallabhbhai Patel International Airport
2015^{b}	(India) Jaipur International Airport	(India) Chaudhary Charan Singh International Airport	(Ecuador) José Joaquín de Olmedo International Airport	—N/a	—N/a
2016	(Ecuador) José Joaquín de Olmedo International Airport (India) Jaipur International Airport (Russia) Sochi International Airport	(India) Srinagar International Airport (Canada) Billy Bishop Toronto City Airport	(Malaysia) Langkawi International Airport (Canada) Ottawa Macdonald–Cartier International Airport	—N/a	—N/a
2017	(India) Chaudhary Charan Singh International Airport	(Ecuador) José Joaquín de Olmedo International Airport	(Indonesia) Husein Sastranegara International Airport	—N/a	—N/a

^b Since 2012 the category is called "2-5 million".

== Best Airport by Size and Region ==
Year	Africa	Europe					Latin America & Caribbean		North America					Asia Pacific					Middle East
Year	Passengers on million per year																		
Year	5–15	2–5	5–15	15–25	25-40	40<	2–5	5–15	2–5	5–15	15–25	25-40	40<	2–5	5–15	15–25	25-40	40<	5–15
2017	(Morocco) Mohammed V International Airport	(United Kingdom) Newcastle Airport	(Russia) Sochi International Airport	(Greece) Athens International Airport	(Russia) Sheremetyevo International Airport	(Italy) Leonardo da Vinci–Fiumicino Airport	(Ecuador) José Joaquín de Olmedo International Airport	(Dominican Republic) Punta Cana International Airport	(Canada) Ottawa Macdonald–Cartier International Airport	(United States) Indianapolis International Airport	(United States) Tampa International Airport	(United States) Minneapolis–Saint Paul International Airport	(Canada) Toronto Pearson International Airport	(India) Chaudhary Charan Singh International Airport	(India) Rajiv Gandhi International Airport	(Indonesia) Ngurah Rai International Airport	(China) Chongqing Jiangbei International Airport	(India) Chhatrapati Shivaji Maharaj International Airport	(Saudi Arabia) Prince Mohammad bin Abdulaziz International Airport

== Best Improvement ==
Year	Africa	Asia Pacific	Europe	Latin America & Caribbean	Middle East	North America
2007	(United Kingdom) Aberdeen Airport					
2008	(China) Beijing Capital International Airport					
2009	(Egypt) Cairo International Airport	(India) Indira Gandhi International Airport	(Portugal) João Paulo II Airport	(Mexico) Cancún International Airport	(United Arab Emirates) Abu Dhabi International Airport	(United States) Cleveland Hopkins International Airport
2010	(South Africa) Cape Town International Airport	(China) Shanghai Hongqiao International Airport	(United Kingdom) Bournemouth Airport	(Costa Rica) Juan Santamaría International Airport	(United Arab Emirates) Dubai International Airport	(Canada) Vancouver International Airport
2011	(South Africa) East London Airport	(China) Chongqing Jiangbei International Airport	(Spain) Palma de Mallorca Airport	(Ecuador) José Joaquín de Olmedo International Airport	(United Arab Emirates) Dubai International Airport	(Canada) Montréal–Pierre Elliott Trudeau International Airport
2012	(Kenya) Moi International Airport	(China) Sanya Phoenix International Airport	(Portugal) Faro Airport	(Dominican Republic) Las Américas International Airport	(United Arab Emirates) Abu Dhabi International Airport	(Canada) Winnipeg James Armstrong Richardson International Airport
2013	(South Africa) East London Airport	(India) Netaji Subhas Chandra Bose International Airport	(Sweden) Göteborg Landvetter Airport	(The Bahamas) Lynden Pindling International Airport	(Jordan) Queen Alia International Airport	(United States) San Antonio International Airport
2014	(Mauritius) Sir Seewoosagur Ramgoolam International Airport	(India) Netaji Subhash Chandra Bose International Airport	(Russia) Pulkovo Airport	(Dominican Republic) Las Américas International Airport	(Jordan) Queen Alia International Airport	(United States) San Antonio International Airport
2015	(Kenya) Jomo Kenyatta International Airport	(Indonesia) Ngurah Rai International Airport	(Turkey) Istanbul Atatürk Airport	(Jamaica) Norman Manley International Airport	(Saudi Arabia) King Fahd International Airport	(Canada) Saskatoon John G. Diefenbaker International Airport
2016	(South Africa) Bloemfontein Airport	(Indonesia) Sultan Hasanuddin International Airport	(Poland) John Paul II International Airport Kraków–Balice	(Aruba) Queen Beatrix International Airport	(United Arab Emirates) Abu Dhabi International Airport	(United States) John Glenn Columbus International Airport
2017	(Kenya) Jomo Kenyatta International Airport	(India) Sardar Vallabhbhai Patel International Airport	(Croatia) Zagreb Airport	(Brazil) Pampulha–Carlos Drummond de Andrade Airport	(United Arab Emirates) Dubai International Airport	(United States) Cleveland Hopkins International Airport

== Best Domestic Airport ==
This award recognises airports, based on the results for overall satisfaction as rated solely by domestic passengers. The award has been replaced with the "Best Regional Airport" award in 2010.

Year	1st	2nd	3rd
2006	(United States) Austin–Bergstrom International Airport	(Canada) Halifax Stanfield International Airport	(Canada) Ottawa Macdonald–Cartier International Airport
2007	(Canada) Halifax Stanfield International Airport	(United States) Austin–Bergstrom International Airport	(Canada) Ottawa Macdonald–Cartier International Airport
2008	(Japan) Chūbu Centrair International Airport	(Canada) Halifax Stanfield International Airport	(Canada) Ottawa Macdonald–Cartier International Airport

== Best Regional Airport ==
This award, replacing the "Best Domestic Airport" in 2010, has been classified since 2012 as recognising only airports with 2 million passengers or less.

Year	Africa	Europe	Latin America & Caribbean	North America	Asia Pacific
2010	(South Africa) George Airport	(United Kingdom) Humberside Airport	(Barbados) Grantley Adams International Airport	(Canada) Québec City Jean Lesage International Airport	—N/a
2011	(South Africa) Upington Airport	(Iceland) Keflavík International Airport	(Mexico) Mazatlán International Airport	(Canada) Québec City Jean Lesage International Airport	—N/a
2012	(South Africa) Upington Airport	(North Macedonia) Skopje "Alexander the Great" Airport	—N/a	(Canada) Victoria International Airport	—N/a
2013	(South Africa) Upington Airport	(North Macedonia) Skopje "Alexander the Great" Airport	(Mexico) Mazatlán International Airport	(Canada) Québec City Jean Lesage International Airport	(India) Netaji Subhas Chandra Bose International Airport
2014	(South Africa) Upington Airport	(Spain) Murcia–San Javier Airport	(Mexico) Bachigualato Federal International Airport	(Canada) Victoria International Airport	(Malaysia) Langkawi International Airport
2015	(South Africa) Upington Airport	(North Macedonia) Skopje "Alexander the Great" Airport	(Mexico) Bachigualato Federal International Airport	(United States) Portland International Jetport	—N/a

== Airport People Awards ==
This award recognizes those airports which have been rated by passengers as having the most courteous and helpful airport, airline and security staff.

Year	Africa - Middle East	Americas	Asia Pacific	Europe
2006	(United Arab Emirates) Abu Dhabi International Airport	(Canada) Halifax Stanfield International Airport	(South Korea) Incheon International Airport	(Belgium) Brussels Airport
2007	—N/a	(Canada) Halifax Stanfield International Airport	(South Korea) Incheon International Airport	(United Kingdom) Southampton Airport
2008	—N/a	(Canada) Halifax Stanfield International Airport	(South Korea) Incheon International Airport	(United Kingdom) Southampton Airport
