= Museum of Korean Culture =

Museum in Incheon, South Korea

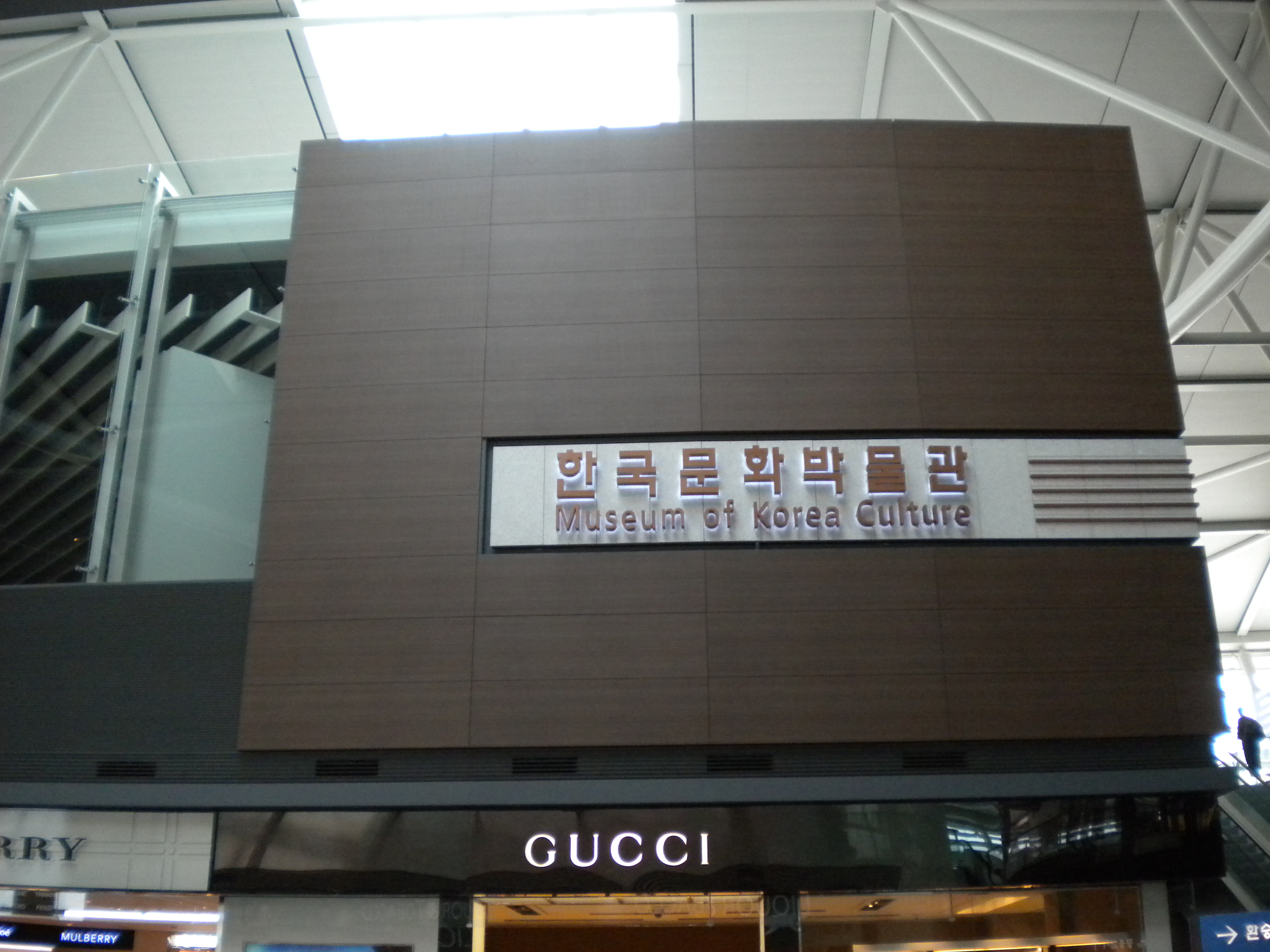
- Location: Concourse 4F; Incheon International Airport; Incheon, South Korea
- Coordinates: 37.449771°N 126.450461°E
- Type: Culture

The Museum of Korean Culture is located in Concourse 4F in Incheon International Airport in Incheon, South Korea. It houses artifacts and art of cultural significance to Korea. Displays include royal culture, traditional arts, printing, and Hangul (the Korean alphabet), traditional music, Buddhist and Confucian artifacts, garments from the Joseon Dynasty, and items and clothing from daily Korean life. Several artifacts at the museum are recognized by the UNESCO World Heritage.

The exhibits include:

- The Great Dharani Sutra of Immaculate and Pure Light (Korean: 무구정광대다라니경; Hanja: 無垢淨光大陀羅尼經; RR: Mugu jeonggwang dae darani-gyeong) (Hyakumantō Darani), the oldest known wooden slab print in the world dating back to the eighth century, discovered in 1966
- A replica of Jikji, the world’s oldest existing book published by movable metal type, create during the Goryeo Dynasty in 1377
- Yongbieocheonga (Songs of the Dragons Flying to Heaven) and Worin cheongangjigok (Songs of the Moon's Reflection on a Thousand Rivers), two of the earliest works printed in Hangul
- Janggu (a double-headed drum pinched at the middle), Daegeum (a large transverse bamboo flute), and Buk (a drum), via a media arts system
