= Gwahae-dong =

- Country: South Korea

Korean name
- Hangul: 과해동
- Hanja: 果海洞
- RR: Gwahae-dong
- MR: Kwahae-dong

Gwahae-dong (Korean: 과해동) is a dong (neighborhood) of Gangseo District, Seoul, South Korea. It is a legal dong (법정동 法定洞) managed by its administrative dong (행정동 行政洞), Gonghang-dong.

The Aviation and Railway Accident Investigation Board (ARAIB) has its FDR/CVR Analysis and Wreckage Laboratory on the property of Gimpo International Airport in Gwahae-dong.

== See also ==
- Administrative divisions of South Korea
