= Ogok-dong =

- Country: South Korea

Korean name
- Hangul: 오곡동
- Hanja: 五谷洞
- RR: Ogok-dong
- MR: Ogok-tong

Ogok-dong (Korean: 오곡동) is a dong (neighbourhood) of Gangseo District, Seoul, South Korea. It is a legal dong (법정동 法定洞) managed by its administrative dong (행정동 行政洞), Gonghang-dong.

== See also ==
- Administrative divisions of South Korea
