= Korean Air Flight 8702 =

1998 aviation accident in South Korea

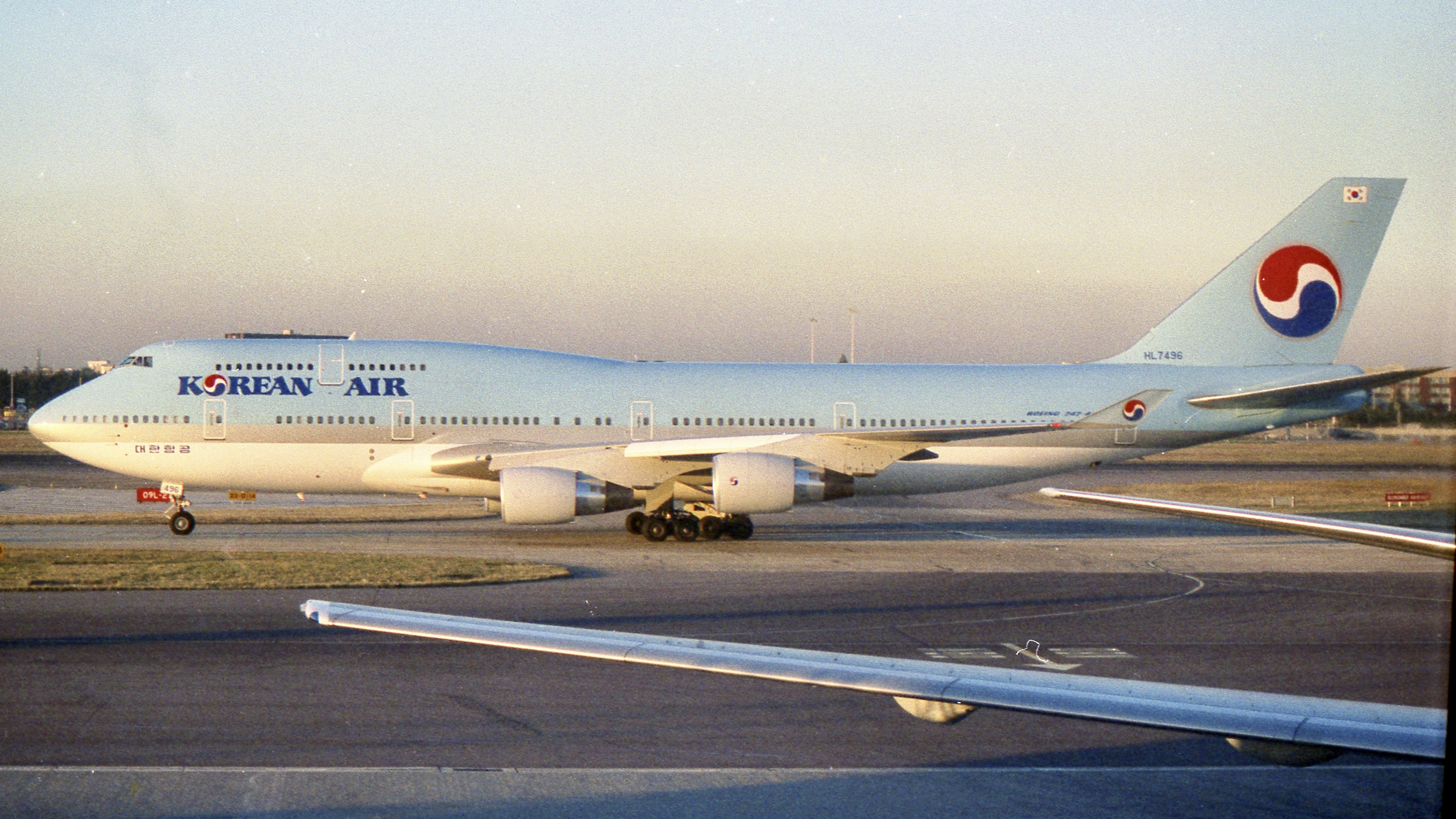
- HL7496, the aircraft involved in the accident

Accident
- Date: 5 August 1998
- Summary: Runway overrun due to pilot error
- Site: Gimpo International Airport, Seoul, South Korea

Aircraft
- Aircraft type: Boeing 747-4B5
- Operator: Korean Air
- IATA flight No.: KE8702
- ICAO flight No.: KAL8702
- Call sign: KOREAN AIR 8702
- Registration: HL7496
- Flight origin: Narita International Airport, Tokyo, Japan
- Destination: Gimpo International Airport, Seoul, South Korea
- Occupants: 395
- Passengers: 379
- Crew: 16
- Fatalities: 0
- Injuries: 25
- Survivors: 395

Korean Air Flight 8702, operated by a Boeing 747-400, departed Tokyo, Narita International Airport on 5 August 1998 at 16:50 for a flight to Seoul, scheduled to arrive there at 19:20. Bad weather, including heavy rainfall, at Seoul forced the flight crew to divert to Jeju. The aircraft took off from Jeju at 21:07 for Seoul. The flight was cleared to land on runway 14R with a crosswind component as the wind was from 220 degrees at 22 knots. Upon touchdown, the aircraft rolled off the runway. The aircraft slid into a ditch. The undercarriage was destroyed by the impact and the fuselage split. After the accident, the inside of the aircraft caught fire, but all the occupants were able to evacuate the aircraft.

== Aircraft ==
The aircraft involved was a Boeing 747-4B5, registered as HL7496, delivered to Korean Air on 27 June 1996. Two years and two months old, it was the 21st 747-400 delivered to Korean Air and one of 27 in the fleet at the time of the accident. With line number 1083 and Construction Number (MSN) 26400, it had not been involved in any serious incidents in the time leading up to the accident.

The aircraft involved was the fourth of five Boeing 747s ( 1 -2B5(B), 1 -230(B), 1 -3B5, this -4B5 and 1 -2B5(F) ) to be written off by Korean Air in a span of 15 years.

== Accident ==
Korean Air flight 8702 was a scheduled flight from Tokyo, Narita International Airport to Seoul, Gimpo International Airport. Due to poor weather, the crew diverted to Jeju International Airport. Upon landing the aircraft was towed to the main terminal and the passengers temporarily disembarked into the terminal. Two hours later the passengers re-boarded the aircraft for the 1 hour flight back to Seoul.

The aircraft took off from Jeju at 21:07 for Seoul. The flight was cleared to land on runway 14R with a crosswind component as the wind was from 220 degrees at 22 knots. Upon touchdown, the captain misused the reverse thrusters in a way the No. 1 engine failed to provide reverse thrust. Coupled with the fact the captain was confused with crosswind conditions and the first officer was preoccupied and not paying attention to the landing, the 747 failed to stop before the end of the runway. The aircraft swerved to the right and slid into a ditch at 50 knots with the fuselage splitting up.
