= Yeomchang-dong =

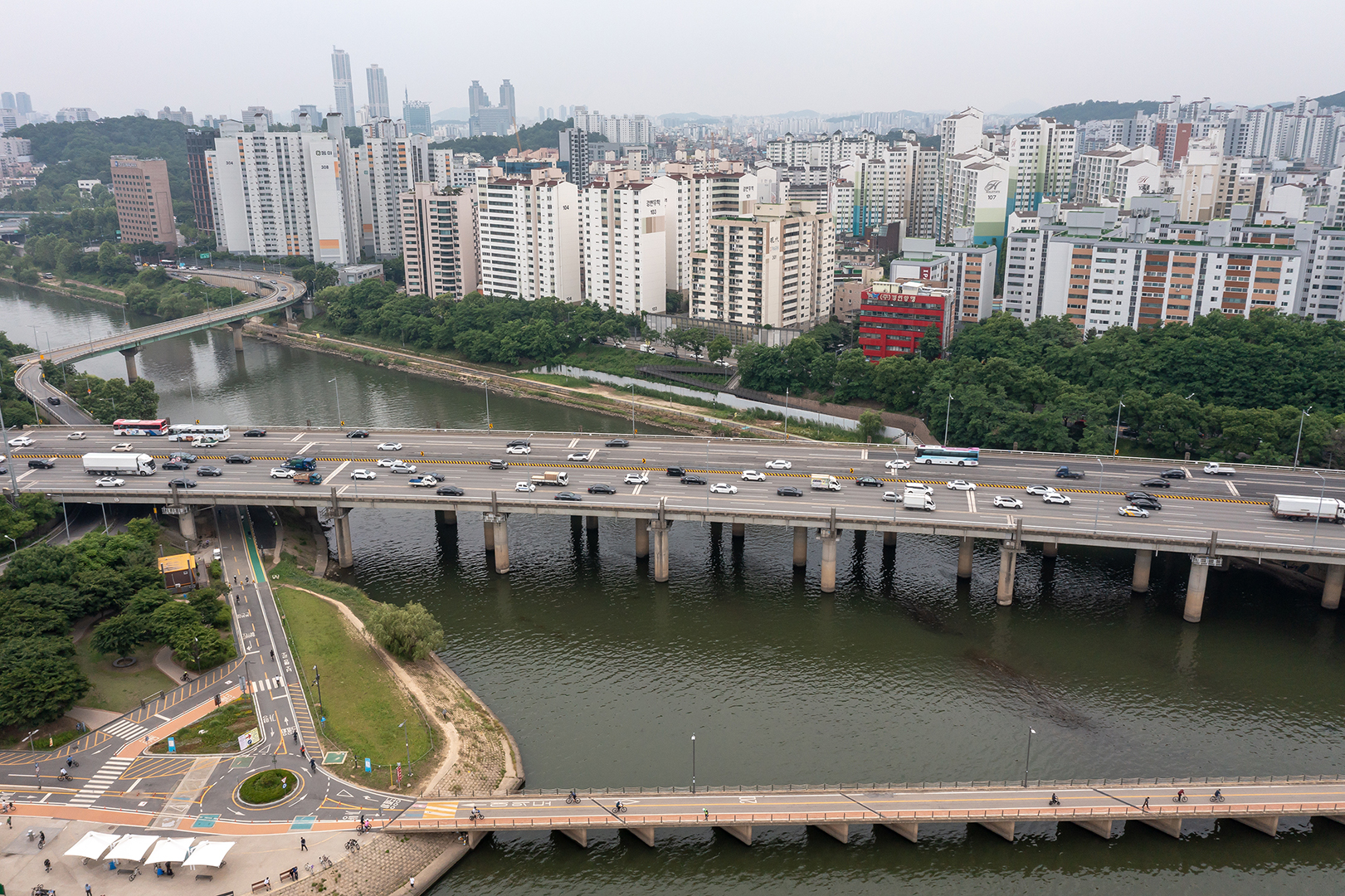
- Aerial view of the Anyangcheon confluence with the Han River in Yeomchang-dong.
- Interactive map of Yeomchang-dong
- Country: South Korea

Area
  - Total: 1.74 km^{2} (0.67 sq mi)

Population (2014)
  - Total: 42,695
  - Density: 20,572/km^{2} (53,280/sq mi)

Korean name
- Hangul: 염창동
- Hanja: 鹽倉洞
- RR: Yeomchang-dong
- MR: Yŏmch'ang-dong

Yeomchang-dong (Korean: 염창동) is a dong (neighbourhood) of Gangseo District, Seoul, South Korea.

== Overview ==
The name Yeomchang-dong is derived from a salt storage facility that once stood in the area during the late Joseon Dynasty. The warehouse was used to store salt transported from salt farms along Korea's western coastline. The presence of this facility led to the area being named Yeomchang, meaning "salt warehouse."

Historically, salt was brought to the Han River estuary using labor from salt farm slaves, primarily from the western and southern coastal regions. While some boats traveled as far inland as Mapo, many slaves attempted to escape during transit. Due to its geographic location, Yeomchang served as a strategic point for unloading salt and securely holding slaves before further transport. From there, some of the laborers were moved upriver to Mapo by boat.

Administratively, during the Joseon period, the area was part of Yangcheon-hyeon. On August 14, 1896, it became Yeomchang-ri in Namsan-myeon, Yangcheon-gun. During the Japanese colonial era, it was reorganized as Yeomchang-ri, Yangdong-myeon, Gimpo-gun, on April 1, 1914. The area was later incorporated into the city of Seoul on January 1, 1963, becoming Yeomchon-dong under the jurisdiction of the Yangdong branch office in Yeongdeungpo District. It was transferred to Gangseo District on January 1, 1977.

== See also ==
- Administrative divisions of South Korea
