= Aviation and Railway Accident Investigation Board =

South Korean government agency

- Aviation and Railway Accident Investigation Board (ARAIB)
- Hangul: 항공·철도 사고 조사 위원회
- Hanja: 航空·鐵道事故調査委員會
- Revised Romanization: Hanggong cheoldo sago josa wiwonhoe
- McCune–Reischauer: Hanggong ch'ŏlto sago chosa wiwŏnhoe

The Aviation and Railway Accident Investigation Board (ARAIB, Korean: 항공·철도사고조사위원회) is an agency of the South Korean government that investigates aviation and railway accidents, subservient to the Ministry of Land, Infrastructure and Transport (MOLIT) and headquartered in Sejong City.

The ARAIB opened on July 10, 2006. It was a merger of the Korea Aviation Accident Investigation Board and the Railway Accident Investigation Board.

== Facilities ==
Its headquarters is in the MOLIT offices in the Sejong Government Office in Sejong City. Its FDR/CVR Analysis and Wreckage Laboratory is on the property of Gimpo International Airport in Gwahae-dong, Gangseo District, Seoul.

Previously the headquarters of the ARAIB was in Gonghang-dong, Gangseo District, in proximity to Gimpo Airport.

== Accidents investigated by the ARAIB ==
- Asiana Airlines Flight 991
- Jeju Air Flight 2216

Also the ARAIB had a support role in the following investigations:

- Asiana Airlines Flight 214

== See also ==
- Korean Maritime Safety Tribunal (maritime accident investigation agency)
- Korea Office of Civil Aviation (South Korean civil aviation agency)
- The Korea Transport Institute (South Korean transport research institute)
