= Banghwa-dong =

Coordinates: 37.576°N 126.814°E

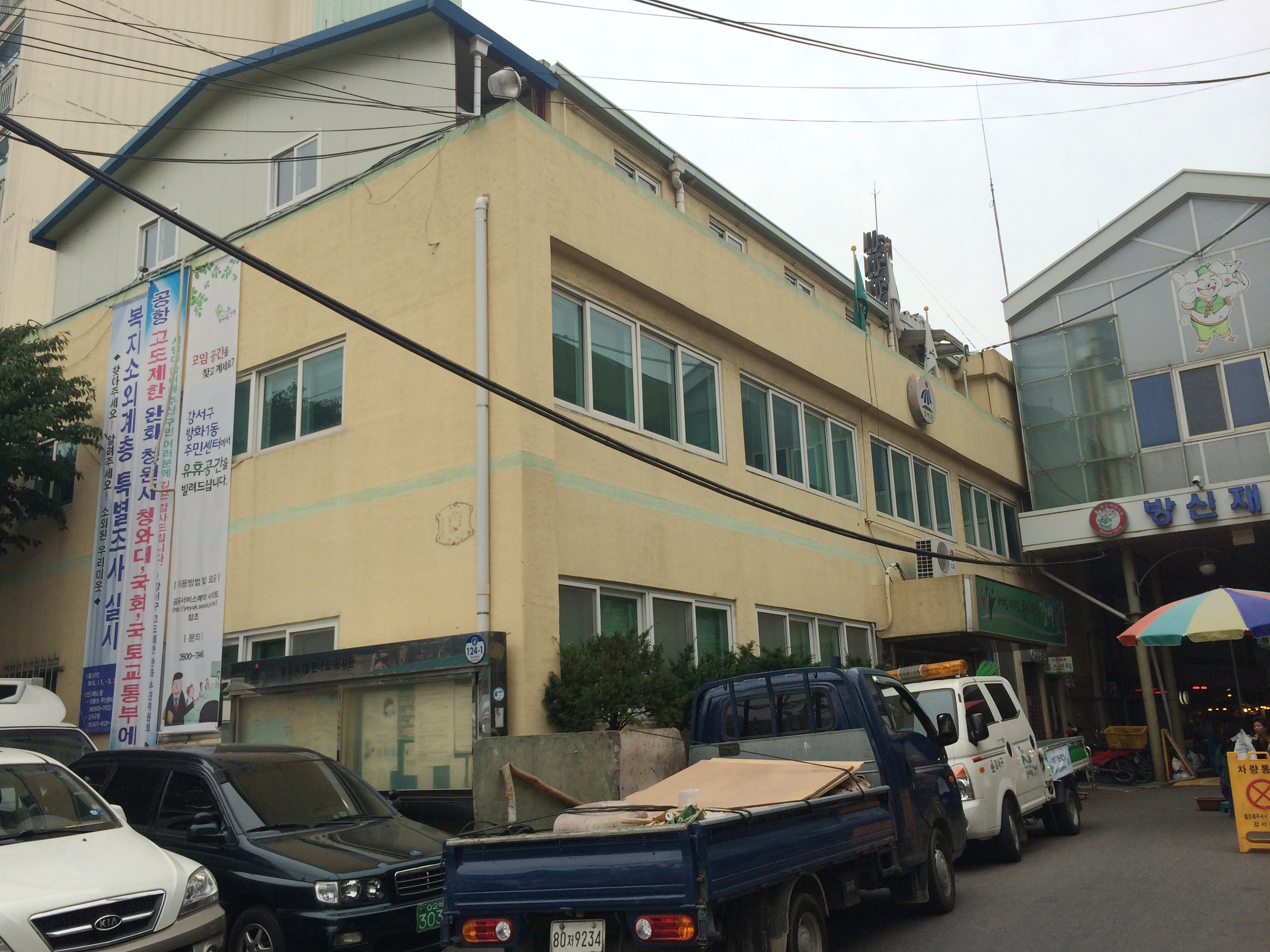
- Banghwa-dong Community Service Center, 2014
- Interactive map of Banghwa-dong
- Country: South Korea

Area
  - Total: 9.83 km^{2} (3.80 sq mi)

Population (2012)
  - Total: 84,743
  - Density: 8,816/km^{2} (22,830/sq mi)

Korean name
- Hangul: 방화동
- Hanja: 傍花洞
- RR: Banghwa-dong
- MR: Panghwa-dong

Banghwa-dong (Korean: 방화동) is a dong (neighborhood) of Gangseo District, Seoul in Seoul, South Korea.

Eastarjet has its headquarters in Banghwa 2-dong.

== Name ==
The dong was named banghwa, because of the flowers that were abundant on the mountain Gaehwasan.

== Gaehwa-dong ==
Gaehwa-dong
- Interactive map of Gaehwa-dong
- Country: South Korea

Korean name
- Hangul: 개화동
- Hanja: 開花洞
- RR: Gaehwa-dong
- MR: Kaehwa-dong

Gaehwa-dong (Korean: 개화동) is a dong (neighborhood) of Gangseo District, Seoul, South Korea. It is a legal dong (법정동) administered under its administrative dong (행정동), Banghwa 2-dong.

=== Famous Gaehwa-dong resident ===
- Jeong Hyeong-don, Comedian

== Education ==
=== 1dong ===
Gaehwa Elementary School

Songhwa Elementary School

Seoul Aero Business High School

Hanseo High School

=== 2dong ===
Banghwa Elementary School

Banghwa Middle School

Konghang High School

== See also ==
- Administrative divisions of South Korea
- Banghwa Bridge
