= Gangseo District, Seoul =

District of Seoul, South Korea

Gangseo
- Autonomous District
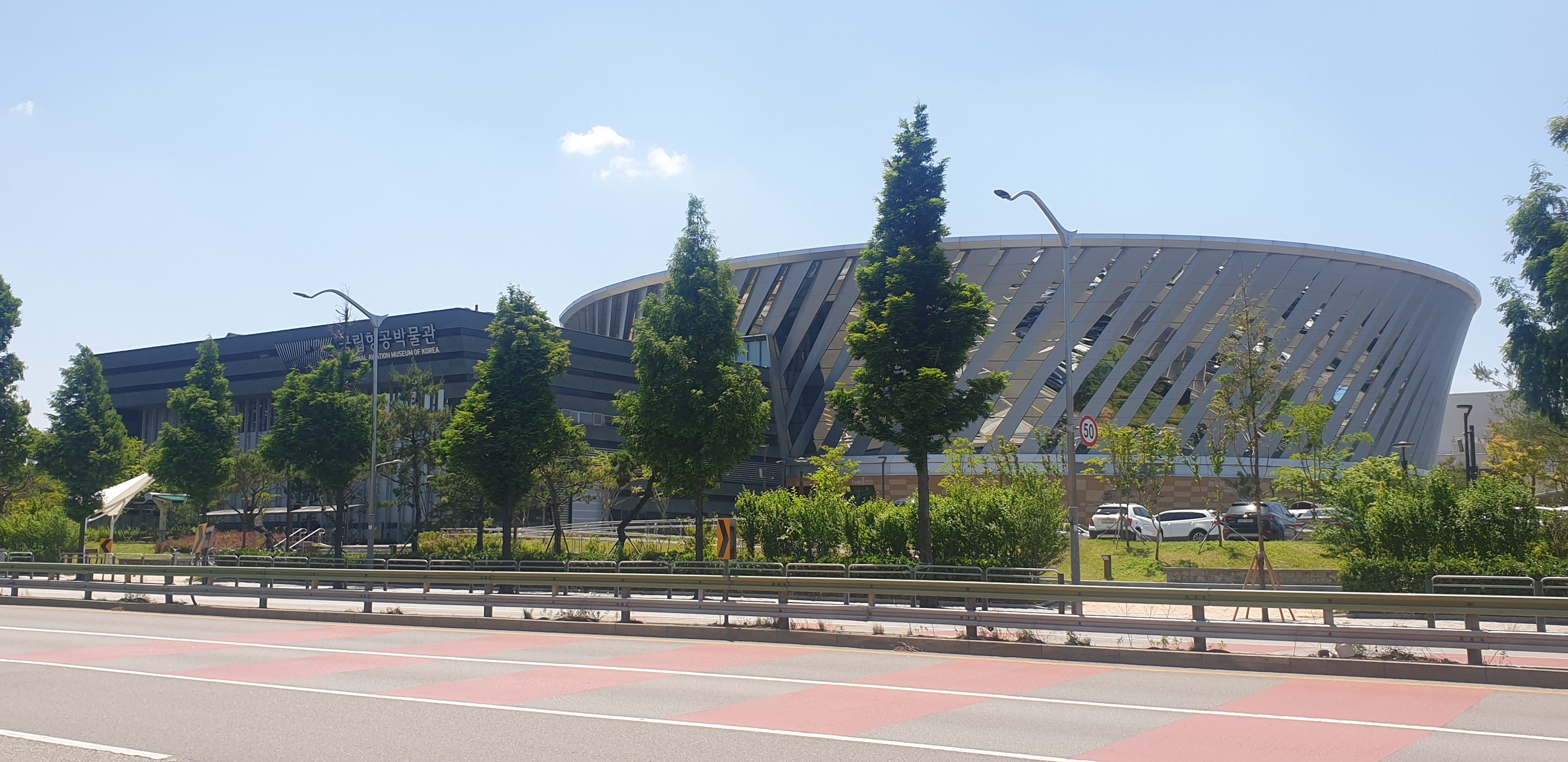
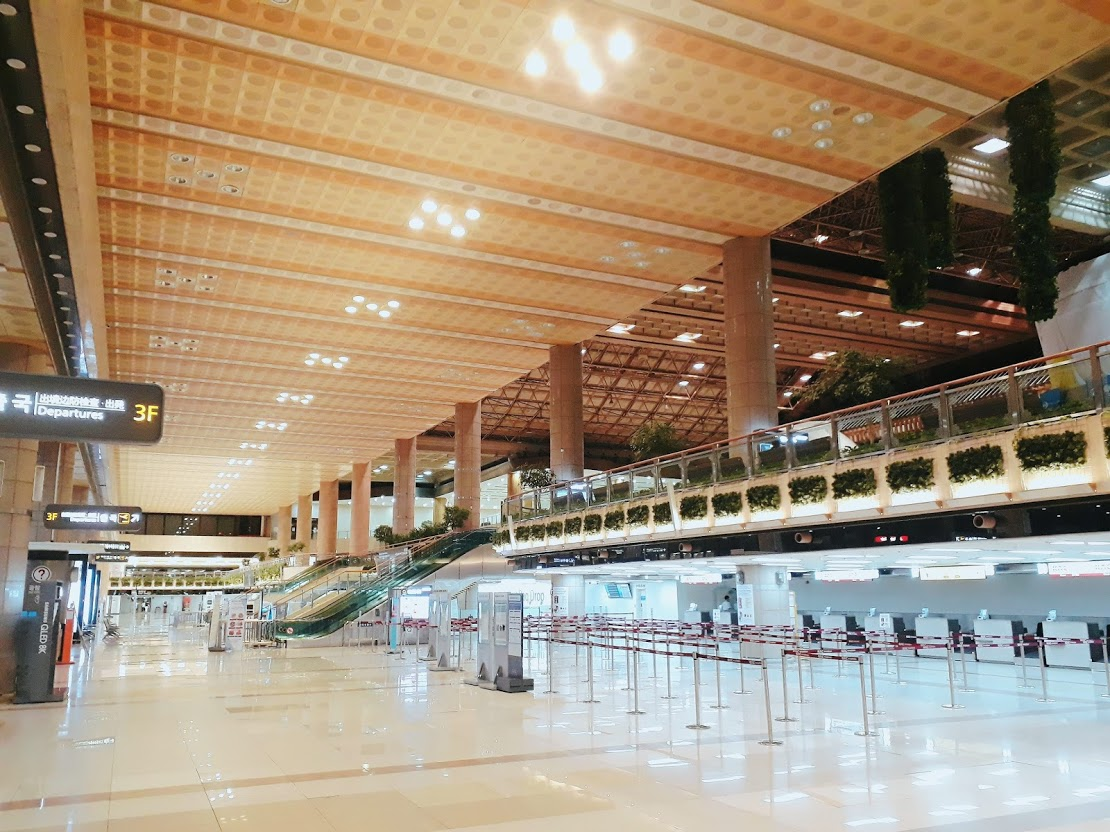
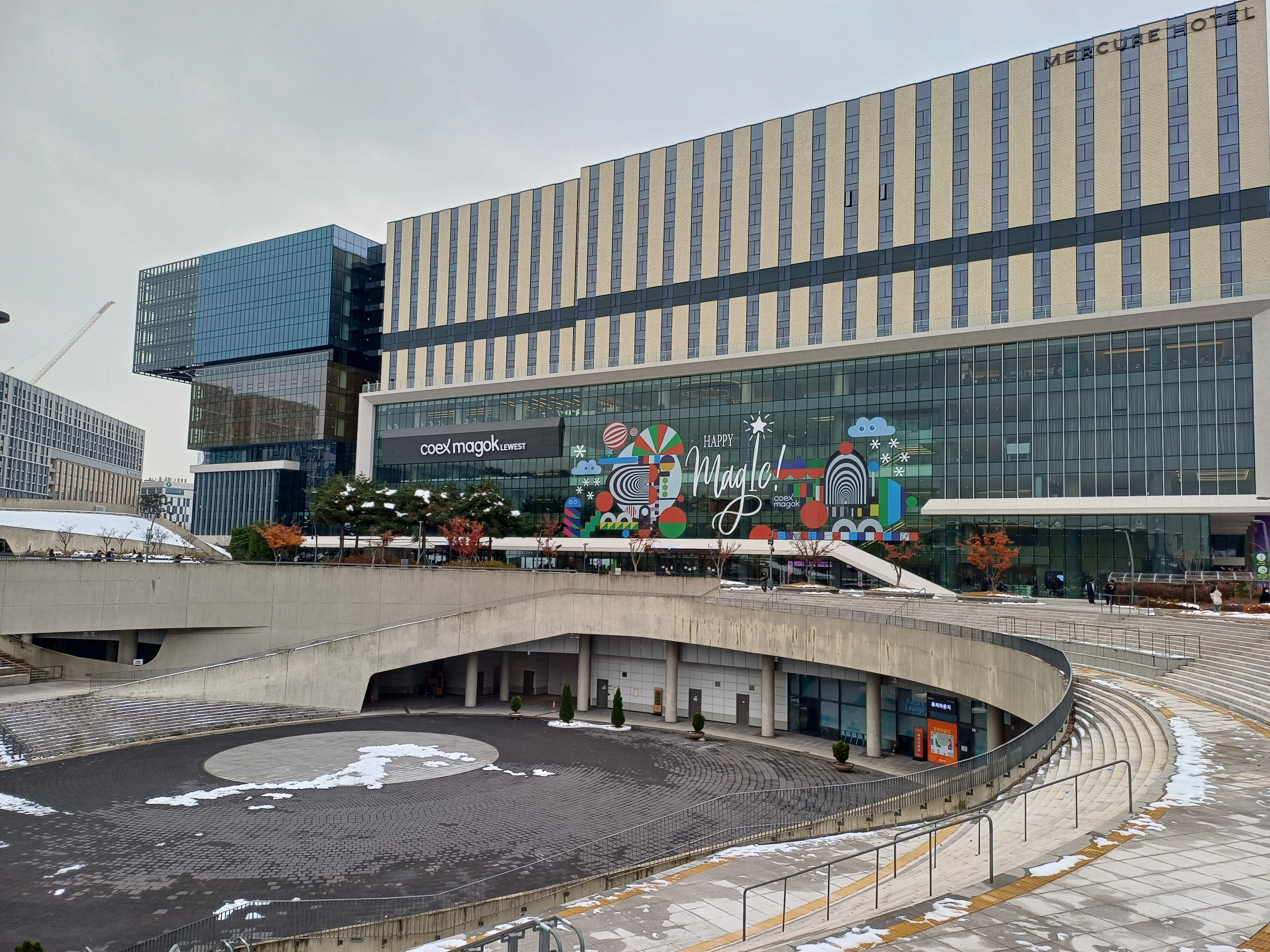
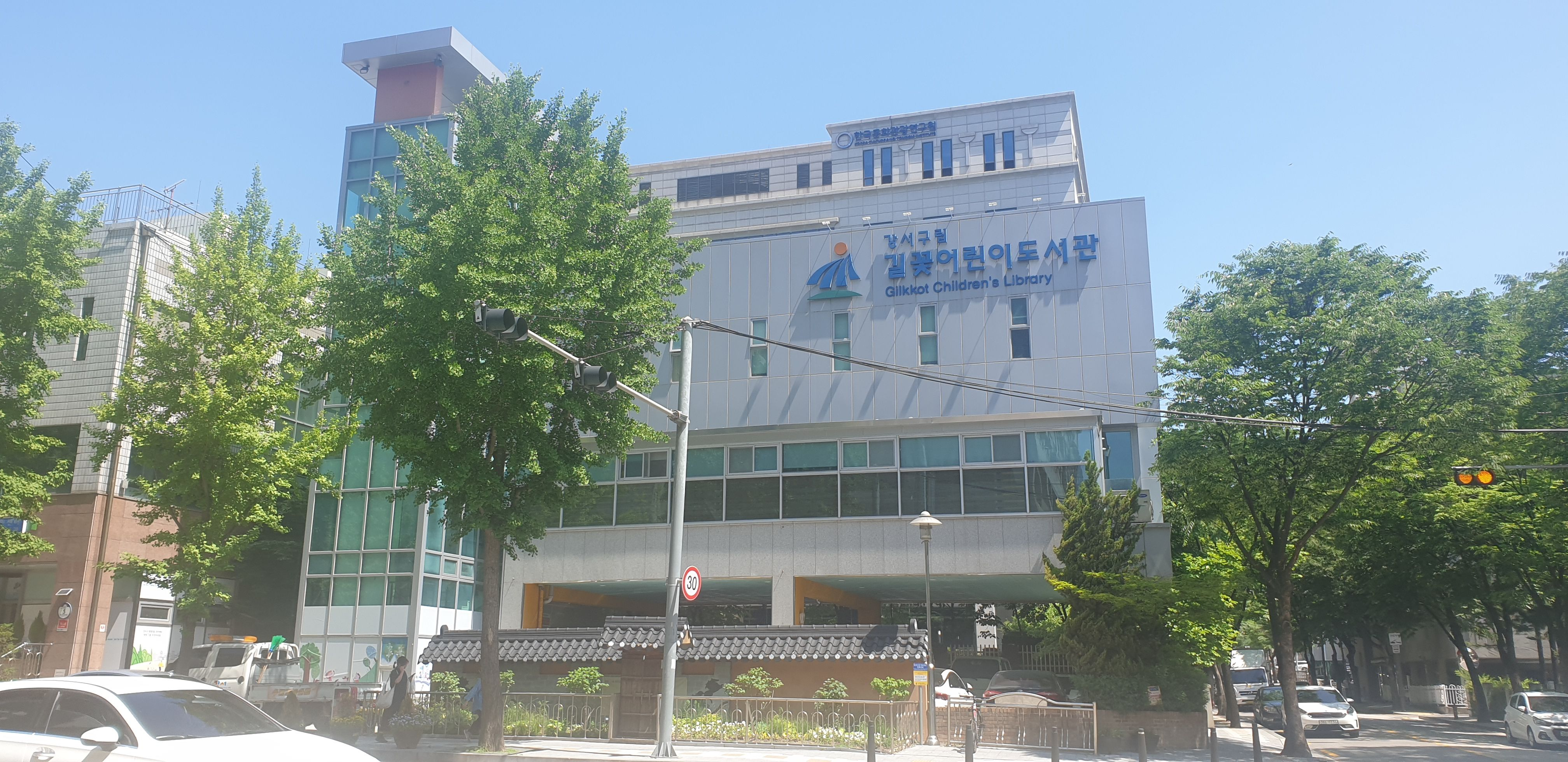
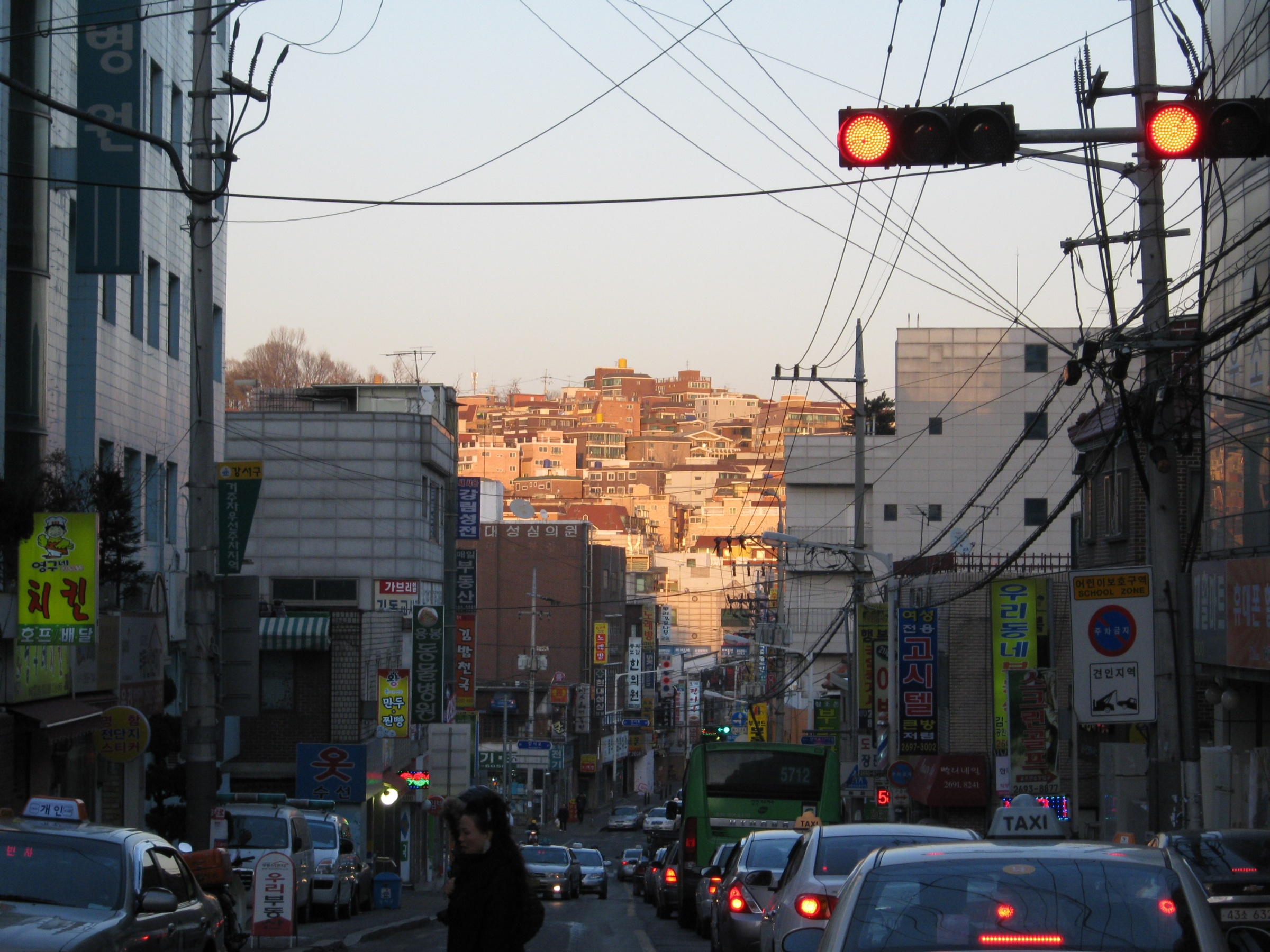
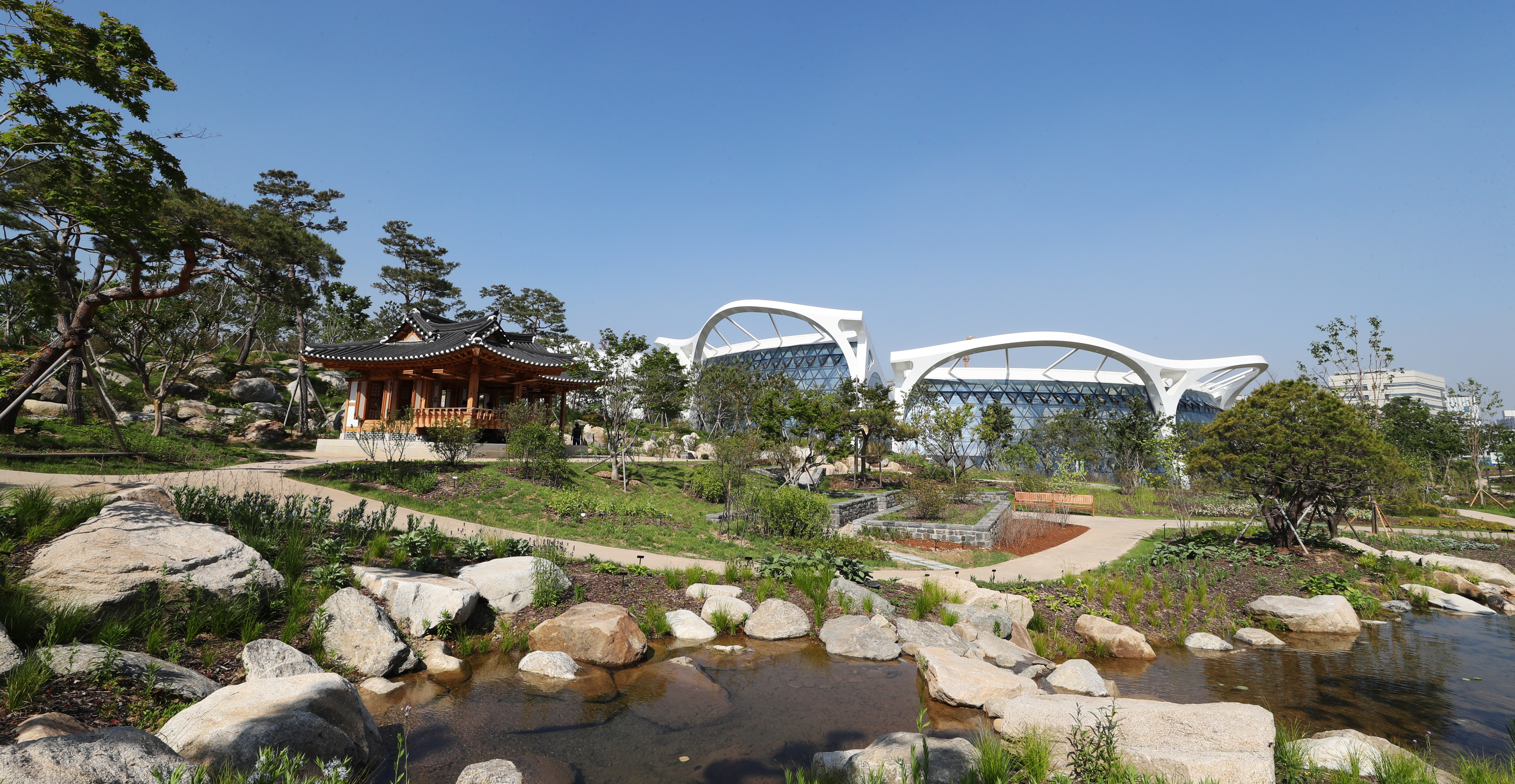
- National Aviation Museum of Korea Gimpo International Airport Magok Square Gilkkot Children’s Library Kkachisan Street Seoul Botanic Park

- Flag

- Location of Gangseo-gu in Seoul
- Interactive map of Gangseo
- Coordinates: 37°32′55″N 126°51′03″E
- Country: South Korea
- Region: Sudogwon
- Special City: Seoul
- Administrative dong: 22

Government
  - Body: Gangseo-gu Council
  - Mayor: Jin Gyo-hoon (Democratic)
  - MNAs: List of MNAs: Kang Sun-woo (Democratic); Jin Seong-jun (Democratic); Han Jeoung-ae (Democratic)

Area
  - Total: 41.4 km^{2} (16.0 sq mi)

Population (2010)
  - Total: 546,938
  - Density: 13,200/km^{2} (34,200/sq mi)
- Time zone: UTC+9 (Korea Standard Time)
- Postal code.: 07500 – 07899
- Area code(s): +82-2-2600~
- Website: Gangseo-gu official website

Korean name
- Hangul: 강서구
- Hanja: 江西區
- RR: Gangseo-gu
- MR: Kangsŏ-gu

Gangseo District (Korean: 강서구; Korean pronunciation: [kaŋ.sʰʌ.ɡu]) is one of the 25 districts (gu) of Seoul, South Korea. It is located on the south side of the Han River. South Korea's third busiest airport, Gimpo International Airport, is located in Gonghang-dong, where many flights fly to cities like Busan, Jeju, and Gwangju. The Magok Industrial Complex, located in Magok-dong, is a major hub for research and development, housing numerous R&D centers and corporate headquarters.

== History ==
=== Origins ===
The earliest recorded name of the area was Jechapa-ui (齊次巴衣), which appears in the Samguk Sagi (History of the Three Kingdoms) under the Goguryeo section. Jecha (齊次) is derived from Jegye (齊戒), meaning ritual or sacrifice, while Pa-ui (巴衣) is an ancient word meaning "rock." Together, the name means "rock for offering rituals." During the Hanseong Baekje period, the Baekje king conducted rituals inside a cave at Heogabawi Rock, praying to the land gods for prosperity. This led to the name Jechapa-ui being used for the area.

=== Three Kingdoms Period ===
During the Three Kingdoms period, the Gangseo region was occupied by both Baekje and Goguryeo. It consisted of five prefectures: Geompo-hyeon (黔浦縣), Jechapa-ui-pyeonghoepa (齊次巴衣平淮把), Dongjahol (童子忽), and Suihol-hyeon (首爾忽縣).

=== Unified Silla Period ===
In 757, during the Unified Silla period, King Gyeongdeok renamed Geompo to Gimpo-hyeon (金浦縣), making it a subordinate prefecture of Jangje-gun (長堤郡).

=== Goryo Dynasty ===
In 1018, under King Hyeonjong of Goryeo, the region became part of Yanggwang-do (楊廣道) and was placed under Sujoo (樹州, present-day Bucheon). In 1391, during King Gongyang’s reign, Gyeonggi Province was divided into left and right regions, with all prefectures except Yangcheon-hyeon (陽川縣) incorporated into Gyeonggi Right Province.

=== Joseon Dynasty ===
In 1414, under King Taejong, Gimpo and Yangcheon were merged into Geumyang-hyeon (衿陽縣). However, in October of that year, the two regions were separated again, with Gimpo incorporated into Bupyeong-bu (富平府). In 1416, Gimpo regained its status as an independent prefecture. In 1632, during King Injo's reign, Gimpo was elevated to county (gun) status.

=== 19th and 20th centuries ===
By 1895, during King Gojong's 32nd year, Korea was reorganized into 23 districts (bu), and Gimpo, Tongjin (通津), and Yangcheon became separate counties. The present-day Gangseo District was historically part of Gimpo County and the northernmost section of present-day Bucheon.

== Geography ==
=== Location ===
This area is part of the Gimpo Plain, located along the banks of the Han River. The underlying bedrock consists of Precambrian granite gneiss and banded gneiss, which have been eroded over a long period, forming hilly terrain. The northern region along the Han River is a floodplain with thick sedimentary deposits, historically utilized as fertile farmland through the construction of embankments.

Several low residual hills remain in the hilly areas, including Gaehwa Mountain (131.2m), Maebong Mountain (117.7m), Ujang Mountain (93.6m), Gung Mountain (74.8m), and Kkachi Mountain (75m). These hills are surrounded by expansive gentle slopes. Additionally, the area is home to streams such as Gayangcheon and Banghwacheon, which flow northward into the Han River. Notably, Banghwacheon features an irrigation channel that takes advantage of the Han River's reverse flow effect.

=== Climate ===
Gangseo District experiences an average annual temperature of 13.3°C, with a January average of 0.4°C and an August average of 26.5°C. The annual precipitation is approximately 1,212.3 mm.

=== River and Streams ===
- Han River
- Gaehwa Stream
- Gulpo Stream

=== Neighbouring cities and districts ===
- Seoul Yangcheon district, Yeongdeungpo district, Mapo district
- Gimpo city
- Incheon city Gyeyang district
- Bucheon city Ojeong district
- Goyang city Deokyang district

== Administrative divisions ==
Administrative divisions

- Balsan-dong (발산동 鉢山洞)
- Banghwa-dong (방화동 傍花洞)
- Gaehwa-dong (개화동 開花洞) --- called "beopjeongdong" administered by Banghwa-dong
- Deungchon-dong (등촌동 登村洞)
- Gayang-dong (가양동 加陽洞)
- Magok-dong (마곡동 麻谷洞) --- called "beopjeongdong" administered by Balsan-dong
- Gonghang-dong (공항동 空港洞)
- Gwahae-dong (과해동 果海洞) --- called "beopjeongdong" administered by Gonghang-dong
- Ogok-dong (오곡동 五谷洞) --- called "beopjeongdong" administered by Gonghang-dong
- Osoe-dong (오쇠동 五釗洞) --- called "beopjeongdong" administered by Gonghang-dong
- Hwagok-dong (화곡동 禾谷洞)
- Yeomchang-dong (염창동 鹽倉洞)

== Economy ==
=== Aviation Industry ===
Owing to the presence of Gimpo International Airport in Gangseo District, several major aviation companies and related services maintain their headquarters or primary offices in the district. Korea Airports Corporation, which manages Gimpo and other airports in South Korea, has its headquarters on the property of Gimpo International Airport in Gonghang-dong. Korean Air's corporate headquarters are also located in Gonghang-dong near Gimpo Airport. Korean Airport Service, Ltd. and Air Total Service are based in the same neighbourhood. Asiana Airlines maintains its headquarters — known as Asiana Town — in Osoe-dong. Jin Air, a low-cost subsidiary of Korean Air, lists its office presence in Deungchon-dong. Eastar Jet, a South Korean low-cost carrier, is headquartered in Banghwa-dong.

=== Retail ===
Traditional markets

- Songjeong Jungang Market
- Deungchon Market
- Banghwa Market

Department stores and shopping complexes

- NC Department Store Gangseo branch
- Lotte Department Store
- Lotte Mall Gimpo Airport
- One Grove Mall
- Homeplus Gangseo
- Lotte Mart Gimpo Airport branch
- E mart Sinwol branch
- Traders Wholesale Club One Grove branch

Major retail and commercial areas

- Magok district commercial zone

== Government and infrastructure ==
The Aviation and Railway Accident Investigation Board (ARAIB) FDR/CVR Analysis and Wreckage Laboratory is on the property of Gimpo International Airport in Gwahae-dong, Gangseo District. Previously the ARAIB had its headquarters in Gonghang-dong, Gangseo District. The ARAIB headquarters are now in Sejong City.

== Attractions ==
- Heojun Museum
- SBS Open Hall
- Gyeomjae Jeong Seon Art Museum
- LG Arts Center
- Coex Magok Lewest
- One Grove

== Transportation ==
=== Railway ===
- Airport Railroad Co., Ltd.

- AREX

(Gyeyang District, Incheon) ← Gimpo Airport → (Goyang), (Eunpyeong District)

- Seoul Metro

- Seoul Subway Line 2 Sinjeong Branch

(Yangcheon District) ← Kkachisan

- Seoul Metropolitan Rapid Transit Corporation

- Seoul Subway Line 5

Banghwa — Gaehwasan — Gimpo Airport — Magok — Balsan — Ujangsan — Hwagok — Kkachisan → (Yangcheon District)

- Seoul Metro Line 9 Corporation

- Seoul Subway Line 9

Gaehwa — Gimpo Airport — Airport Market — Sinbanghwa — Magongnaru — Yangcheon Hyanggyo — Gayang — Jeungmi — Deungchon — Yeomchang → (Yangcheon District)

== Notable people ==
- Lee Guk-jong (born 1969), South Korean doctor
- Kim Gun-mo (born 1968), South Korean singer-songwriter (Originally from Busan, but raised in Gangseo-gu)
- Gong Hyo-jin (born 1980), South Korean actress (born in Sinwol-dong)
- Solar (Real Name: Kim Yong-sun, 김용선, born 1991), singer-songwriter, dancer, lyricist, YouTuber, digital influencer and K-pop idol, leader and member of K-pop girlgroup Mamamoo
- Lee "Faker" Sang-hyeok (born 1996), League of Legends player, six time League of Legends World Championship winner with SK Telecom T1
- Hayoung (Real Name: Oh Ha-young, 오하영, born 1996), singer, dancer, actress and K-pop idol, member of K-pop girlgroup Apink

== Education ==
=== University ===
Gangseo District is home to several higher education institutions, including Korea Polytechnic University’s Gangseo Campus, Seoul Digital University’s Gangseo Campus, Gangseo University, and a campus of Ewha Womans University College of Medicine.

== Sister cities ==
Country	City&Region	
South Korea	Gangneung City	Gangwon-do
South Korea	Pyeongchang-gun	Gangwon-do
South Korea	Imsil-gun	Jeollabuk-do
South Korea	Goesan-gun	Chungcheongbuk-do
South Korea	Taean-gun	Chungcheongnam-do
South Korea	Sangju City	Gyeongsangbuk-do
South Korea	Haman-gun	Gyeongsangnam-do
South Korea	Jeongeup City	Jeollabuk-do
South Korea	Wanju-gun	Jeollabuk-do
South Korea	Yeosu City	Jeollanam-do
South Korea	Suncheon City	Jeollanam-do
Australia	Penrith City	New South Wales
China	Zhaoyuan City	Shandong Province
China	Changning District	Shanghai
Japan	Otaru City	Hokkaido
Philippines	Tarlac City	Tarlac Province
United Kingdom	Nottingham City	England
