= Korean Air Lines Flight 015 =

1980 aviation accident in South Korea

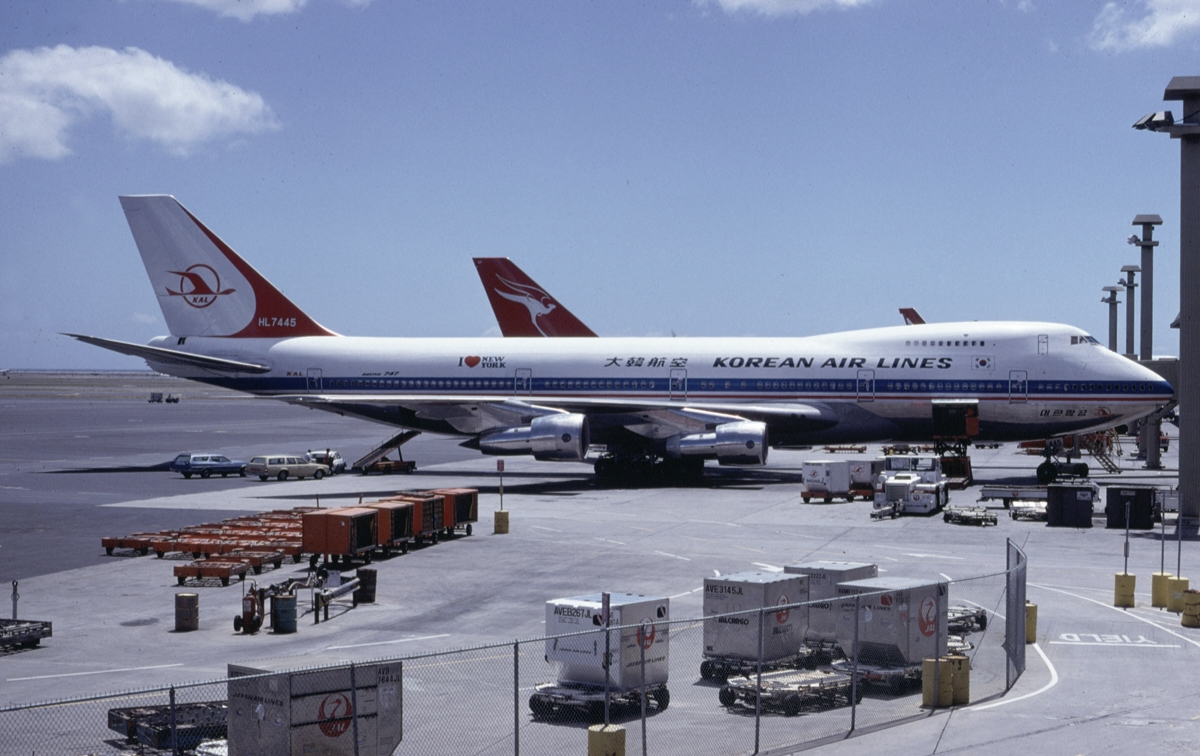
- HL7445, the aircraft involved in the accident, pictured in 1979

Accident
- Date: November 19, 1980
- Summary: Controlled flight into terrain due to pilot error and poor visibility
- Site: Gimpo International Airport, Seoul, South Korea

Aircraft
- Aircraft type: Boeing 747-2B5B
- Operator: Korean Air Lines
- Call sign: KOREAN AIR 015
- Registration: HL7445
- Flight origin: Los Angeles International Airport, California, United States
- Stopover: Anchorage International Airport, Alaska, United States
- Destination: Gimpo International Airport, Gimpo, South Korea
- Occupants: 226
- Passengers: 212
- Crew: 14
- Fatalities: 15
- Injuries: 15
- Survivors: 211

Korean Air Lines Flight 015 was a Boeing 747-200 operating a scheduled passenger flight from Los Angeles International Airport, in Los Angeles, California, to Gimpo International Airport in Seoul, South Korea with an intermediate stop in Anchorage, Alaska, that crashed while attempting to land on 19 November 1980. Of the 226 passengers and crew on board, 15 were killed in the accident. The aircraft was damaged beyond repair.

== Background ==
=== Aircraft ===
The aircraft involved was a Boeing 747-2B5B that was less than a year old. It was registered as HL7445 with four Pratt & Whitney JT9D-7Q. The MSN of the aircraft was 21773/366.

== Accident ==
The wind was calm with a visibility of 1,000 m in fog as the Korean Air Lines 747 made its approach to Runway 14 at Gimpo International Airport. The pilot reported trouble with the controls shortly before the aircraft touched down 90 metres short of the threshold and contacted an embankment slope. The aircraft's cargo compartment was ruptured after the main landing gear were pushed into it. Flight 015 slid down the runway on its belly and a fire broke out. The aircraft was evacuated but six crew and nine passengers were killed in the accident and four passengers had serious injuries.
