= Gangseo District =

Gangseo-gu (Korean: 강서구; Hanja: 江西區), or "west of river district," is the name of a gu in 2 South Korean cities:

- Gangseo District, Busan
- Gangseo District, Seoul

== See also ==
- Kangso-guyok, district of Nampo, North Korea
