= Gimpo International Airport =

Secondary airport serving Seoul, South Korea

Gimpo International Airport 김포국제공항
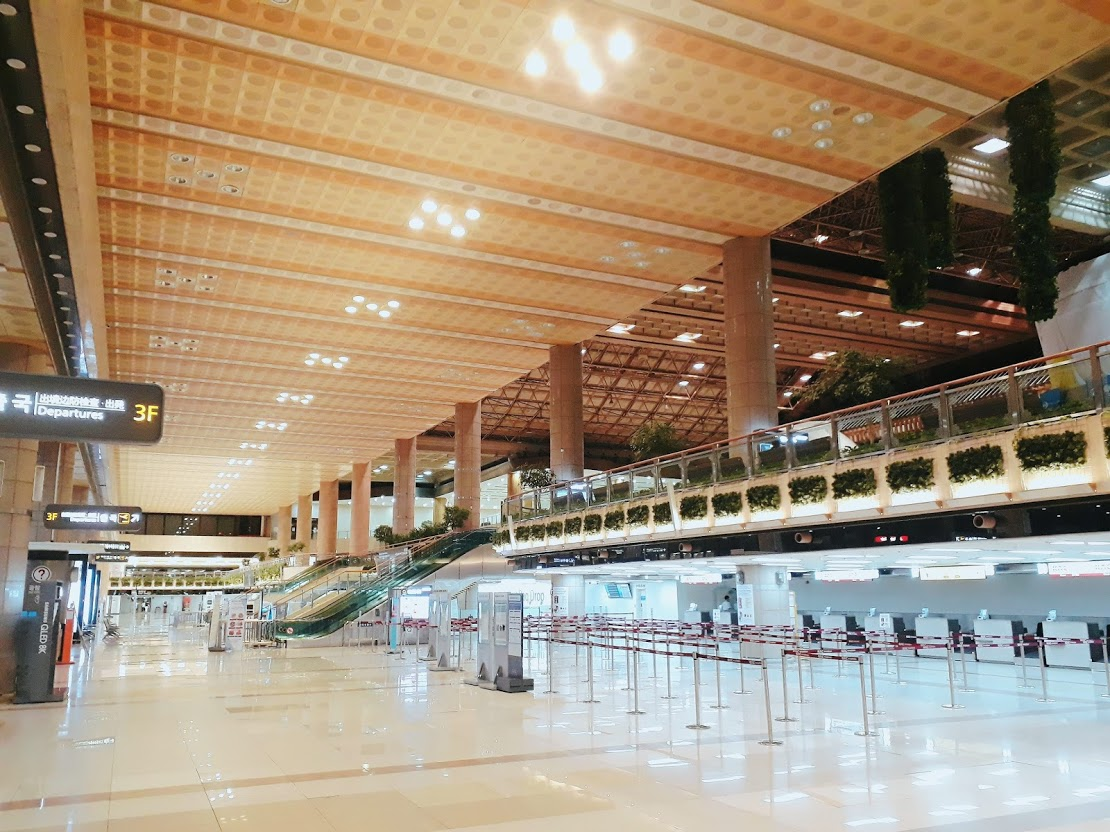
- Terminal interior in 2019
- IATA: GMP; ICAO: RKSS; WMO: 47110

Summary
- Airport type: Public
- Owner: Ministry of Land, Infrastructure and Transport
- Operator: Korea Airports Corporation
- Serves: Seoul metropolitan area
- Location: Gonghang-dong, Gangseo-gu, Seoul, South Korea
- Opened: 30 January 1958; 68 years ago
- Hub for: Asiana Airlines; Korean Air
- Focus city for: Trinity Airways
- Operating base for: Eastar Jet; Jeju Air; Jin Air
- Built: 1939; 87 years ago
- Elevation AMSL: 18 m (59 ft)
- Coordinates: 37°33′29″N 126°47′26″E
- Website: www.airport.co.kr/gimpoeng/index.do

Map
- Location of airport in Seoul Location of airport in South Korea

Runways
Direction	Length		Surface
Direction	m	ft	Surface
14R/32L	3,200	10,499	Asphalt
14L/32R	3,600	11,811	Asphalt

Statistics (2019)
- Total passengers: 25,448,416
- Aircraft movements: 140,422
- Tonnes of cargo: 253,395
- Statistics from KAC

Korean name
- Hangul: 김포국제공항
- Hanja: 金浦國際空港
- RR: Gimpo gukjegonghang
- MR: Kimp'o kukchegonghang

Gimpo International Airport (IATA: GMP, ICAO: RKSS), formerly rendered in English as Kimpo International Airport, is located some 15 kilometres (9 mi) west of the central district of Seoul, the capital of South Korea.

Gimpo previously carried the IATA airport code SEL, which is now used by airline reservation systems and travel agencies within the Seoul metropolitan area, and was the main international airport for Seoul and South Korea before being replaced by Incheon International Airport in 2001. It now functions as Seoul's secondary airport. In 2015, over 23 million passengers used the airport, making it the third-busiest airport in Korea since being surpassed by Jeju International Airport.

On 29 November 2003, scheduled services between Gimpo and Haneda Airport in Tokyo resumed with services also operating at Incheon Airport. Services to Shanghai Hongqiao International Airport resumed on 28 October 2007. Services to Kansai International Airport in Osaka, Japan, started on 26 October 2008 with services also operating at Incheon Airport. Services to Beijing Capital International Airport started on 1 July 2011 with services also operating at Incheon Airport. Services to Taipei Songshan Airport started on 30 April 2012.

== History ==
The airfield was built in 1939 during the Japanese Imperial period as an Imperial Army base. The runways were built on a bed of rocks manually hauled by Korean labourers from Kaihwasan and Yangchan, several miles from the base. Then known as Keijo New Airfield (京城新飛行場), Gimpo was constructed with four runways to supplement the much smaller Keijo Airfield (京城飛行場), which was later known as Yeouido Airport.

=== Korean War ===
Gimpo played a major role during the Korean War, and the USAF designated the airfield as Kimpo Air Base or K-14.

North Korean forces attacked South Korea on 25 June 1950 starting the Korean War. During one of the first Korean People's Air Force (KPAF) attacks on 25 June, a Military Air Transport Service C-54 Skymaster was destroyed on the ground at Gimpo. On 27 June, US naval and air forces began evacuating 748 US diplomats, military dependents, and civilians by air transport from Kimpo and Suwon Airfield. On the afternoon of 27 June, five F-82 Twin Mustangs of the 68th Fighter Squadron and 339th Fighter Squadron were escorting four C-54 Skymaster aircraft out of Kimpo when the C-54s were attacked by five KPAF Lavochkin La-7 fighters. In the subsequent dogfights, three LA-7s were shot down for the loss of no US aircraft in the first air battle of the war. Later that day, four F-80Cs of the 35th Fighter-Bomber Squadron shot down four Ilyushin Il-10s for no losses over Gimpo in the USAF's first jet-aircraft victory.

Gimpo was captured by the KPA shortly after the capture of Seoul on 28 June 1950. On 29 June, eight B-29s of the 19th Bomb Group bombed Gimpo and the Seoul railyards. By July, the KPAF were using the base for attacks on UN forces; on 10 July, seven Yak-7s were hidden at Gimpo and used in strikes against UN positions at Cheongju. The next day, they surprised and damaged several F-80s in the area. On 15 July, the US launched an attack on Gimpo, destroying two or three of the seven Yak-7s there and damaging the runway. On 5 August 5th Air Force fighters strafed and bombed Gimpo, destroying 9 aircraft and damaging 9 others.

Following the Inchon landings on 15 September 1950, the 2nd Battalion 5th Marines was ordered to seize Gimpo on 17 September. Gimpo was defended by a conglomeration of half-trained fighting men and service forces, and by the morning of 18 September, the Marines had secured the airfield. The airfield was in excellent shape as the North Koreans had not had time to do any major demolition. On 19 September, the U.S. Army Corps of Engineers repaired the local railroad up to 13 kilometres (8 mi) inland and 32 C-54 transport planes began flying in gasoline and ordnance. VMF-212 was one of the first units to operate from Gimpo before moving forward to Yonpo Airfield. On 25 September, the 811th Engineer Aviation Battalion began repairing bomb damage on the 1,800-metre (6,000 ft) asphalt runway at Gimpo and covering it with Marston Matting. On 6 October, the USAF took control of Gimpo from the USMC.

On 20 December 1950 Gimpo was the scene of the "Kiddy Car Airlift", the rescue of 964 orphans and 80 orphanage staff from Seoul in the face of the advancing Chinese People's Volunteer Army (PVA).

On 31 December 1950 the PVA attacked the UN forces north of Seoul. On 2 January 1951 the 4th Fighter-Interceptor Wing withdrew from Gimpo to bases in Japan. On 3 January UN forces withdrew from Seoul and on 4 January USAF engineers destroyed stocks of fuel and munitions and some of the buildings at Gimpo, before abandoning the base.

UN forces resumed the offensive again in late January 1951 and launched Operation Thunderbolt on 25 January, with the aim of pushing Chinese and North Korean forces back north of the Han River. By 10 February 1951, UN forces once again had control of Gimpo.

USAF units based at Gimpo included:

- 51st Fighter-Interceptor Wing from 6 October-December 1950
- 4th Fighter-Interceptor Wing (initially the 336th Fighter-Interceptor Squadron equipped with F-86A Sabres) December 1950 and August 1951 onwards
- 8th Fighter-bomber Wing from June-August 1951
- 67th Tactical Reconnaissance Wing from August 1951
- 606th Aircraft Control and Warning Squadron from July 1951

On 21 September 1953 KPAF Lieutenant No Kum-Sok defected, landing his MiG-15 at Gimpo.

=== International era ===
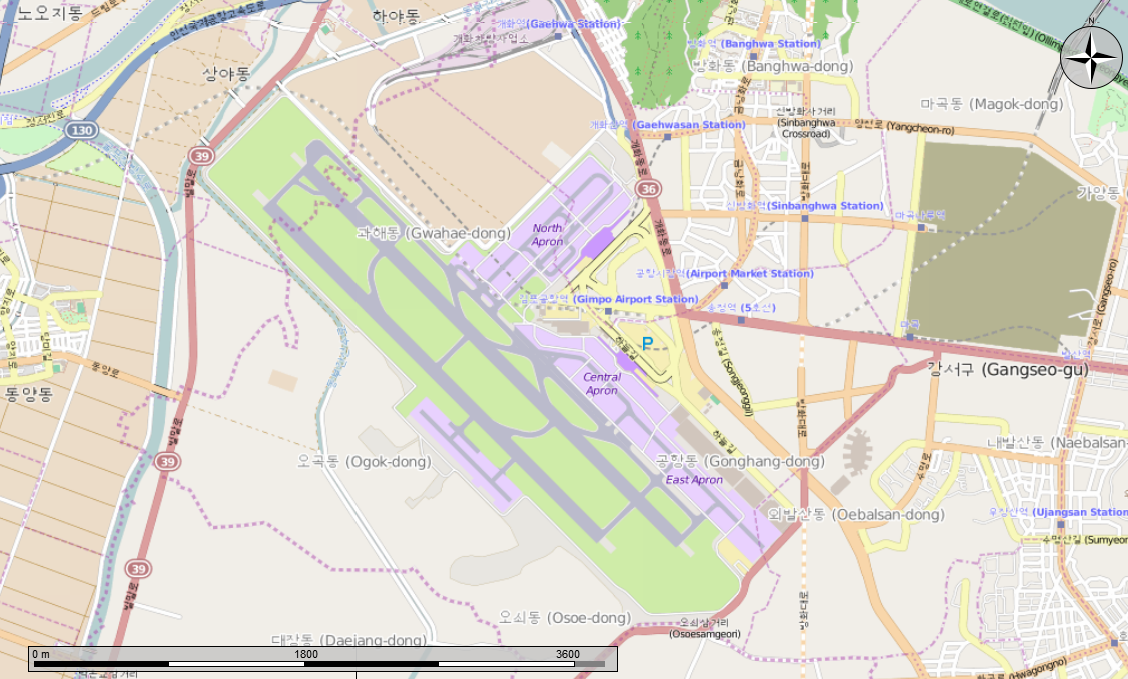
Map, c. 2014

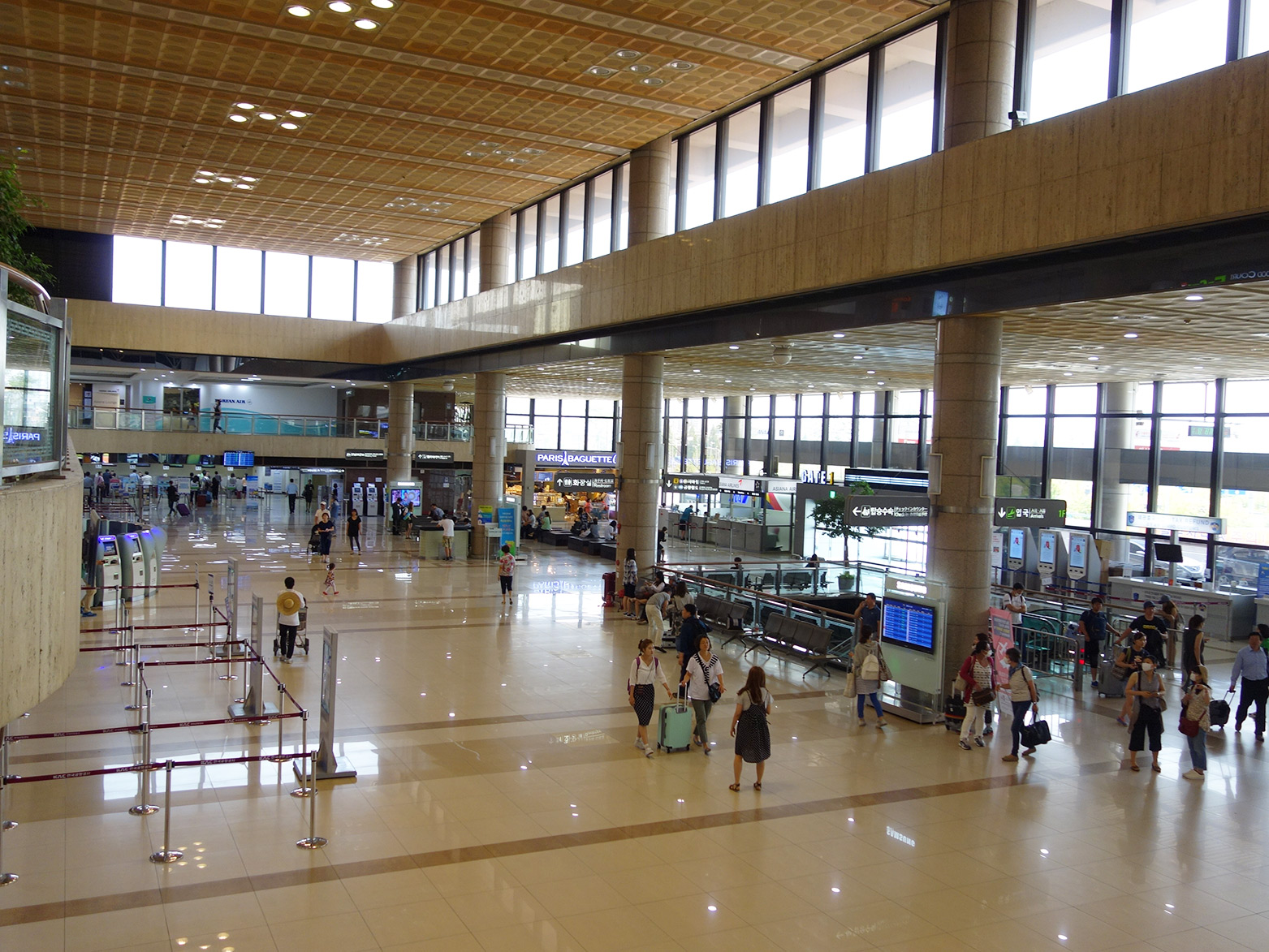
International terminal

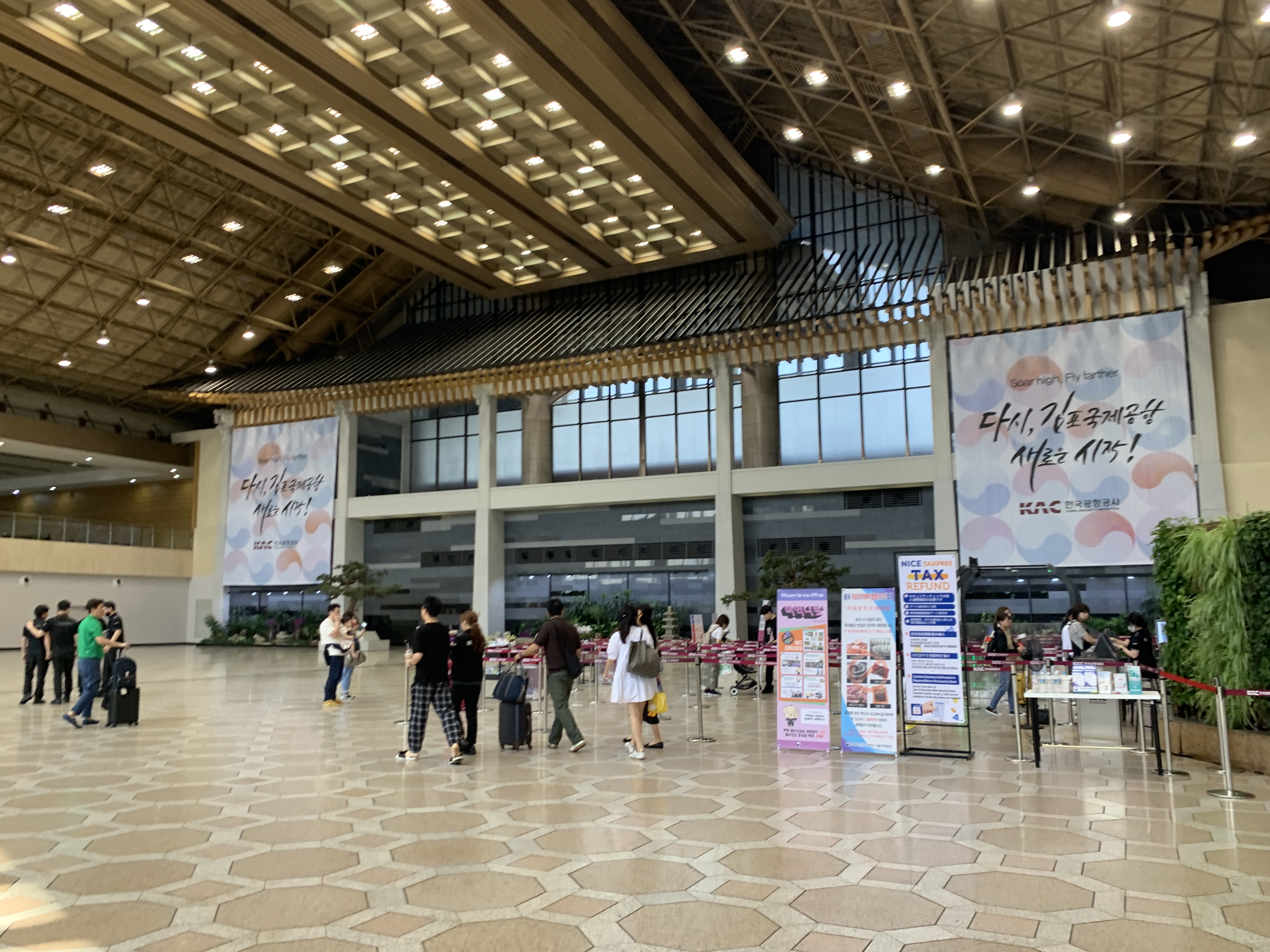
Terminal interior

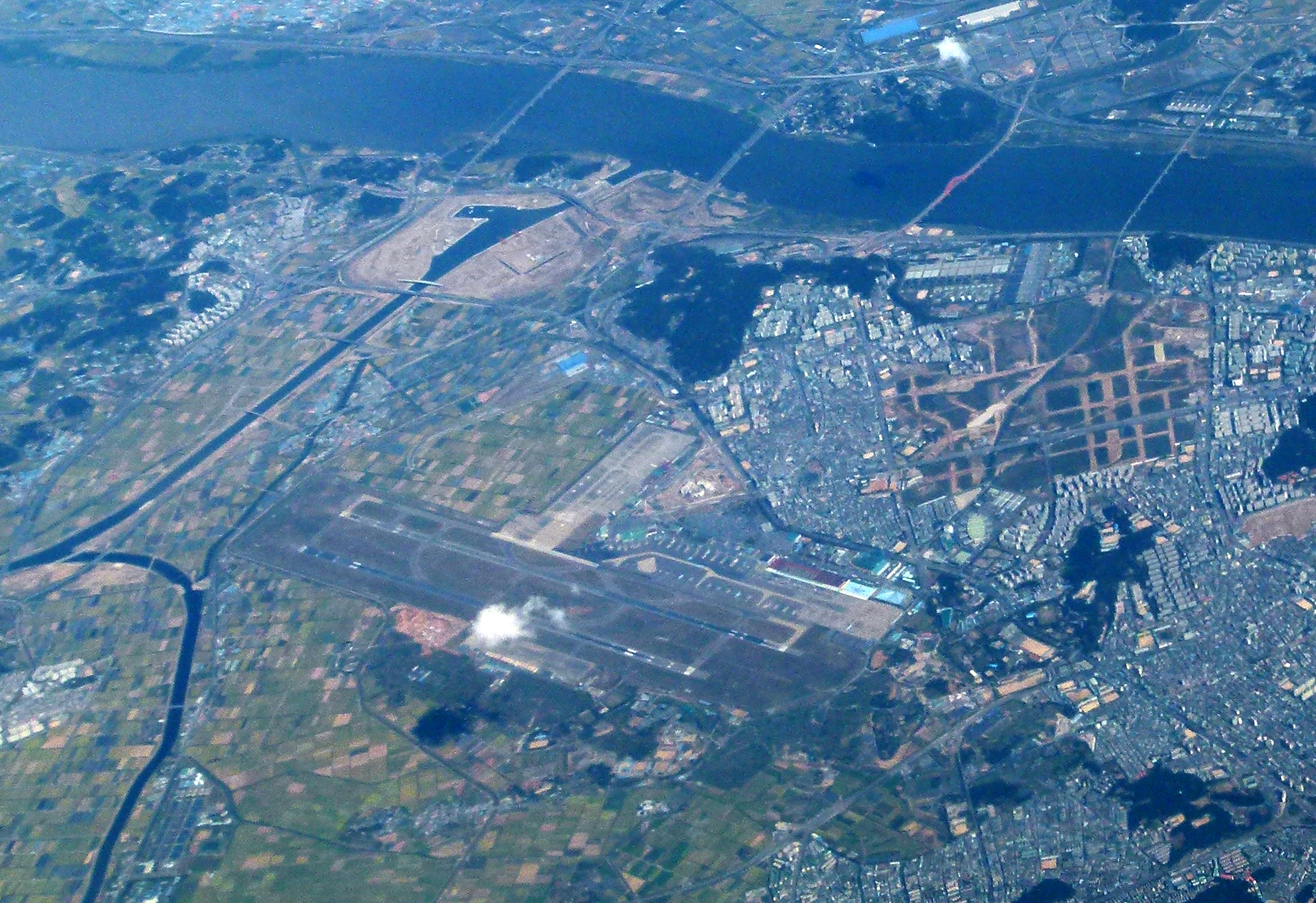
Aerial view of Gimpo Airport in 2011, with the Han River visible near the top

In 1958, the airport was redesignated as the Gimpo international airport of Seoul by a presidential decree, completely replacing the existing Yeouido Airport.

Eventually, the South Korean government decided to build a new airport. The facility was initially planned to be in Cheongju, 124 kilometres (77 mi) away from Seoul, but that idea was strongly opposed by the citizens of Seoul and Gyeonggi Province, due to the inconvenience it would pose to them. (It would have been farther from Seoul than the 80 kilometres (50 mi) distance between Viracopos Airport in Campinas, Brazil, and the city of São Paulo.) Finally, Yeongjong Island, a part of the city of Incheon, slightly west of Seoul, was chosen for the new airport, which later came to be known as Incheon International Airport. All bigger scale international flights were moved to Incheon when it opened in 2001.

=== Post-Incheon-activation era ===
"Shuttle" flights to Haneda Airport in Tokyo started in November 2003 on a charter basis, cutting 30 minutes or more of ground transportation at each end in an attempt to attract business travelers. This "city to city" route was followed by new routes to Hongqiao Airport in Shanghai starting in October 2007, Kansai Airport in Osaka starting in 2008, Beijing starting in July 2011, and Songshan Airport in Taipei starting in April 2012. Total international passenger numbers at Gimpo rose from under one million in 2005 to over four million by 2012.

The Haneda-Gimpo route was suspended in 2020 due to the COVID-19 pandemic, but resumed in June 2022 with eight weekly round trips, and recovered to 84 weekly round trips by the end of 2022 as entry restrictions were lifted. On 26 March 2023, the Haneda-Incheon services resumed with two daily round trips a week with Korean Air and Peach with Asiana Airlines resuming the route on 1 May 2023 with seven daily round trips a week.

Korea Airports announced an expansion and remodeling of the terminals in 2013, adding new gates and security checkpoints. In 2017, the South Korean government announced that a new terminal would be built to meet growing domestic traffic.

== Airlines and destinations ==
Airlines	Destinations
Air Seoul	Jeju
All Nippon Airways	Tokyo–Haneda
Asiana Airlines	Beijing–Capital, Gwangju, Jeju, Osaka–Kansai, Shanghai–Hongqiao, Tokyo–Haneda, Yeosu (all end 17 December 2026)
China Airlines	Taipei–Songshan
Eastar Jet	Jeju, Taipei–Songshan
EVA Air	Taipei–Songshan
Japan Airlines	Tokyo–Haneda
Jeju Air	Jeju, Kaohsiung
Jin Air	Busan, Pohang–Gyeongju, Sacheon, Yeosu
Korean Air	Beijing–Capital, Busan, Jeju, Osaka–Kansai, Shanghai–Hongqiao, Tokyo–Haneda, Ulsan
Parata Air	Jeju
Peach Aviation	Nagoya–Centrair, Osaka–Kansai
Shanghai Airlines	Shanghai–Hongqiao
SUM Air	Sacheon
Tigerair Taiwan	Kaohsiung
Trinity Airways	Kaohsiung, Taipei–Songshan

== Statistics ==
=== Traffic by calendar year ===
Traffic by calendar year
	Passenger volume	Aircraft operations	Cargo tonnage
2001	22,041,099	154,164	708,073
2002	17,092,095	128,428	302,240
2003	16,880,641	126,343	290,731
2004	7,674,153	52,212	175,850
2005	13,448,152	94,787	272,304
2006	13,766,523	94,943	274,368
2007	13,811,004	100,124	248,736
2008	14,264,693	108,015	203,977
2009	15,369,944	115,895	230,115
2010	17,565,901	118,514	226,493
2011	18,513,927	126,115	260,135
2012	19,429,224	130,269	254,563
2013	19,904,327	134,623	246,227
2014	21,566,946	138,706	271,990
2015	23,163,778	142,863	271,066
2016	25,043,299	146,266	274,712
2017	25,101,147	145,507	266,428
2018	24,602,588	141,080	267,266
2019	25,448,416	140,422	253,395
2020	17,446,239	113,580	142,380
2021	22,525,417	138,855	142,439
2022	24,524,065	143,713	163,918
2023	23,424,158	134,560	185,570
Source: Korea Airports Corporation Traffic Statistics

== Other facilities ==
Korea Airports Corporation (KAC) has its headquarters on the airport property.

The Aviation and Railway Accident Investigation Board (ARAIB) has its FDR/CVR Analysis and Wreckage Laboratory on the property of the airport. When the predecessor agency Korea Aviation Accident Investigation Board (KAIB) existed, its CVR/FDR and wreckage laboratory was located on the airport property.

== Ground transportation ==
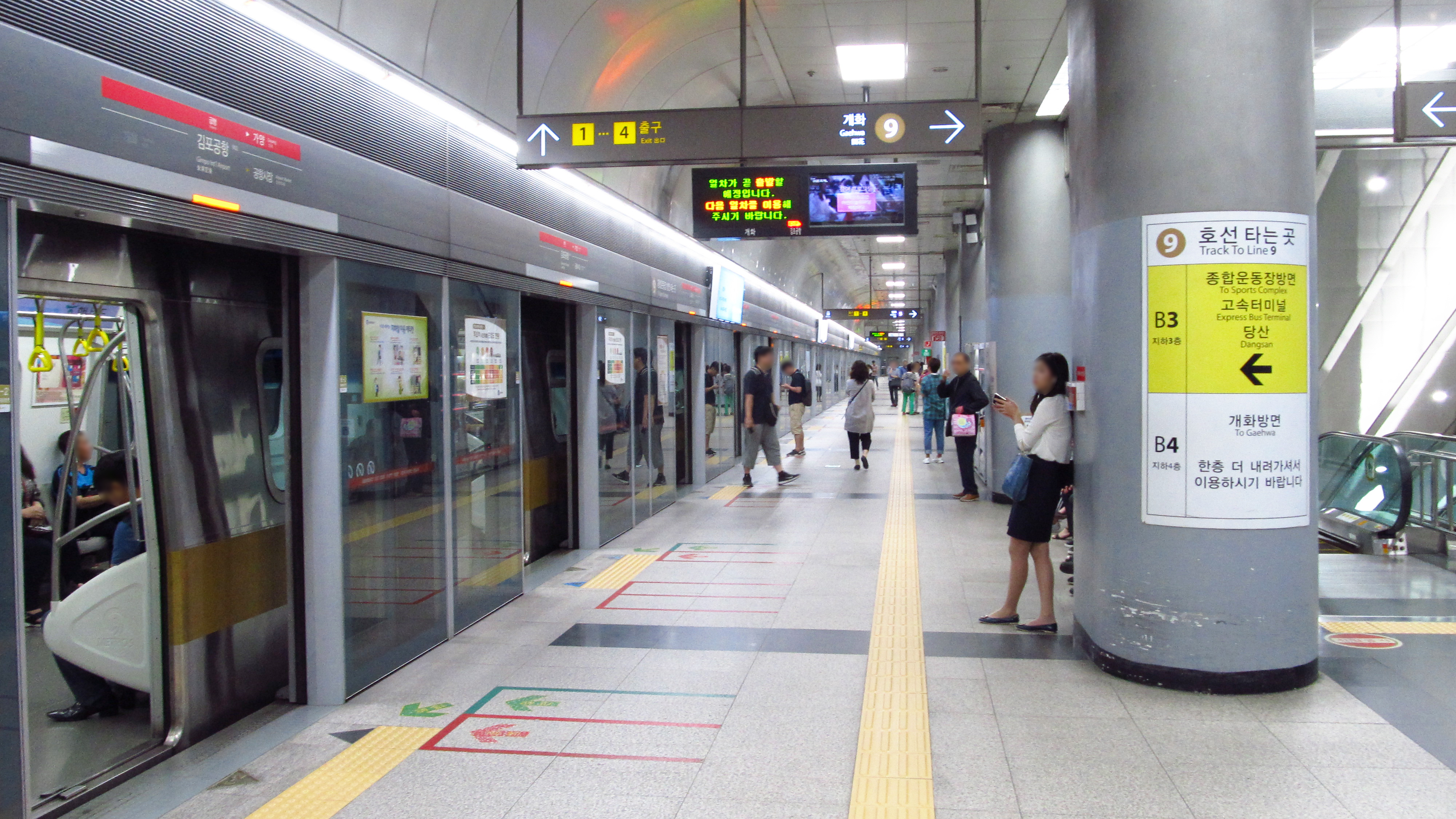
The platform at Gimpo International Airport station

== Accidents and incidents ==
- On 22 February 1957, a USAF Douglas C-124 Globemaster II crashed near SEL after takeoff because of a prop/turbine blade separation, resulting in a forced landing in the Han River. Out of a total of 159 passengers and crew on board, 21 were killed.
- On 19 November 1980, Korean Air Lines Flight 015, a Boeing 747-200 landed short of the runway, ripping off all main landing gear, causing the aircraft to skid to a stop on the nose wheel and outer two engines starting a fire. 15 of the 226 total occupants were killed, including the first officer and captain.
- On 25 November 1989, Korean Air Flight 175, a Fokker F28-4000 en route to Ulsan Airport crashed right after takeoff. No one was killed, but 40 people were wounded.
- On 5 August 1998, Korean Air Flight 8702, a Boeing 747-400, rolled off the runway upon touchdown and slid into a ditch, resulting in the destruction of the aircraft's undercarriage and the fuselage being split. All 395 of the total occupants survived and the aircraft was written off.

== See also ==
- List of the busiest airports in South Korea
- Transport in South Korea
