= Gonghang-dong =

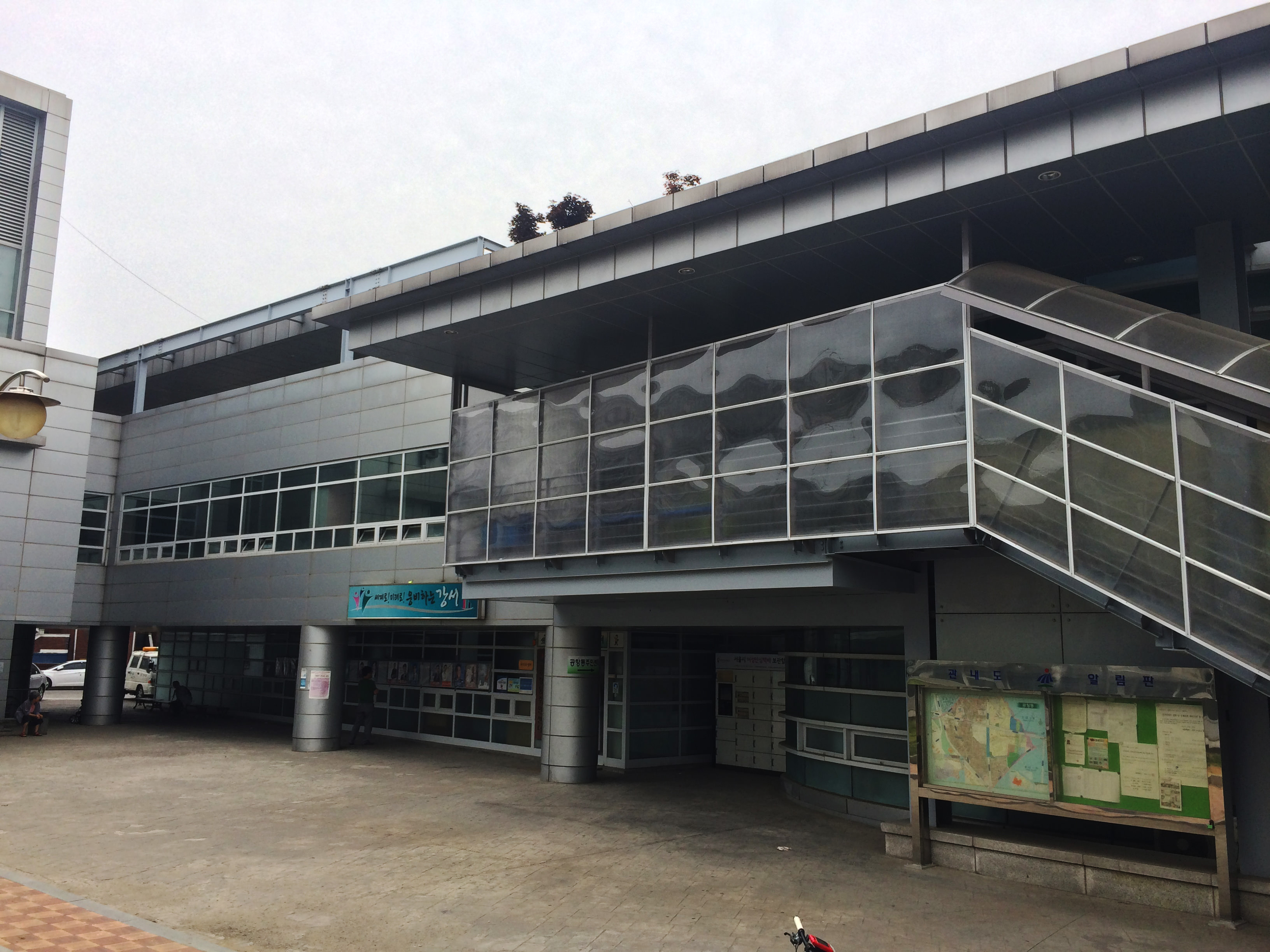
- Gonghang-dong Community Service Center

- Location within Seoul Location within South Korea
- Country: South Korea

Area
  - Total: 10.84 km^{2} (4.19 sq mi)

Population (2001)
  - Total: 23,292
  - Density: 2,149/km^{2} (5,570/sq mi)

Korean name
- Hangul: 공항동
- Hanja: 空港洞
- RR: Gonghang-dong
- MR: Konghang-dong

Gonghang-dong (Korean: 공항동) is a dong (neighborhood) of Gangseo District, Seoul, South Korea. The name gonghang literally means "airport", which is due to Gimpo International Airport located in the area.

Korean Air's headquarters, Korean Airport Service, Ltd., and Air Total Service are located in Gonghang-dong.

In addition, the former headquarters of the Aviation and Railway Accident Investigation Board is in Gonghang-dong. The facility once housed the headquarters of the predecessor agency Korea Aviation Accident Investigation Board. The headquarters of the ARAIB agency are now in Sejong City.

== History ==
The region was originally called Songjeongri(松亭里) during the Joseon dynasty because of its thick pine trees. In 1914, the region merged with neighboring Nuleori(訥語里) and Soyulri(小栗里) to form Songjeongri under Kimpo. From 1963, the place was renamed as gonghangdong to reflect that it has an airport(gonghang means airport in korean).

== See also ==
- Administrative divisions of South Korea
