= Birds Korea =

South Korean conservation organisation

- Hangul: 새와 생명의 터
- Hanja: 새와 生命의 터
- Lit.: Site of Birds and Life
- RR: Saewa saengmyeongui teo
- MR: Saewa saengmyŏngŭi t'ŏ

Birds Korea is an organisation dedicated to the conservation of birds and their habitats in South Korea and the wider Yellow Sea Eco-region.

== History and Activities ==
Founded in 2004 and based in the port city of Busan, Birds Korea has regularly updated websites in both English and Korean. Birds Korea works on a wide range of conservation projects, including research, advocacy, and education programs. As such, the organisation has received wide domestic and international coverage of their work in both online and mainstream media, on issues ranging from Korean outbreaks of H5N1 avian influenza (2005–2006), to the impacts of the Taean oil spill (2007), to pilot restoration work at the Mokpo Namhang urban wetland (2007–2008), and to concerns over avian biodiversity threatened by the proposed Korean Grand Canal Project (2008).

Most notably, in 2006 Birds Korea developed the Saemangeum Shorebird Monitoring Program (SSMP) in partnership with the Australasian Wader Studies Group, monitoring the impacts of the world's largest known coastal reclamation (the 40,100 ha Saemangeum) on populations of migratory shorebirds. Prior to seawall closure in April 2006, Saemangeum was considered to be the single most important shorebird site in the Yellow Sea (Barter, 2002). The SSMP documented (following seawall closure) very major declines of several species of shorebirds within the Saemangeum reclamation area and adjacent wetlands (Moores et al., 2006; Rogers et al., 2006; Moores et al., 2007), and through further coordinated survey effort (e.g. the 2008 Birds Korea National Shorebird Survey), declines of species such as spoon-billed sandpiper Eurynorhynchus pygmeus (critically endangered) and great knot Calidris tenuirostris at the national level too. SSMP and other shorebird data gathered in 2008 is to be published in time for the Tenth Conference of the Parties of the Ramsar Convention (to be held in Changwon City, South Korea, between October 28 and November 4, 2008), to inform and influence the increasingly urgent debate on the need to better conserve the intertidal habitats and biodiversity of the Yellow Sea.

== See also ==
- Songdo International Business District
