= Garyeokdo =

Former islands in Gunsan, South Korea

Garyeokdo (Korean: 가력도; Hanja: 可力島) refers to two former islands in Okdo-myeon, Gunsan, Jeollabuk-do, South Korea. Garyeokdo was divided into two parts: North Garyeokdo (Bian-ri 495) and South Garyeokdo (Bian-ri 496). North Garyeokdo is now submerged under the water after the construction of the Garyeok Sluice Gate, leaving only South Garyeokdo as part of the land.

== Current status ==
Both South and North Garyeokdo became connected to the Saemangeum Seawall during its construction, making them part of the seawall. The former South Garyeokdo is located at the northwestern end of the 1st section of the seawall and is entirely included in the Garyeokdo Ecological Park. The former North Garyeokdo now mostly lies underwater with the Garyeok Sluice Gate installed on it, making it a "porakji" (land submerged underwater and no longer usable as land). (Note: Porak (浦落) refers to land that has become submerged underwater and is no longer considered recoverable as land in social norms.)

On October 26, 2015, the Central Dispute Mediation Committee of the Ministry of the Interior and Safety decided that the 1st section of the seawall, including the Garyeok Sluice Gate, would fall under the jurisdiction of Buan County, while the 2nd section of the seawall would fall under Gimje, making Bian-ri 495 and 496, which belong to Gunsan, exclaves.

== Garyeokdo Port ==
Garyeokdo Port (可力島港) is a fishing port created beside South Garyeokdo and used as a docking point for fishermen from Buan County. Following the decision of the Central Dispute Mediation Committee in October 2015, the port came under the jurisdiction of Buan County. Additionally, it is the closest harbor to Bian-do and Durido at the southern end of Gunsan. (Note: Before 1896, Bian-do and Durido, located at the southern end of the Gogunsangundo, were part of Buan County.)

However, for over 10 years, commercial ferry operations between Garyeokdo and Bian-do, Durido, and other islands were banned. This ban originated in 2007, when Jeollabuk-do prematurely announced plans to transfer the port's jurisdiction to Gunsan, sparking an administrative dispute between Gunsan and Buan over the administrative districts of the Saemangeum reclamation project. As a result, residents of Bian-do and Durido had to rely on private boats to travel to Garyeokdo Port, even for family visits.

In December 2018, the Anti-Corruption and Civil Rights Commission mediated an agreement between Gunsan and Buan to allow ferry service between Garyeokdo Port and Bian-do, and a ferry service started operations in December 2019.
