= Seonyudo =

Seonyudo may refer to:

- Seonyudo, Seoul
- Seonyudo, Gunsan
