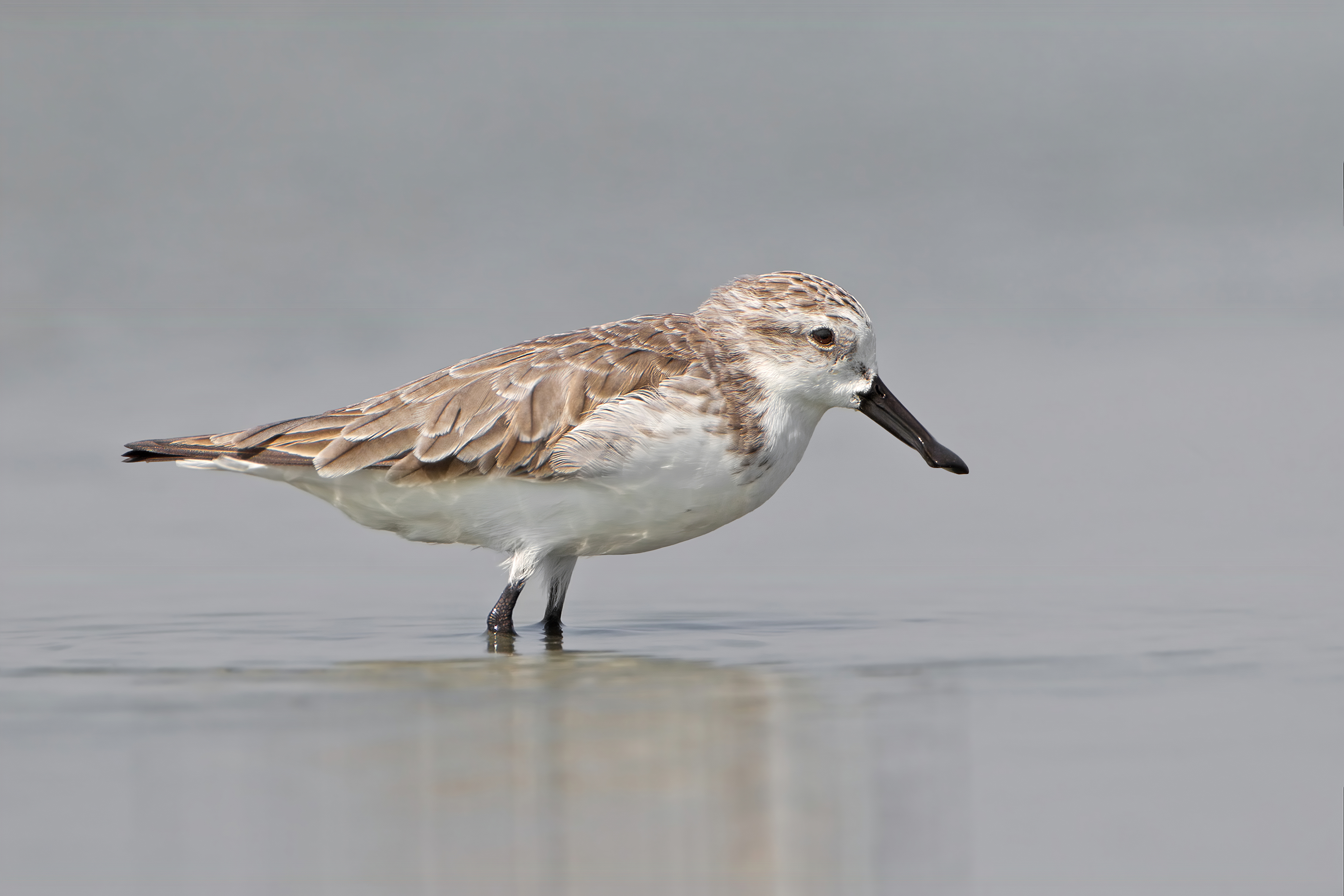
- Non-breeding
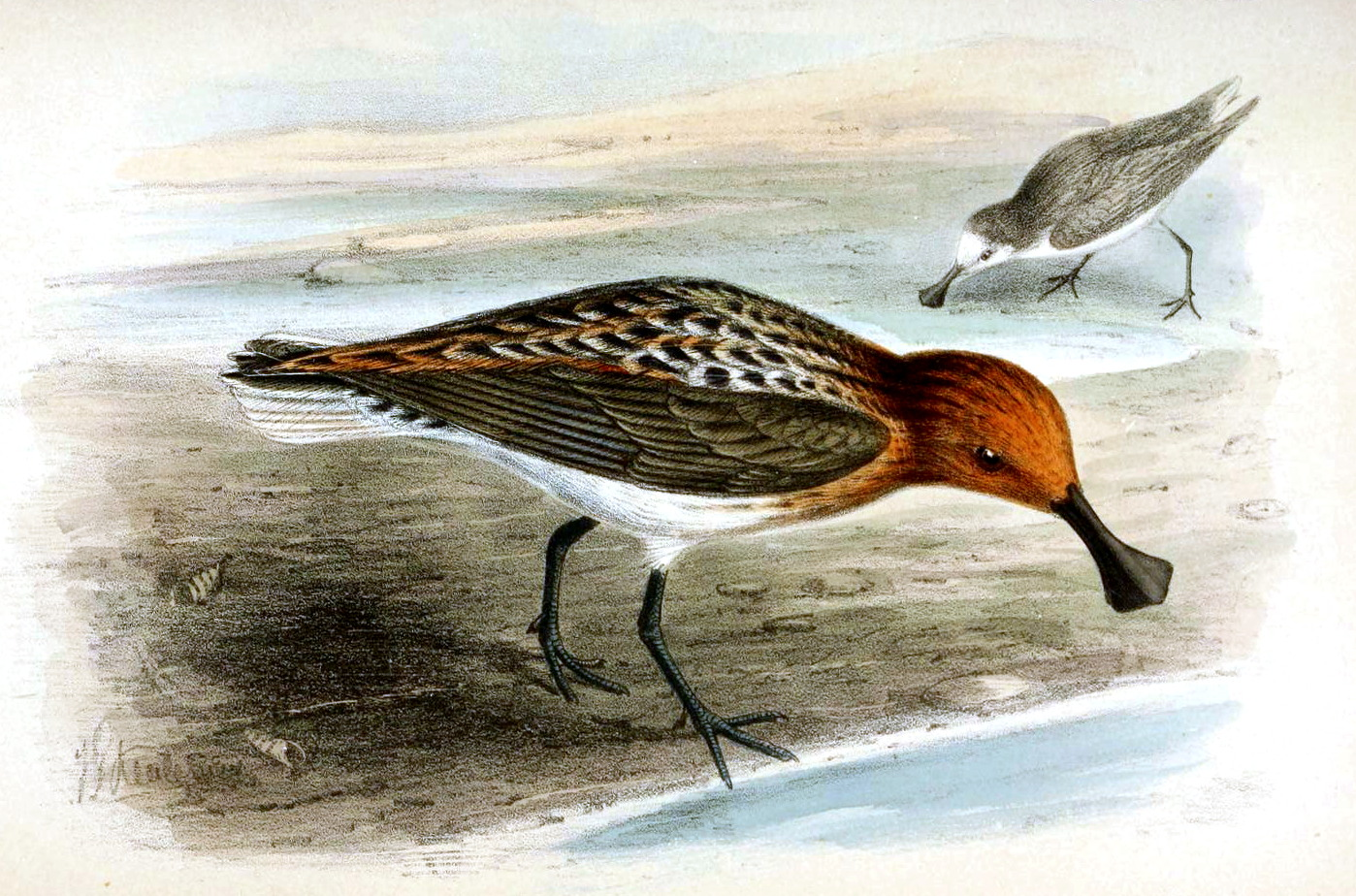
- Breeding

Conservation status
- Critically Endangered (IUCN 3.1)

Scientific classification
- Kingdom: Animalia
- Phylum: Chordata
- Class: Aves
- Order: Charadriiformes
- Family: Scolopacidae
- Genus: Calidris
- Species: C. pygmaea

Binomial name
- Calidris pygmaea (Linnaeus, 1758)

Synonyms
- Platalea pygmea Linnaeus, 1758; Eurynorhynchus pygmeus (Linnaeus, 1758)

= Spoon-billed sandpiper =

Species of bird

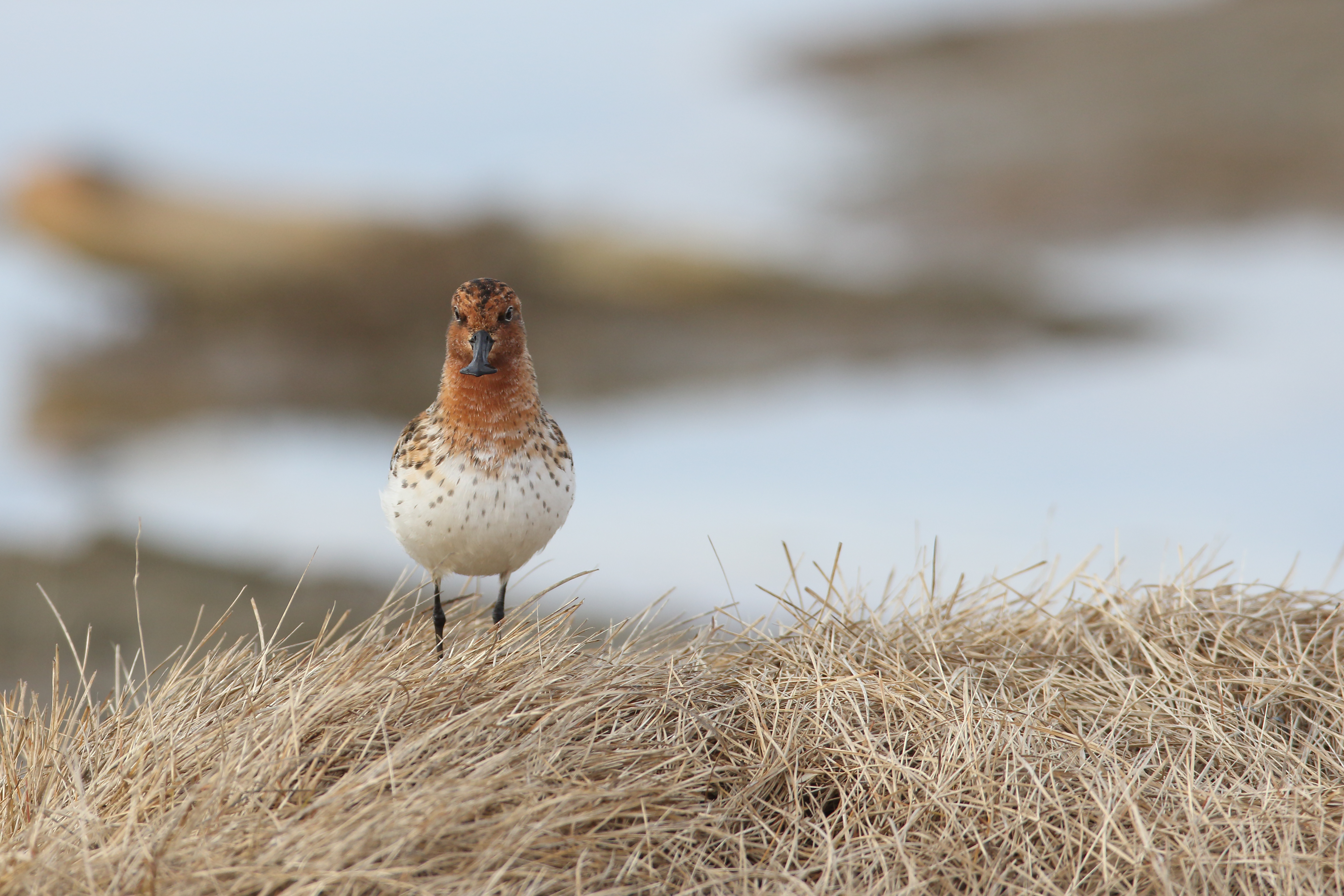
A "spoonie" on the breeding grounds in Chukotka, Siberia, June 2015.

The spoon-billed sandpiper (Calidris pygmaea) is a small wader which breeds on the coasts of the Bering Sea and winters in Southeast Asia. This species is highly threatened, and it is said that since the 1970s the breeding population has decreased significantly. By 2000, the estimated breeding population of the species was 350–500.

== Taxonomy ==
Platalea pygmea was the scientific name proposed by Carl Linnaeus in 1758. It was moved to Eurynorhynchus by Sven Nilsson in 1821. It is now classified under the calidrid sandpipers. Within the genus Calidris the spoon-billed sandpiper is most closely related to the red-necked stint (Calidris ruficollis).

== Description ==
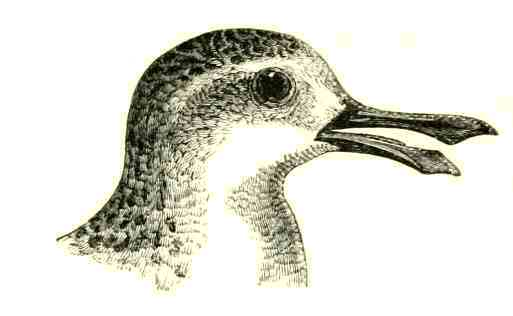
Head

The most distinctive feature of this species is its spatulate bill. The breeding adult bird has a red-brown head, neck and breast with dark brown streaks, blackish upperparts with buff and pale rufous fringing. Non-breeding adults lack the reddish colouration, but have pale brownish-grey upperparts with whitish fringing to the wing-coverts. The underparts are white and the legs are black. It is 14–16 cm (5.5–6.3 in) long.

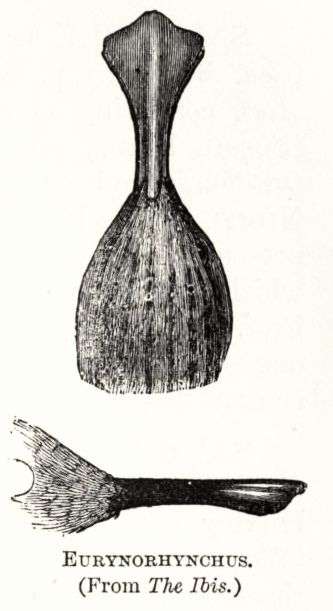
Bill from the side and above

The measurements are; wing 98–106 mm, bill 19–24 mm, bill tip breadth 10–12 mm, tarsus 19–22 mm and tail 37–39 mm.

The contact calls of the spoon-billed sandpiper include a quiet preep or a shrill wheer. The song, given during display, is an intermittent buzzing and descending trill preer-prr-prr. The display flight of the male includes brief hovers, circling and rapid diving while singing.

== Distribution and habitat ==
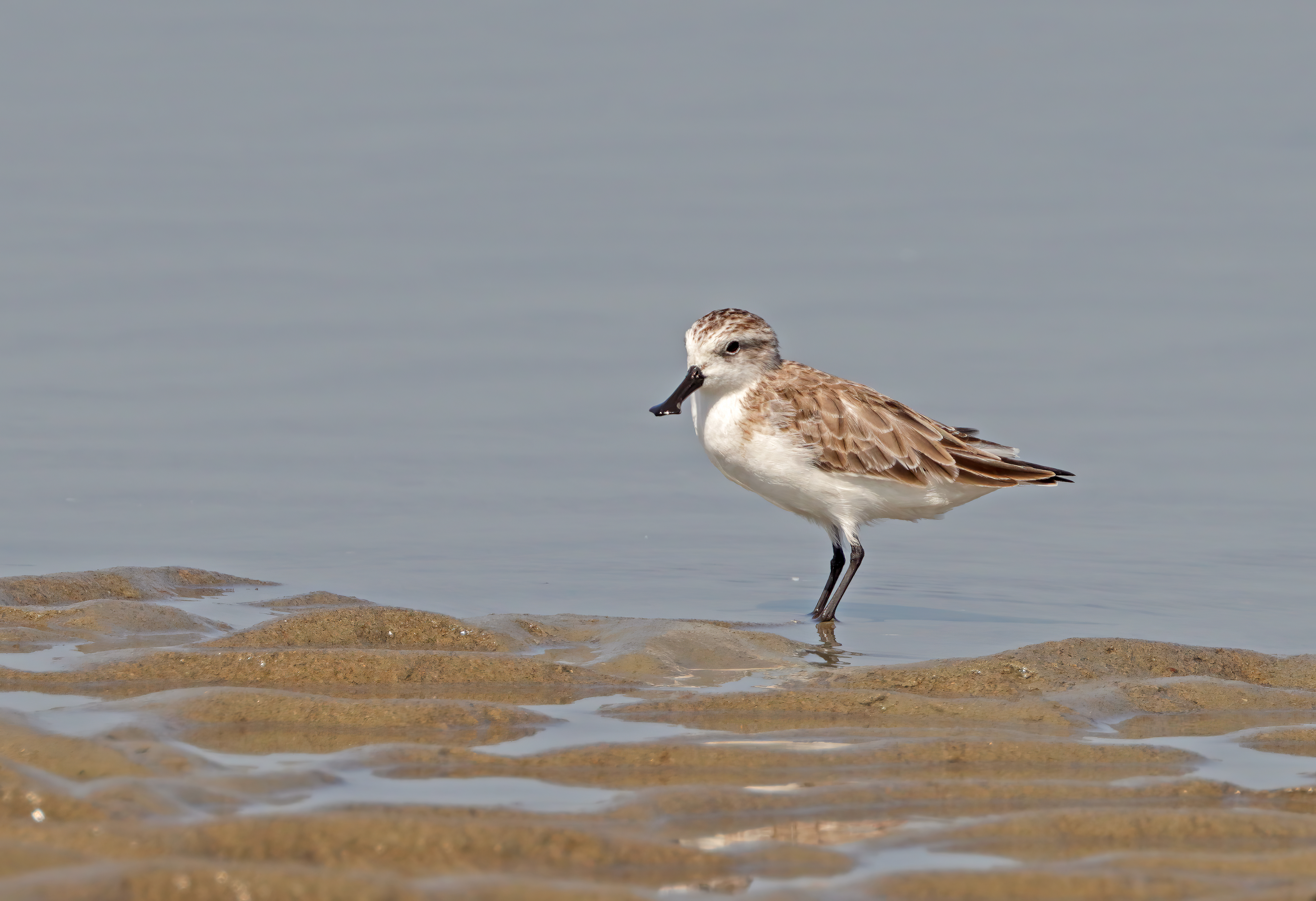
A spoon-billed sandpiper

The spoon-billed sandpiper's breeding habitat is sea coasts and adjacent hinterland on the Chukchi Peninsula and southwards along the isthmus of the Kamchatka Peninsula. It migrates down the Pacific coast through Japan, Korea and China, to its main wintering grounds in south and southeast Asia, where it has been recorded from India, Bangladesh, Sri Lanka, Burma, Thailand, Vietnam, the Philippines, Peninsular Malaysia and Singapore.

Through phylogenetic analyses for the complete mitogenome sequence, South Korean and Chinese C. pygmaea groups were indicated to be closely related to Arenaria interpres because of the similarity in the series of protein-coding genes.

In March 2024, a spoon-billed sandpiper was sighted in the Philippines at Balanga, Bataan mudflat.

== Behaviour and ecology ==
Its feeding style consists of a side-to-side movement of the bill as the bird walks forward with its head down. This species nests in June–July on coastal areas in the tundra, choosing locations with grass close to freshwater pools. Spoon-billed sandpipers feed on the moss in tundras, as well as smaller animal species, like mosquitoes, flies, beetles, and spiders. At certain points in time, they also feed on marine invertebrates such as shrimp and worms.

== Conservation ==
This bird is critically endangered, with a current population of fewer than 2500 – probably fewer than 1000 – mature individuals. The main threats to its survival are habitat loss on its breeding grounds and loss of tidal flats through its migratory and wintering range. The important staging area at Saemangeum, South Korea, has already been partially reclaimed, and the remaining wetlands are under serious threat of reclamation in the near future. Long-term remote sensing studies have shown that up to 65% of key spoon-billed sandpiper habitat in China, South Korea and North Korea has been destroyed by reclamation. A 2010 study suggests that hunting in Burma by traditional bird trappers is a primary cause of the decline.

Protected areas in its staging and wintering areas include Yancheng in China, Mai Po Marshes in Hong Kong and Point Calimere and Chilka lake in India. As of 2016, the global spoon-billed sandpiper population was estimated at 240–456 mature individuals or at maximum 228 pairs.

Formerly classified as Endangered by the IUCN, recent research shows that its numbers are decreasing more and more rapidly and that it is on the verge of extinction. It was consequently reclassified to Critically Endangered status in 2008. The population was estimated at only 120–200 pairs in 2009–2010, perhaps indicating an 88% decline since 2002 equating to an annual rate of decline of 26%. Land reclamation of the Saemangeum estuary in South Korea removed an important migration staging point, and hunting on the important wintering grounds in Burma has emerged as a serious threat. This species may become extinct in 10–20 years.

In November 2011, thirteen spoon-billed sandpipers arrived at the Wildfowl and Wetlands Trust (WWT) reserve in Slimbridge, Gloucestershire, United Kingdom to start a breeding programme. The birds hatched from eggs collected in remote northeastern Russian tundra earlier and spent 60 days in Moscow Zoo in quarantine in preparation for the 8,000 km journey. Artificial incubation and captive rearing, termed headstarting, were expected to increase survival rates from less than 25% to over 75%, and the removal of eggs was expected to lead to a second clutch reared by the parents. In 2019, almost a decade since the rescue mission, the two birds were first to be born in a UK spoon-billed sandpiper ark. In 2013, conservationists hatched twenty chicks in Chukotka.

An education kit for teaching about the bird and about environmental conservation (in English, Traditional Chinese, Simplified Chinese, Japanese and Burmese) is being used to help wetland conservation in the countries it inhabits.

In 2025, the Natural Resources and Planning Bureau of Nantong released a draft plan designating two areas (plots TZW-10 and TZW-11) in the Tongzhou Bay for the construction of a port logistics base and industrial use. These plots are identified by conservationists as important stopover sites for migratory shorebirds including the spoon-billed sandpiper. Environmental groups and members of the public expressed concern that such development could adversely affect local wildlife and habitats, as the document does not specify corresponding protection or mitigation measures. According to Jianghai Evening News, coastal wetlands along Nantong, including Xiaoyangkou, Fengli, Dongling, Tongzhou Bay, Li’a Mountain and the northern branch of the Yangtze estuary, lie on the East Asian–Australasian Flyway and provide stopover sites for nearly 80 species and hundreds of thousands of migratory waterbirds each year. Among them, thirteen species of shorebirds—including the spoon-billed sandpiper, little stint and bar-tailed godwit—exceed 1% of their global populations as estimated in the fifth edition of Waterbird Population Estimates (WPE5), meeting the criteria of the Ramsar Convention for wetlands of international importance.
