= Wolmyeong Park =

Park in Gunsan, South Korea

Coordinates: 35.981°N 126.692°E

- Wolmyeongdong Park
- 월명공원
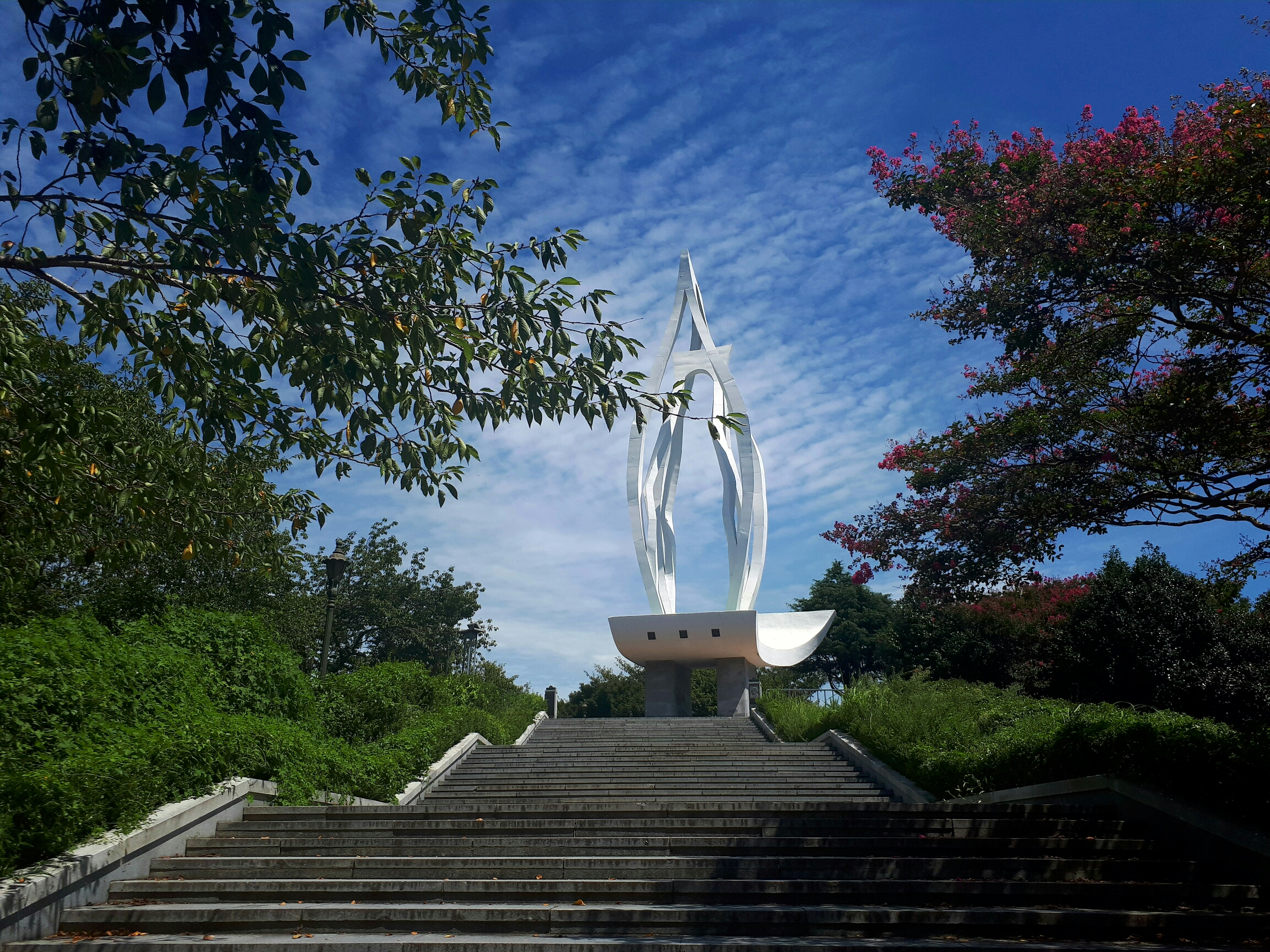
- Interactive map of Wolmyeong Park
- Location: Haemang-dong, Gunsan, North Jeolla Province, South Korea
- Area: 2.6 square kilometres (1.0 mi^{2})
- Elevation: 16 metres (52 ft)
- Open: All year round
- Parking: Available

Wolmyeong Park (Korean: 월명공원; lit. 'Bright Moon Park'), also Wolmyeongdong Park, is a park in Gunsan, South Korea.

It is located at the intersection of five mountains. The total size of the park is 2.6 km^{2} (1.0 sq mi), and its longest walking trail is 12 km (7.5 mi). It is open year-round.

== Attractions ==
From the top of Susi Tower one can see all of Gunsan City, the sea to the south of Gunsan, the mouth of the Geum River, and the giant Janghang smelting factory.

At the foot of Seollim Mountain is an old temple, Eunjeoksa. Between Seollim Mountain and Jeombang Mountain is the Jeil Reservoir.

The park also contains an observatory, a sculpture garden, and various monuments.

The gardens have been well kept, and 31-year old rattan and cherry trees can be seen.

The park during April is covered in cherry blossoms. During that time in April, a cherry blossom photo contest is held at the park.
