= Saemangeum =

Tidal flat in South Korea

Coordinates: 35°49′00″N 126°37′20″E

- Hangul: 새만금
- Hanja: 새萬金
- RR: Saemangeum
- MR: Saeman'gŭm

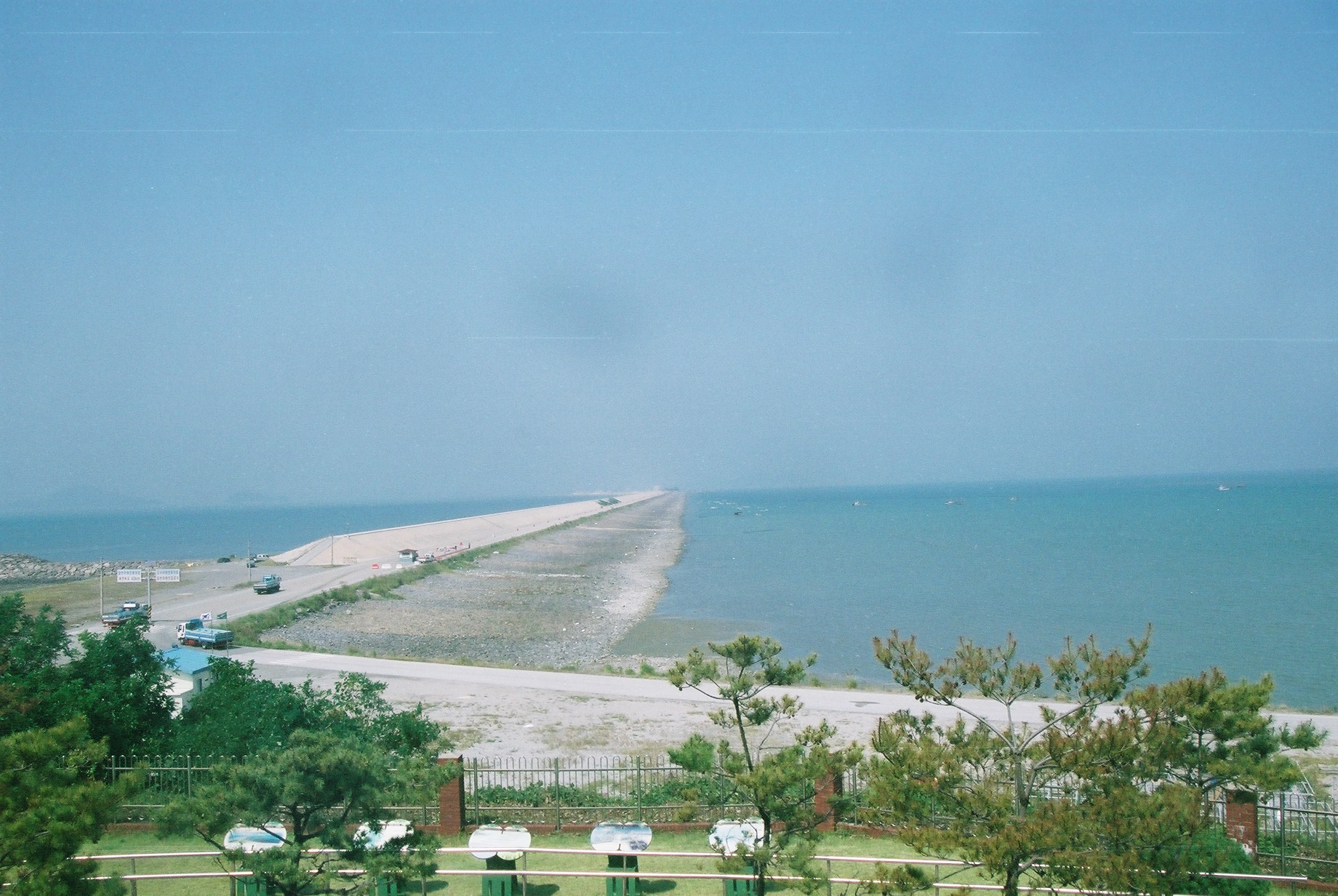
A view of the Saemangeum Seawall

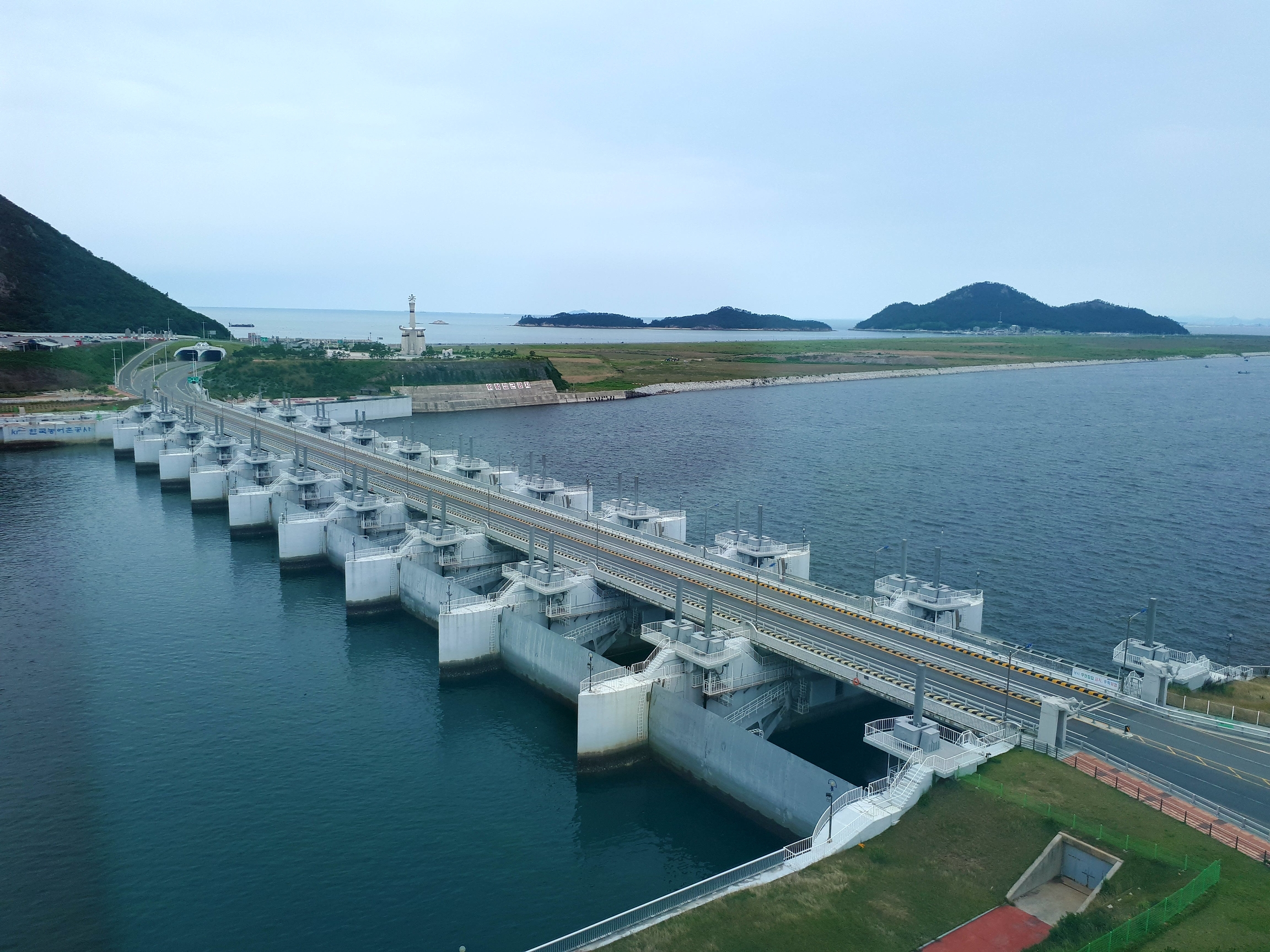
Sinsi sluice gate of Saemangeum Seawall

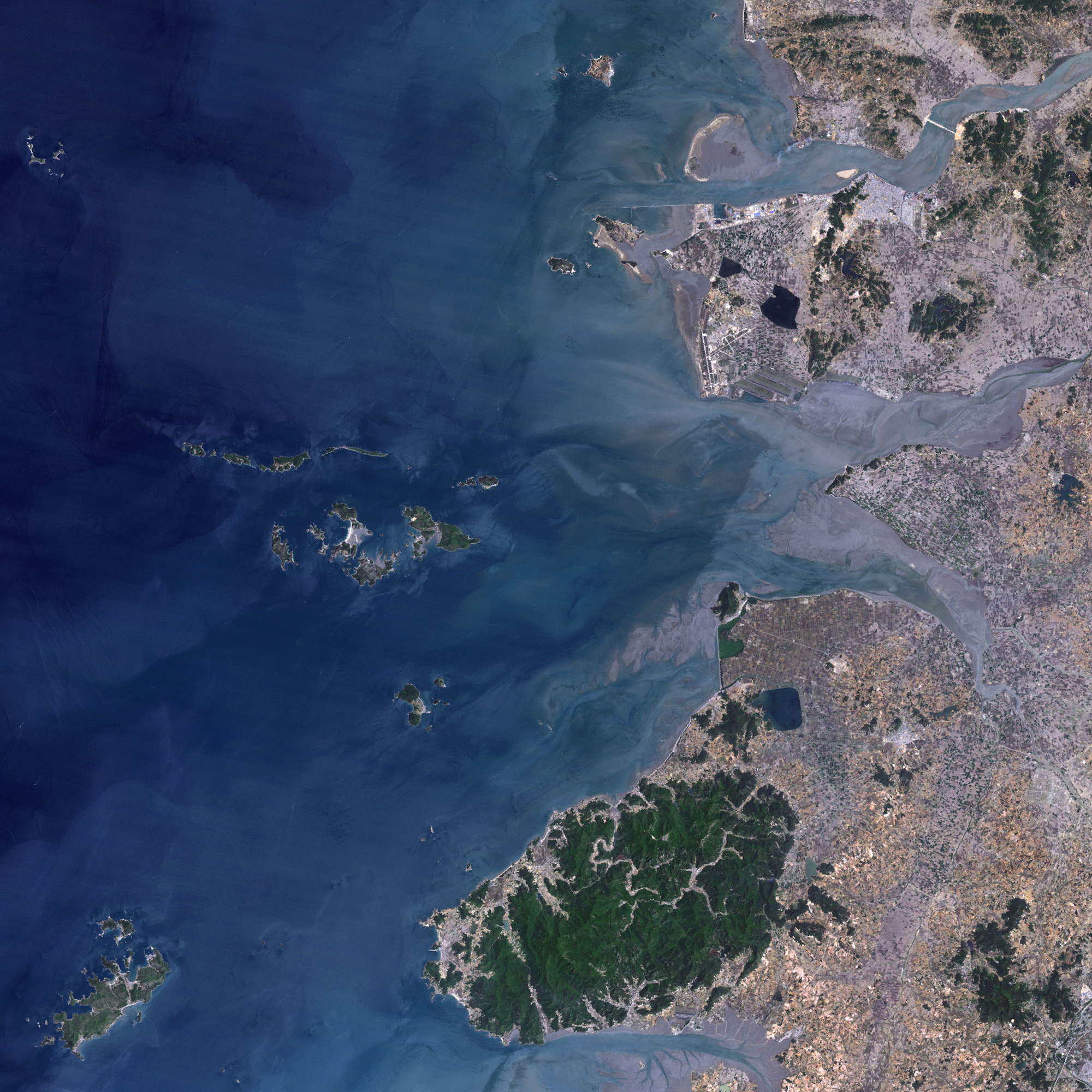
Before reclamation. Taken in March 1989

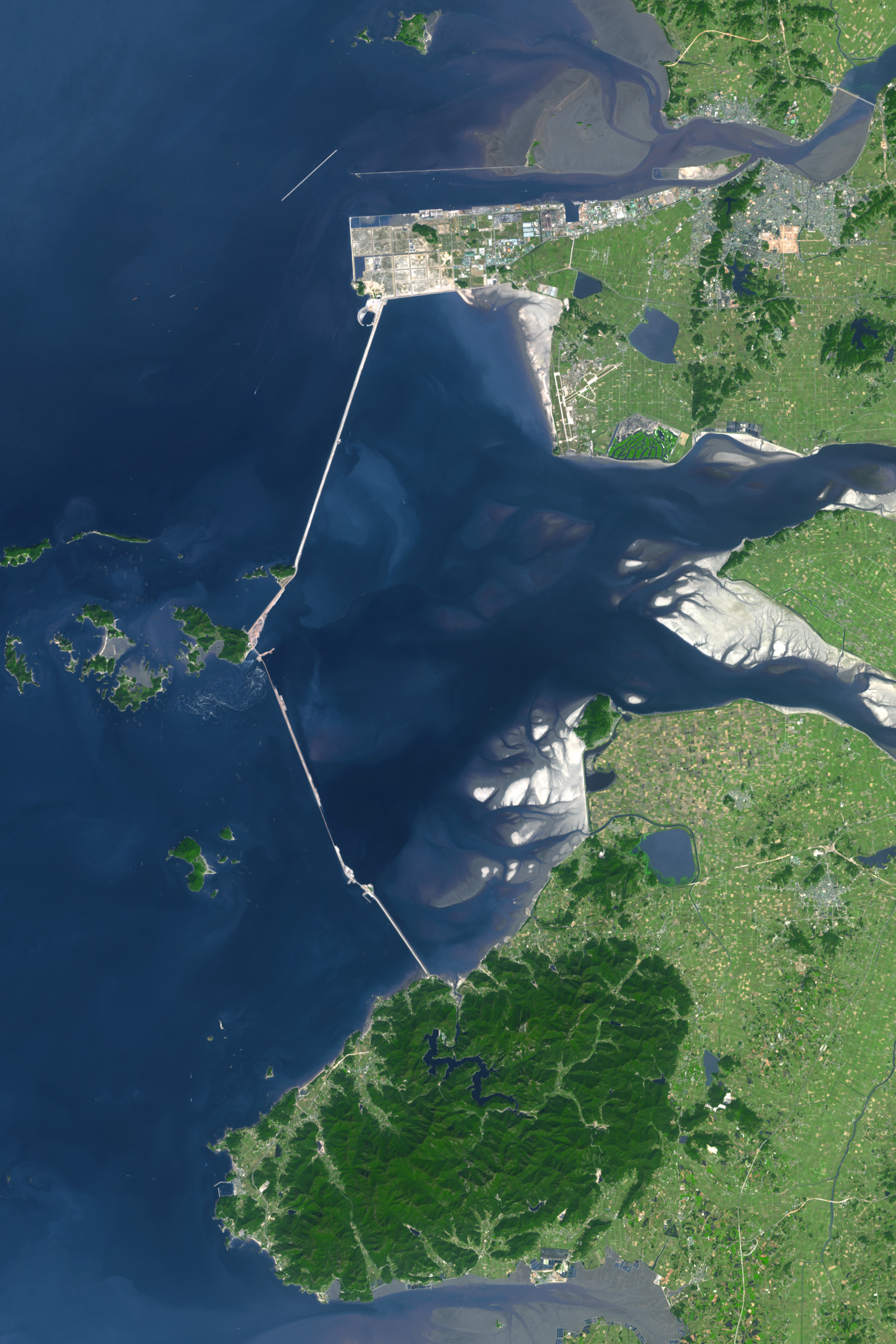
Satellite image of Saemangeum taken in October 2006

A comparison of the Saemangeum Estuary between 1989 and 2006

Saemangeum (Korean pronunciation: [sɛmanɡɯm]) is an estuarine tidal flat on the coast of the Yellow Sea in South Korea. It was dammed by the government of South Korea's Saemangeum Seawall Project, completed in 2006, after a long fight between the government and environmental activists, and is scheduled to be converted into either agricultural or industrial land. Prior to 2010, it had played an important role as a habitat for migratory birds.

== Impact ==
The completion of this seawall is likely to be a major contributor to the decline of many species. Around 400,000 shorebirds depended on the Saemangeum estuary mudflats as an important feeding ground on the 24,000 km migration between Asia and Alaska and Russia, including the two endangered waders Nordmann's greenshank and spoon-billed sandpiper (each species with fewer than a thousand surviving birds). A conservation organisation has accused authorities of having failed to monitor the project's impact on local wildlife in a transparent way, and carried out an independent monitoring program in 2006.

== History ==
The Saemangeum lies at the mouths of the Dongjin and Mangyeong Rivers, on the coast of Jeollabuk-do. It is just south of the estuary of the Geum River. Neighboring districts include Gunsan City, Buan County, and Gimje City.

The project of filling in the estuary began in 1991, but was slowed by a series of court actions by environmentalists. The completed seawall is some 33 kilometers long, and replaces a coastline that was once more than 100 kilometers long. After the estuary has been completely filled, an area of about 400 km^{2} (roughly two-thirds the size of Seoul) will have been added to the Korean Peninsula, making it one of the biggest land reclamation projects in history.

The estuary was originally called "Mangeum" (萬金). This name was probably formed from combining the first character of "Mangyeong" and that of "Gimje."

Saemangeum was completed on April 27, 2010, officially becoming the longest seawall ever built with the length of 33.9 km, breaking the record of Zuiderzee Works from 1932.

On August 2, 2010, Saemangeum was certified by Guinness World Records as the longest man-made sea barrier in the world.

Saemangeum was the venue of the 25th World Scout Jamboree, hosted by the Korea Scout Association.

== See also ==
- Environment of South Korea
- Geography of South Korea
- Rivers of South Korea
- Saemangeum Seawall
