= Seonyudo, Gunsan =

Island in North Jeolla, South Korea

Coordinates: 35°49′07″N 126°24′49″E

Seonyudo
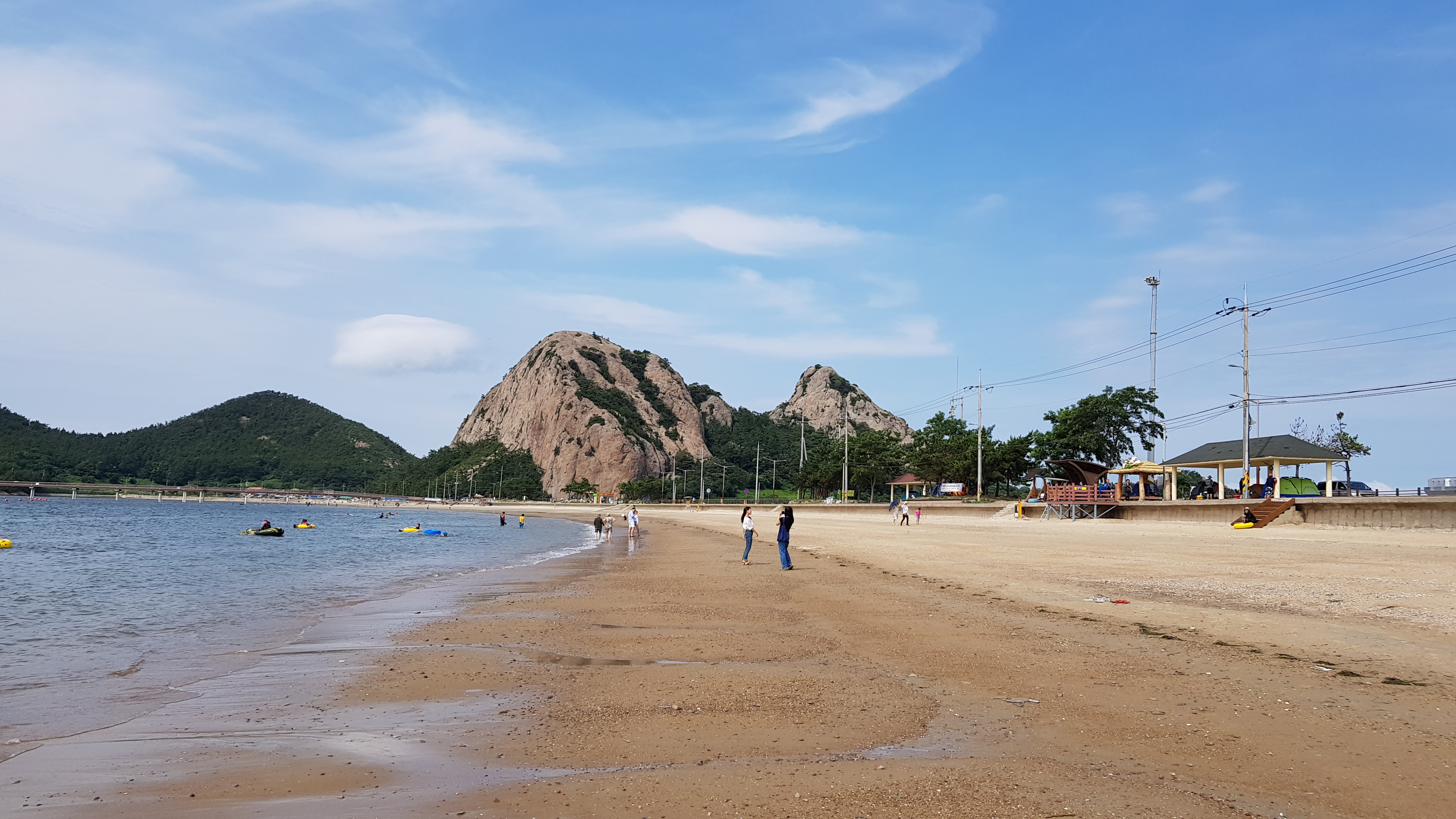
- Interactive map of Seonyudo

Korean name
- Hangul: 선유도
- Hanja: 仙遊島
- Lit.: Island where the immortals play
- RR: Seonyudo
- MR: Sŏnyudo

Seonyudo (Korean: 선유도) is an island in Okdo-myeon, Gunsan, North Jeolla Province, South Korea. The island has an area of 2.12 km^{2}, which is only about a quarter of Yeouido in Seoul. The island's coast is about 12.8 km long.

It has long been famed for its beauty; its name means "island where the immortals play", which implicitly assumes its beauty was fit for the gods. It is a popular tourist attraction, and is known for its white sandy beaches, waterfall, and scenic mountains.

Seonyudo was the capital of the Gogunsan Islands. It also served as a naval command post during the Joseon Dynasty. Admiral Yi Sun-shin played an important role during the Imjin War, spending days on the islands to prepare for his next battle after winning the Battle of Myeongnyang.

== Gallery ==
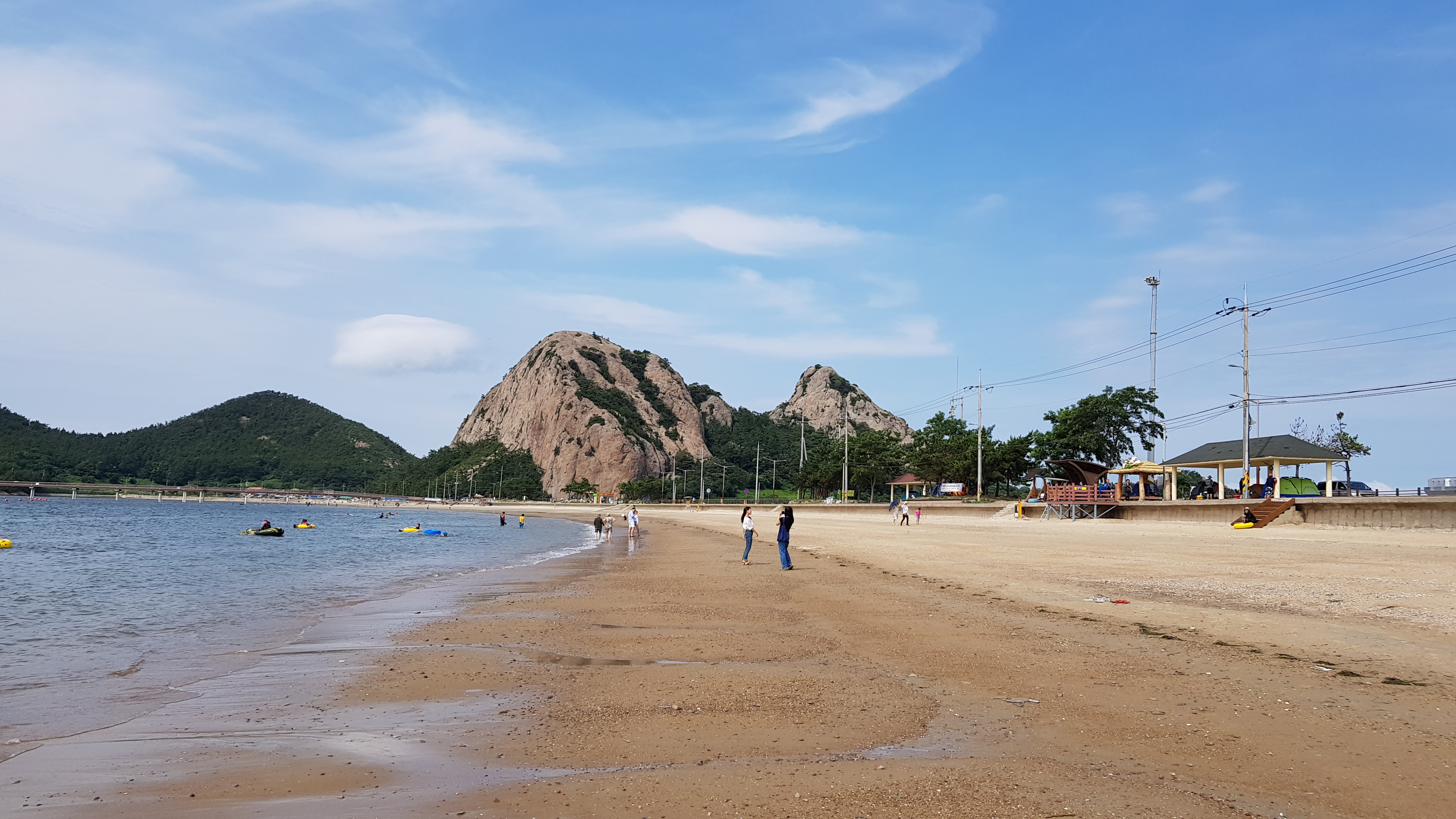

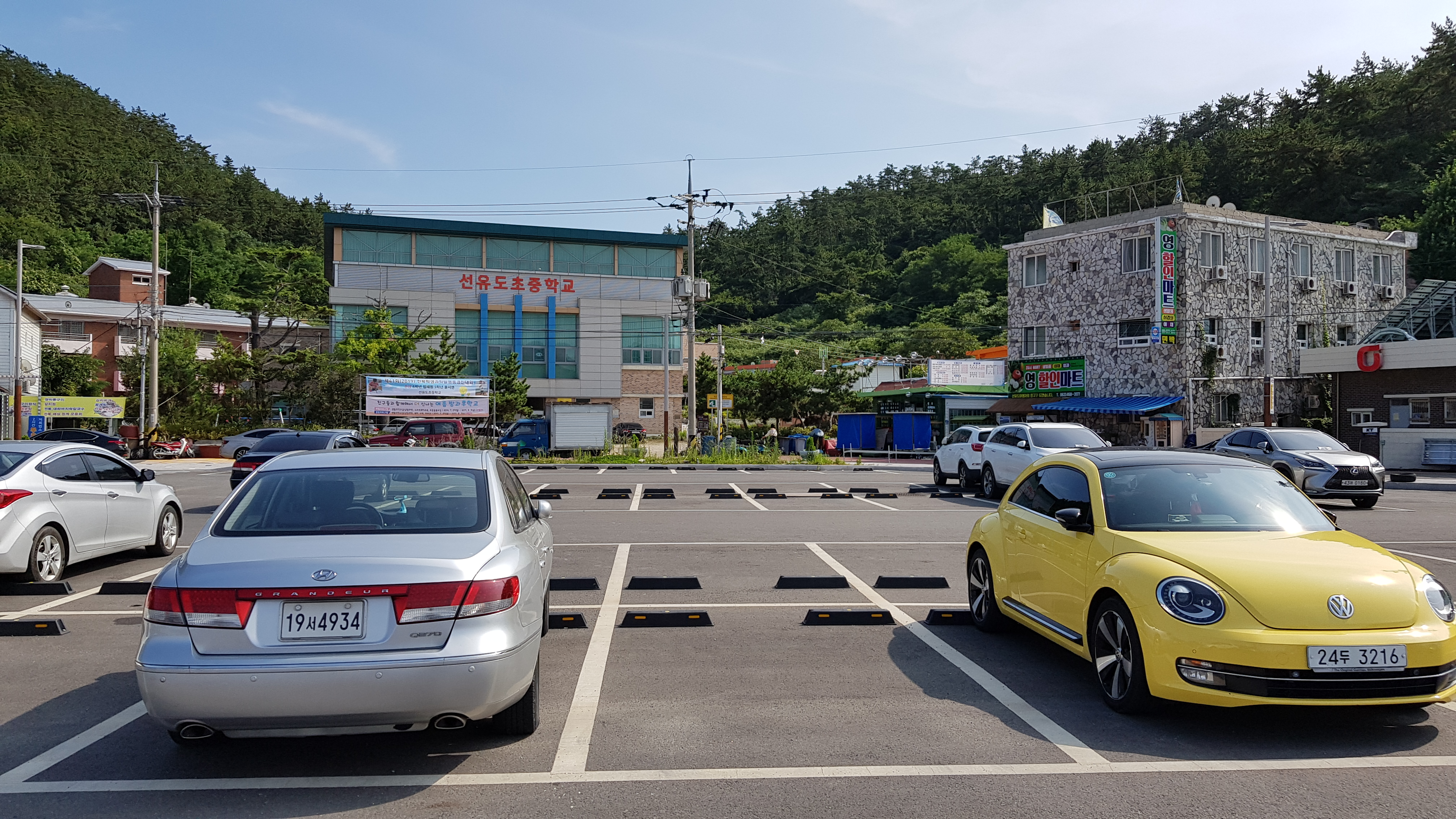

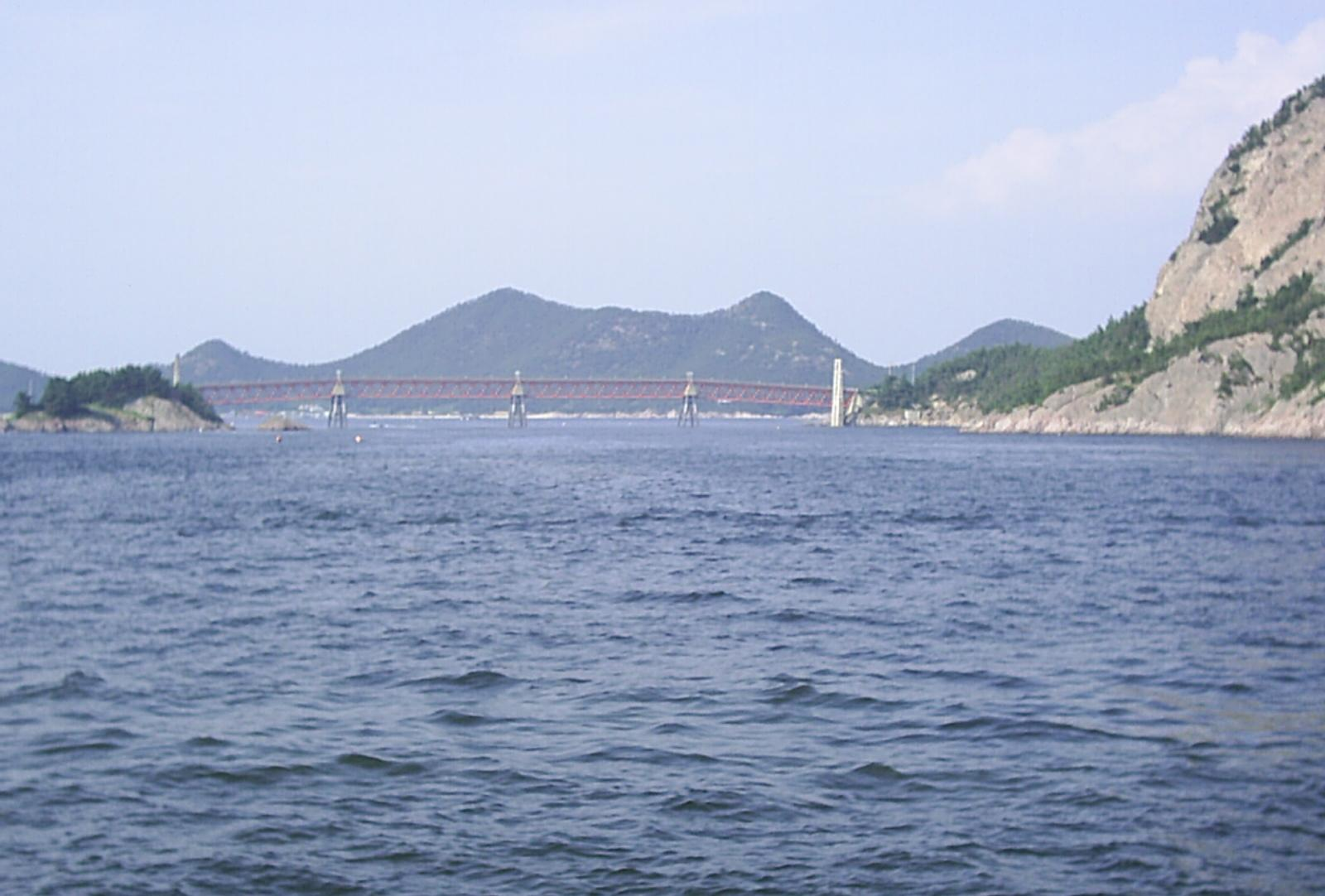
Bridge between Seonyudo and Jangjado
