= Gunsan =

City in North Jeolla, South Korea

- Municipal City
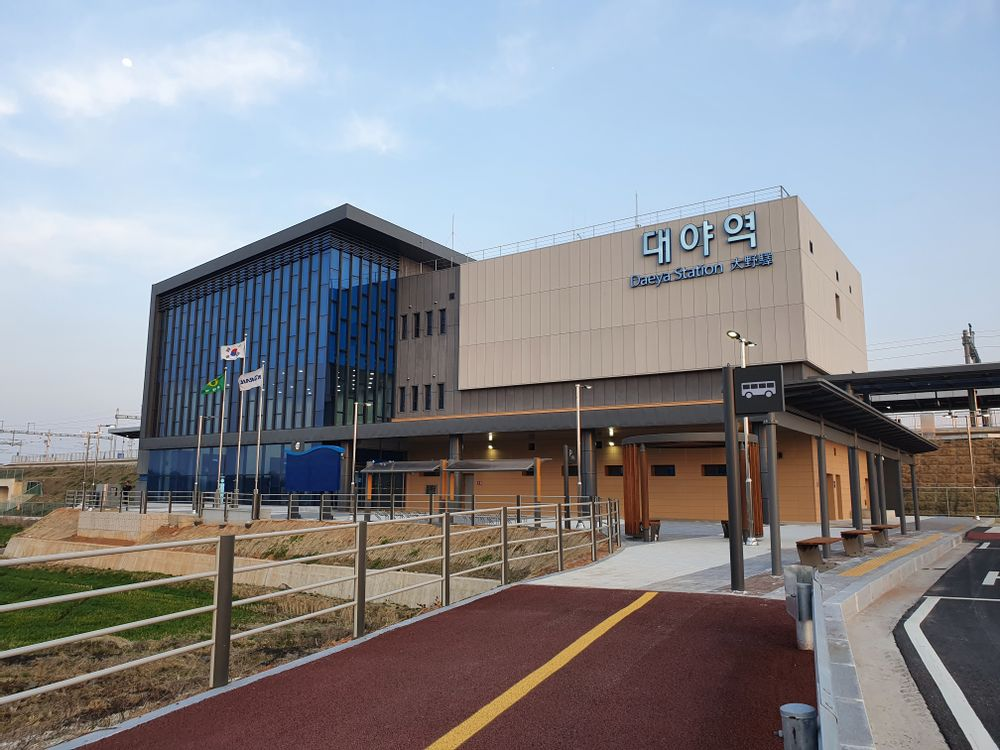
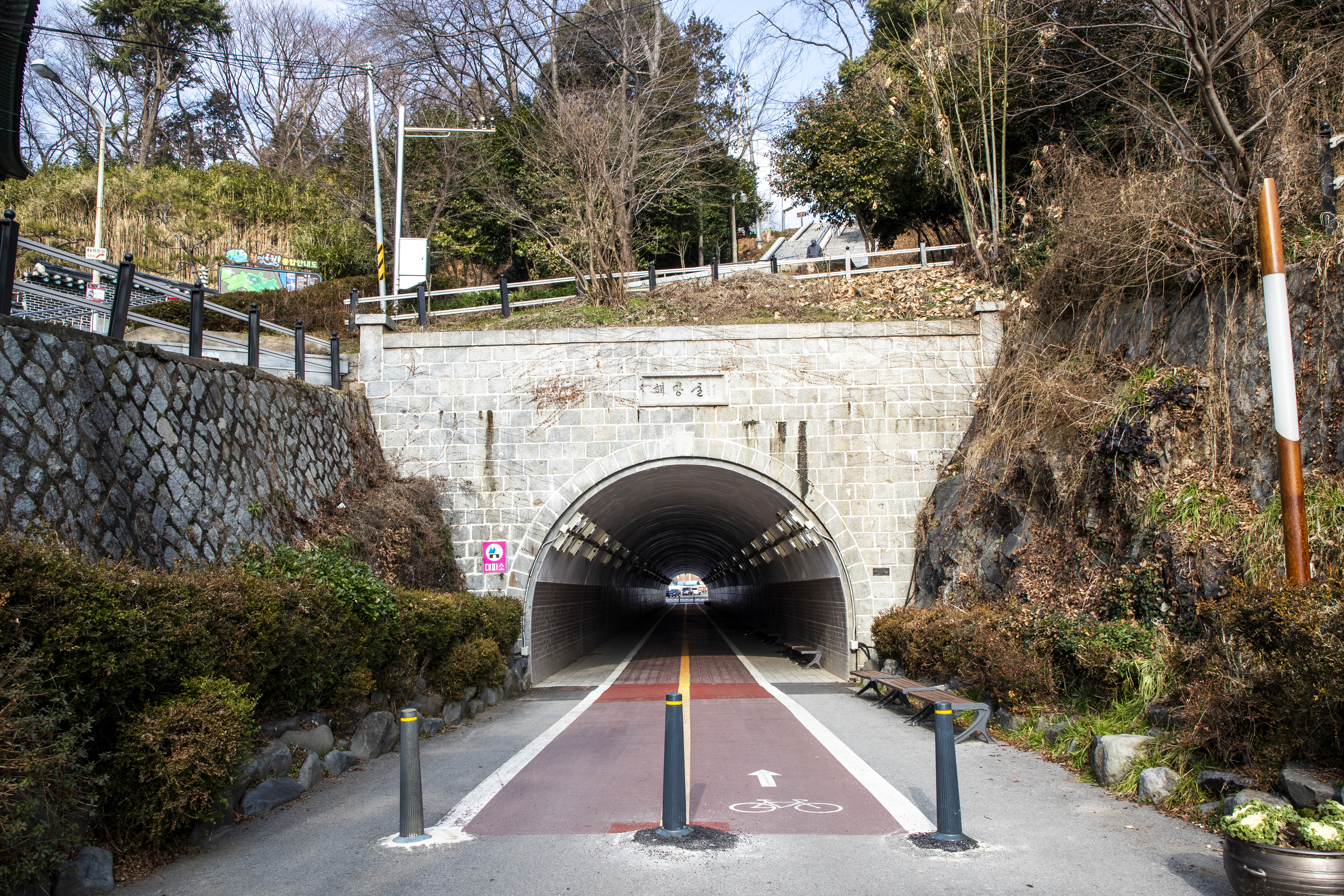
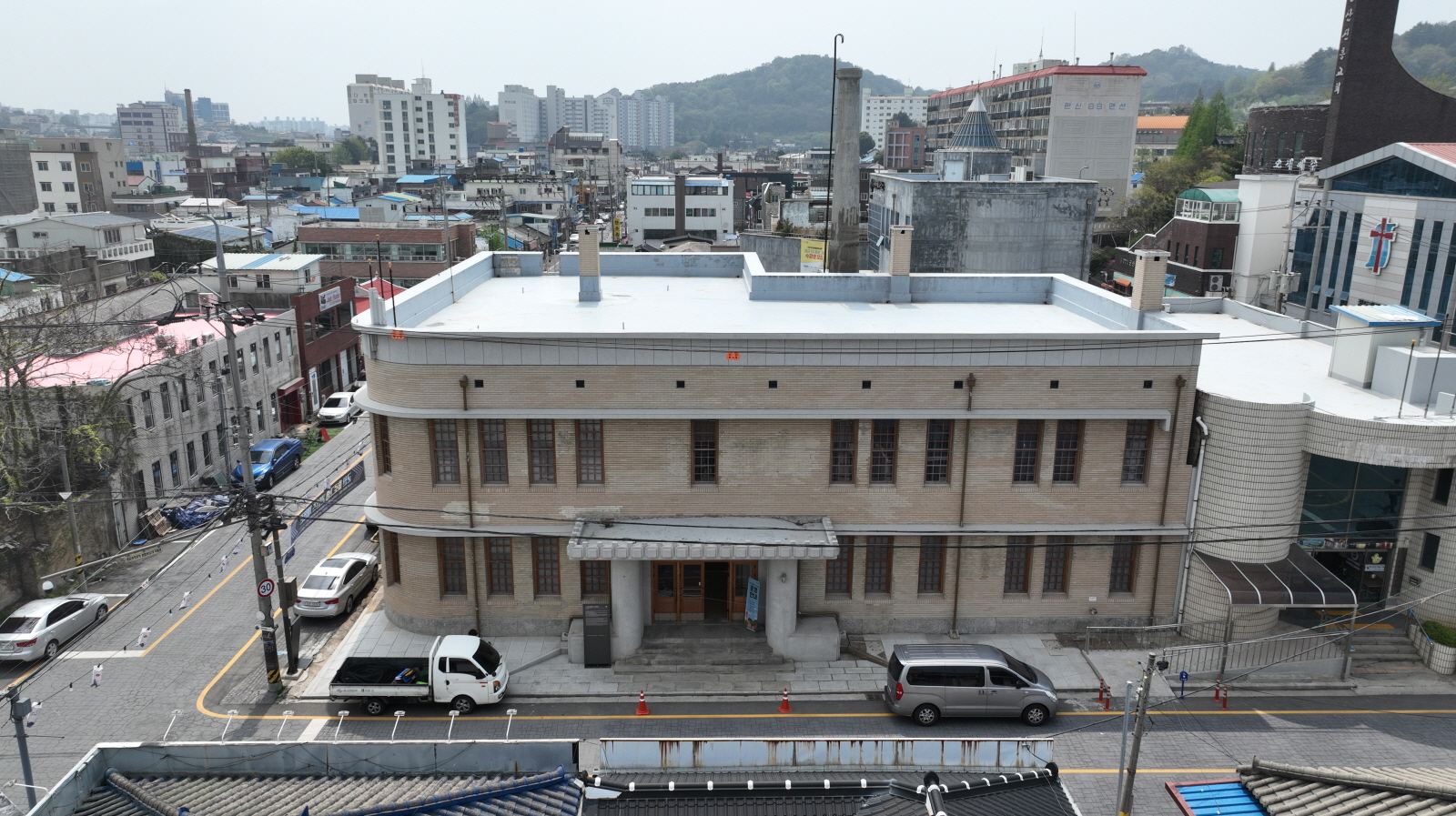
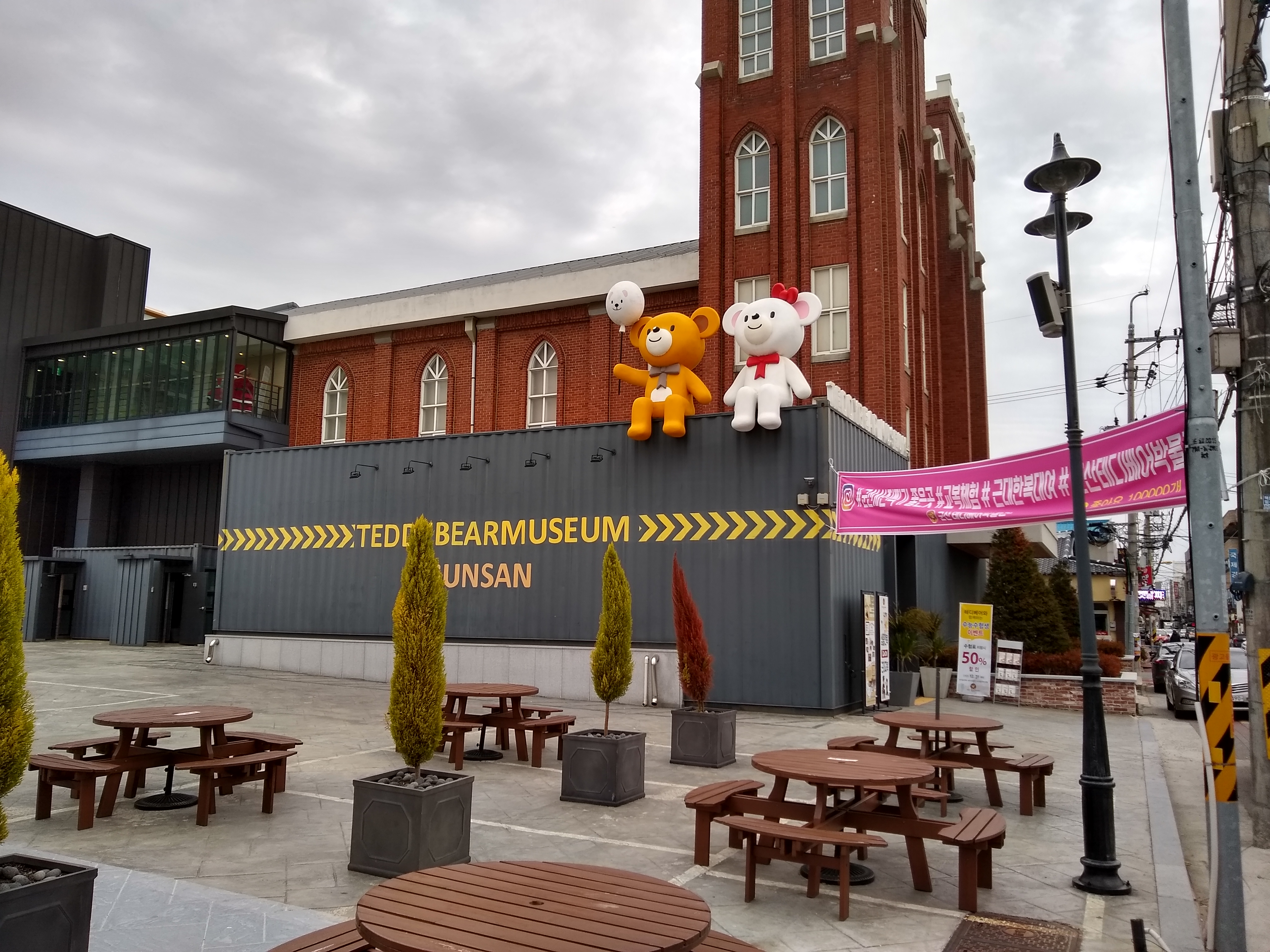
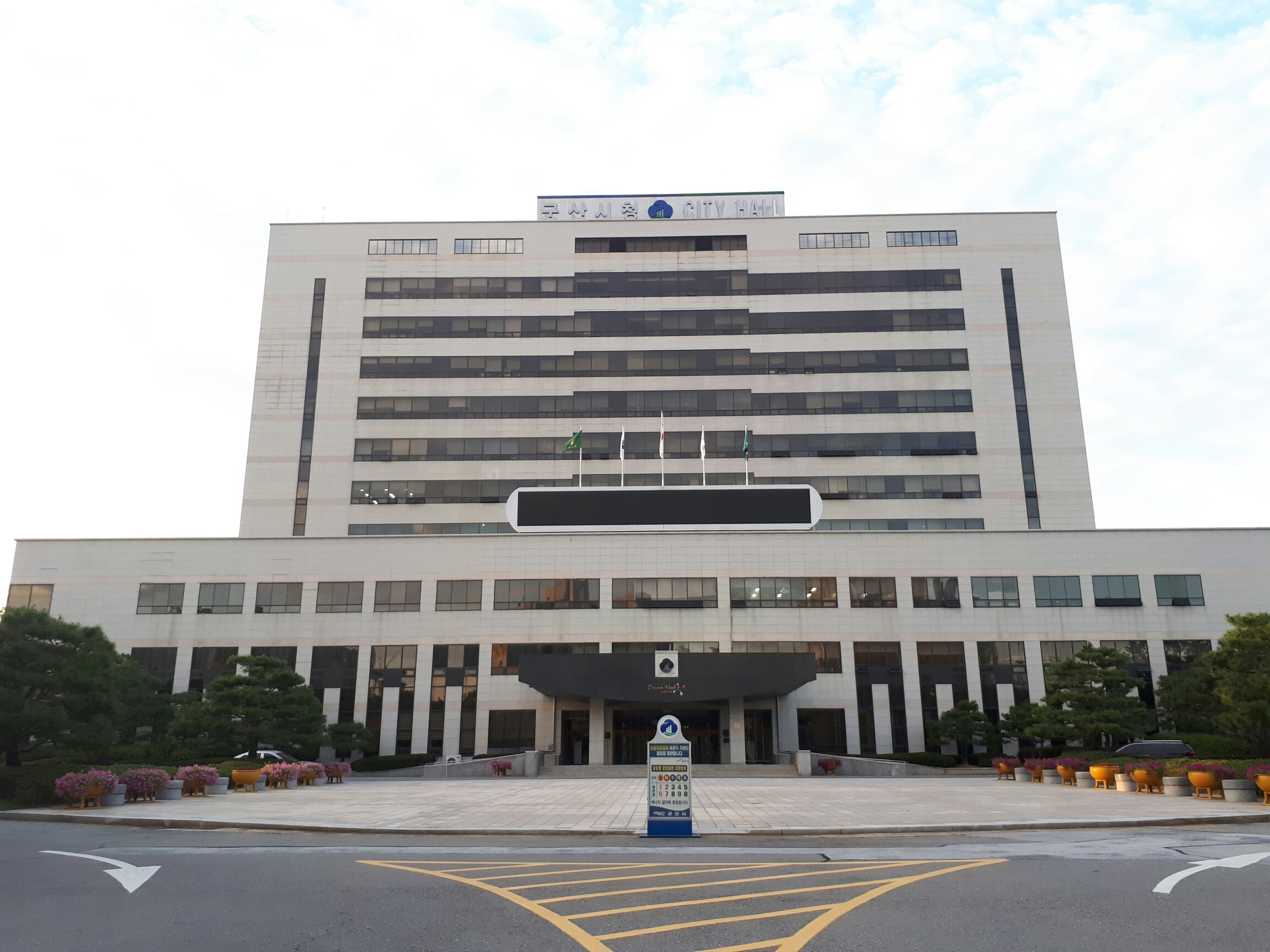
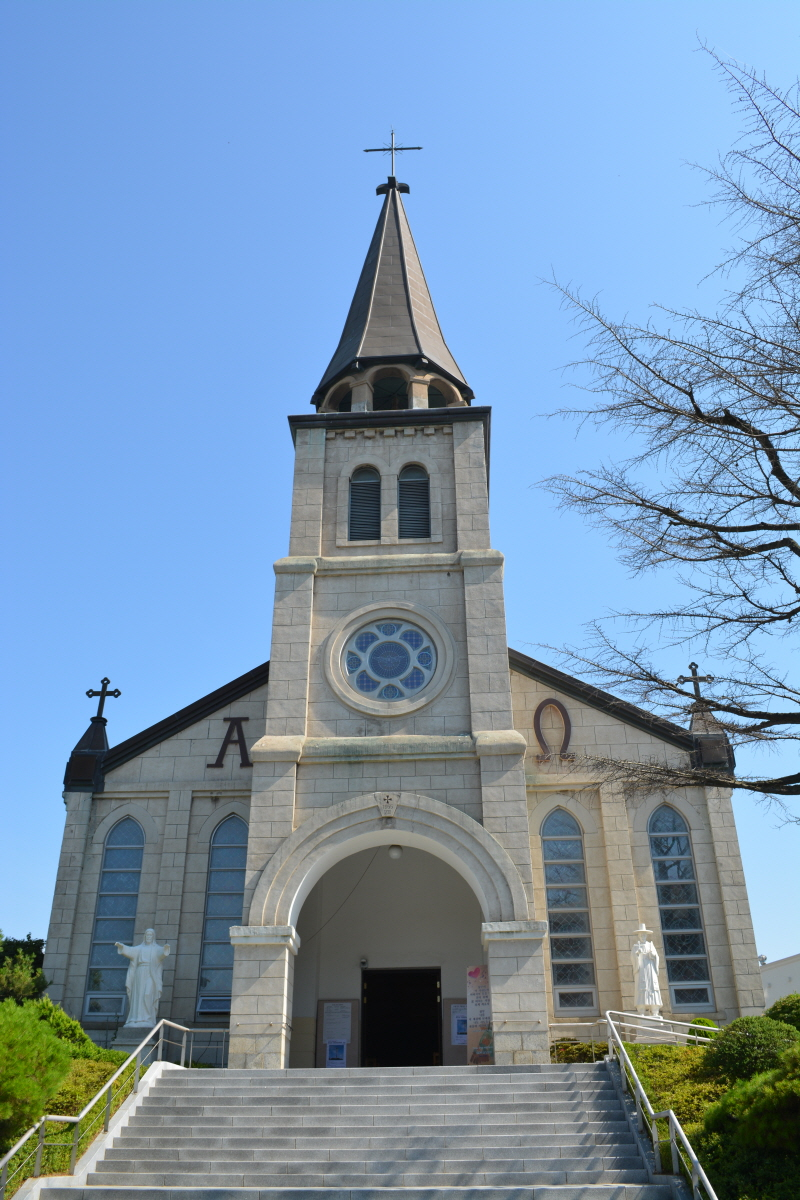
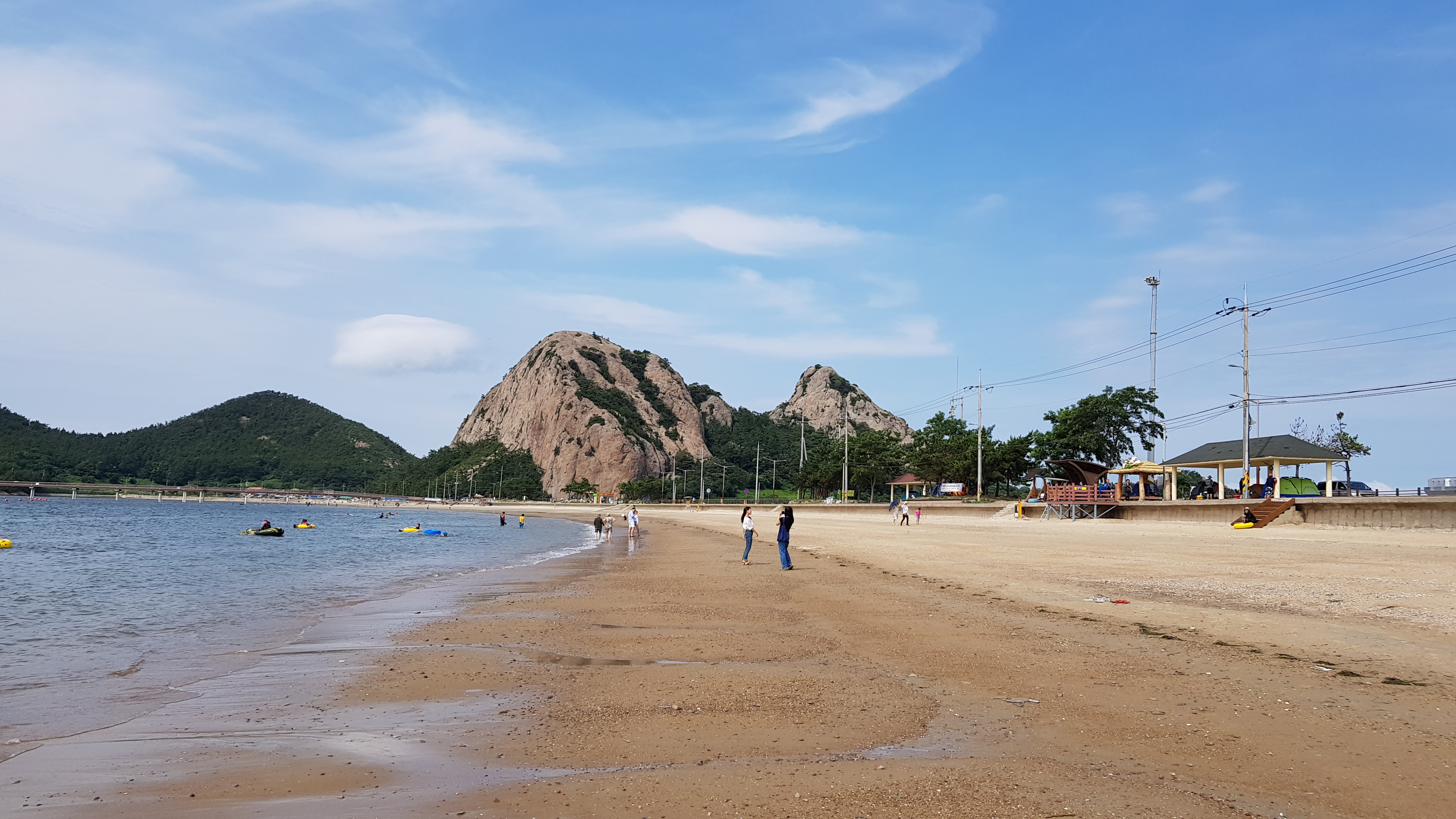
- From the left: Daeya Station, Haemang Cave, Former Gunsan Branch of Korean Food Corporation, Teddy Bear Museum, Gunsan City Hall, Dunyul-dong Cathedral, Seonyudo

- Flag

- Location in South Korea
- Coordinates: 35°59′N 126°43′E
- Country: South Korea
- State: Jeonbuk
- Administrative divisions: 1 eup, 10 myeon, 19 dong

Government
  - mayor: Kang Im-jun (강임준)

Area
  - Total: 377.72 km^{2} (145.84 sq mi)

Population (September 2024)
  - Total: 264,656
  - Density: 700.67/km^{2} (1,814.7/sq mi)
  - Dialect: Jeolla
- Time zone: UTC+9 (Korea Standard Time)
- Area code: +82-63
- Flower: Camellia
- Tree: Ginko biloba
- Bird: Common gull

Korean name
- Hangul: 군산시
- Hanja: 群山市
- RR: Gunsan-si
- MR: Kunsan-si

Gunsan (Korean: 군산; [kun.sʰan]), also romanized as Kunsan, is a city in North Jeolla Province, South Korea. It is on the south bank of the Geum River just upstream from its exit into the Yellow Sea. It has emerged as a high-tech manufacturing industrial city and an international trade seaport that is approximately 200 km (120 mi) southwest of Seoul on the midwest coast of the Korean Peninsula.

Kunsan Air Base operated by the United States Air Force is in the city. To encourage investment, a free trade zone has been declared.

== History ==
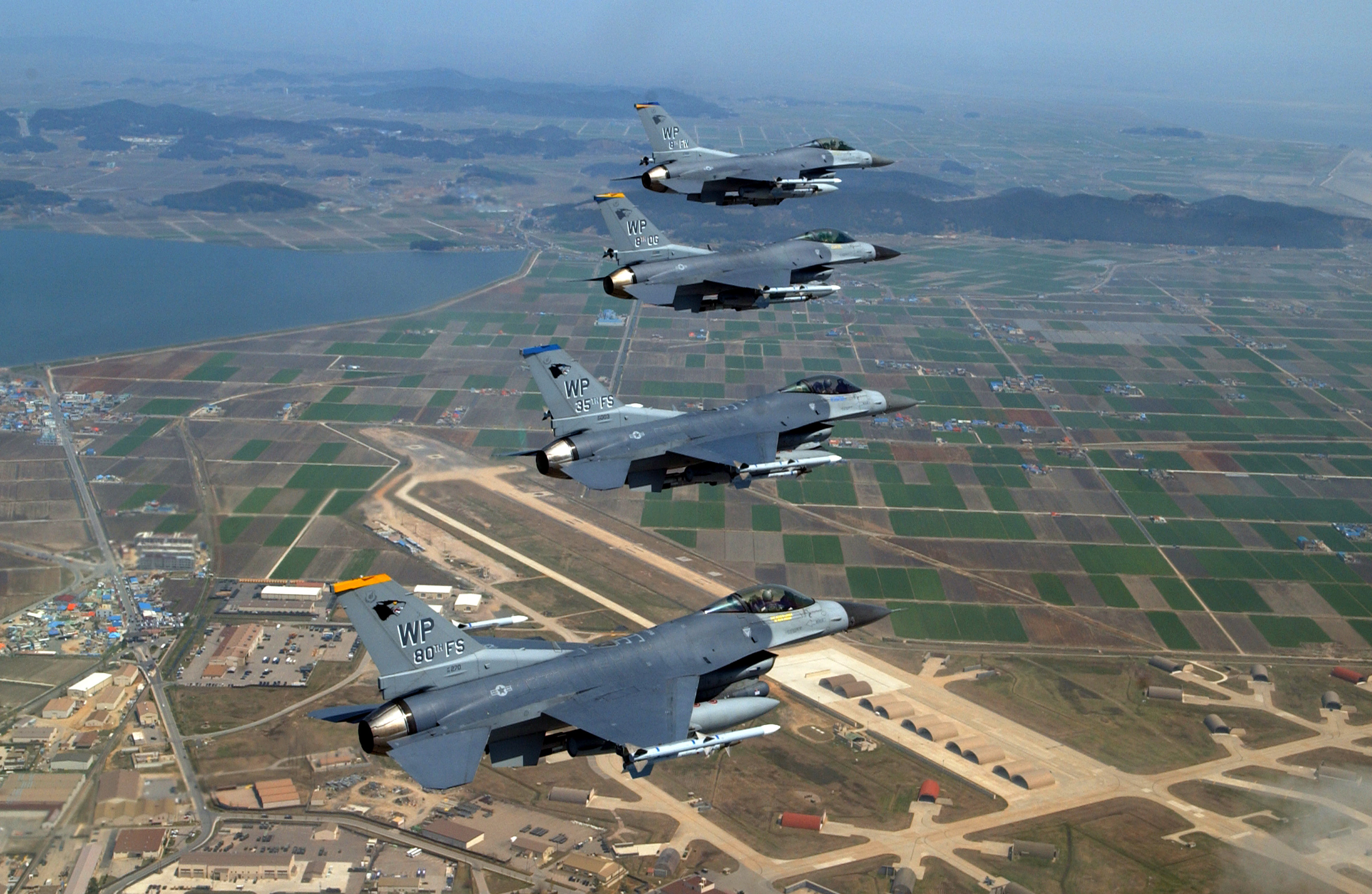
Kunsan Air Base

Gunsan was a small fishing village on the banks of the Geum River, near where the river spills into the Yellow Sea. It sits on the fertile western Honam plain where much rice is harvested. Gunsan became a port in the late 19th century largely due to pressure from the Japanese on the Koreans to ship rice to Japan. In 1899, Gunsan Port officially opened up to international trade. Gunsan was largely settled by Japanese during the period of the Japanese occupation, and was known as Gunzan. The old (now demolished) City Hall and the Customs House are of Japanese construction. After liberation from the Japanese in 1945, Gunsan began to grow slowly.

Emblem of Gunzanfu(gunsan bu), the administrative division gunsan fell under Japanese rule.

The Korean War of the 1950s left the Gunsan area relatively unscathed. The initial drive south by the Communist North Koreans pushed the United Nations and South Korean forces toward Busan so quickly that Gunsan was spared from protracted fighting.

Nevertheless, a battalion of ROK Marines, entrenched in the hills above Gunsan Port, withheld overwhelming DPRK forces. Their courageous engagement created extra time for the evacuation of the town and port. The action is commemorated with a monument on the ridgeline where the heaviest fighting occurred. (35°59′26″N 126°42′16″E)

The drive north by the United Nations forces occurred so rapidly that there was little direct confrontation in the area. After the cessation of hostilities, the United States Air Force occupied nearby Kunsan Air Base, which has affected Gunsan.

Kunsan Air Base was originally constructed, under Japanese direction, by reclaiming mudflats starting in around 1923. Kunsan Air Base has hosted a variety of USAF combat aircraft. The proximity of US service members to Gunsan has provided some economic growth to Gunsan, but the base's influence has waned since the 1990s as a result of a more powerful and diversified Korean economy. The downtown shopping districts that catered to US troops have transformed into areas that are indistinguishable from surrounding areas that serve Korean shoppers. Only a few remaining stores hint at the area's previous manifestation as an American shopping district. The small Okku-Silver Town (or more popularly America Town) caters to US troops. About 5 km (3.1 mi) from the main gate of Kunsan Air Base, America Town hosts bars, dance clubs, restaurants, and souvenir shops.

== Economy ==
Today, Gunsan's economy thrives on fishing, agriculture and heavy industry west of the city in the reclaimed area known as the Industrial Zone. GM Korea operated a factory here that assembled the Chevrolet Aveo worldwide and as the Holden Barina in Australia and New Zealand until 2018. Near the port, the Tata Daewoo Commercial Vehicle factory produces Daewoo trucks for the domestic and export markets. In the domestic market vehicles are sold under Daewoo brand; the Tata brand name is used for export due to the dilution of the Daewoo brand.

It is a major port, especially for rice shipments, and is a commercial center for the rice grown in the Geum basin. Rice processing and shipbuilding are important industries, and paper, lumber, rubber, and plastic are also produced. Originally a poor fishing village, Gunsan gained importance with the development of its port, which was opened to foreign trade in 1899. The Japanese, who ruled Korea from 1905 to 1945, further developed the city and port.

Just south of Gunsan is the newly opened Saemangum Seawall, the longest dyke in the world.

== Culture ==
=== Tourist attractions ===
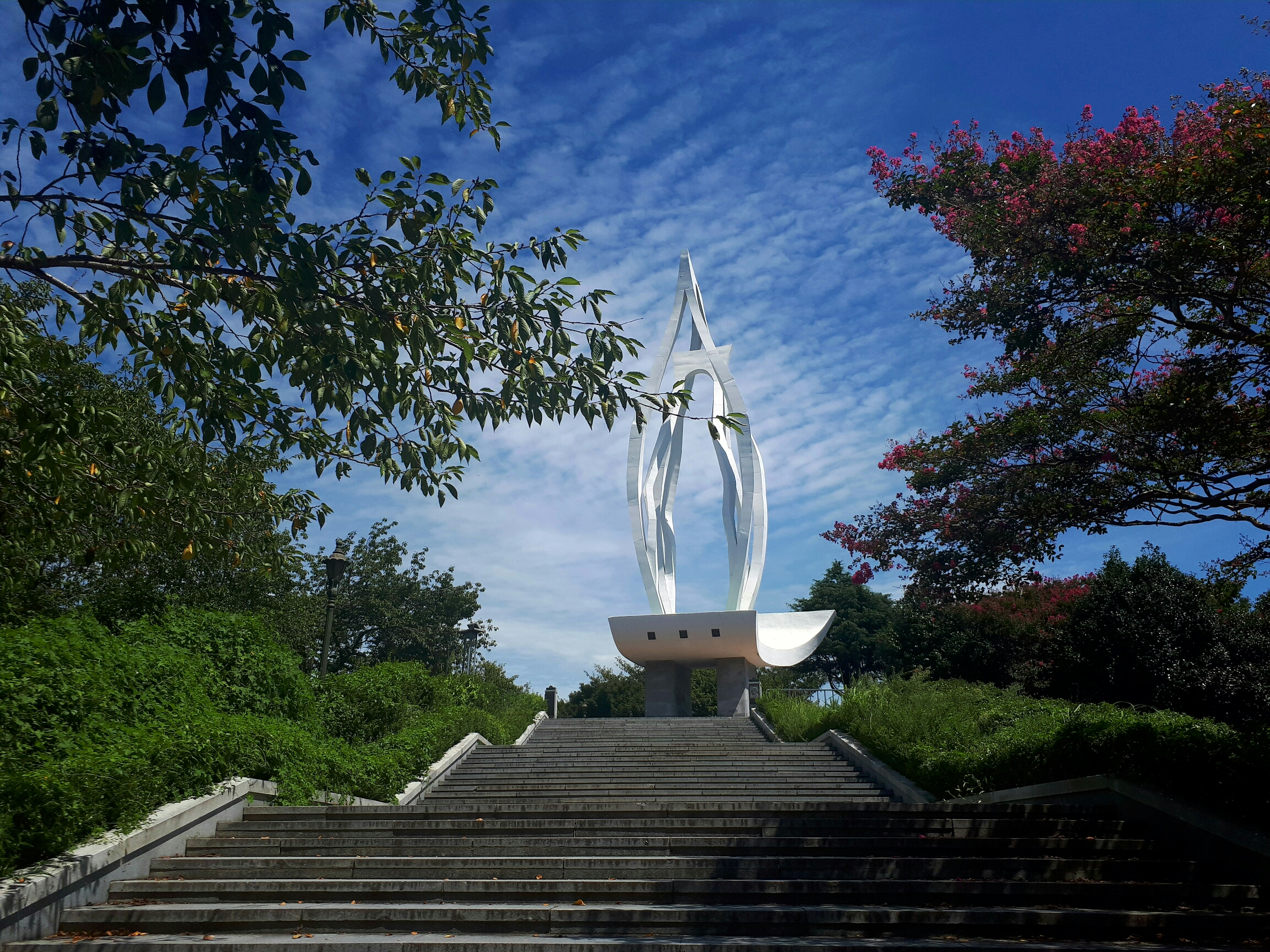
Wolmyeong Park (Susi Tower)

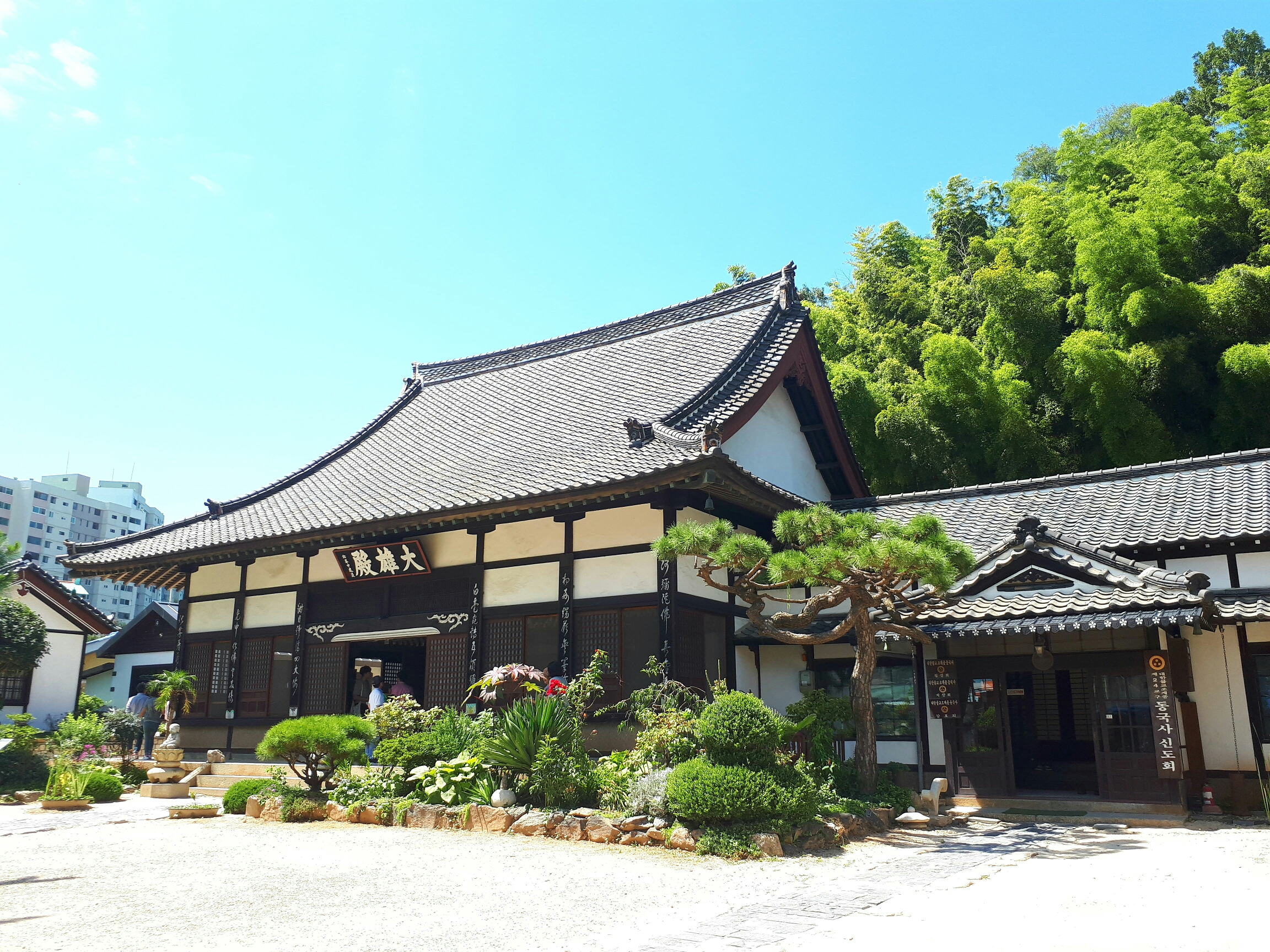
Dongguksa

The Gunsan Islands consist of 16 inhabited islands and 47 uninhabited islands. Gogunsangundo Islands constitutes Shinsido Island, Munyeodo Island, Bangchukdo Island, and Maldo Island, and Seonyudo Island is the center of the islands. A passenger ship to Seonyudo Island operates on average 6-8 times a day.

Eunpa, meaning "Silver Wave" (because of its feature of shining water under sunshine), was originally a reservoir for agriculture but designated as a National Tourist Place in 1985. In spring, a 1-km cherry blossom tunnel is formed from the entrance to the facility compound. In summer, people can enjoy wind surfing and boating in the acacia fragrance. In fall, people can enjoy walking along a promenade stretching from the meeting square at the entrance while picking up chestnuts. It is not only known as a local representation of Gunsan, but also as the nation's tourist place with a mixture of Mulbit (Water and Light) Bridge 370 m long and 3 m wide. A music fountain operates 8 times, 20 minutes per round. It was selected as one of the 100 Big Noted Tourists in Korea in the 'Creating a Good Place to Live' local resources contest.

In 1990, a river mouth bank was constructed at the mouth of Geum Rivers, which was the gateway of Baekje. It is a large migrant bird colony in Korea with reed forests. It is known for migratory birds such as Baikal teals, wild ducks, mallards, wild geese, herring gulls, black head gulls, black head Kentish plovers, etc., and approximately 500,000 winter migrant birds of 40 types visit between mid-October and March. A 360-degree observatory offers views of migrant birds of the Geumgang River area, and the Bird Watching Gallery is a vantage point to view migratory birds.

Wolmyeong Park is in the middle of Gunsan. During spring, colorful cherry blossoms and camellia flowers are in full bloom, while the foliage attracts visitors during fall. On the mountain top, both Geumgang (river) and West sea are visible.

Japanese style houses in Sinheung-Dong are traditional houses of Japanese style, which was constructed by Hiroth, a Japanese fabric dealer of large scale during the colonial era. It has a great architectural value as the roof, finishing touch of outer wall, and inner garden are kept as they were when it was first constructed. It is also a place of filming the movies, such as The Son of the General and Ttajja.

Dongguksa is the only temple left in Korea which was built in Japanese style. Plain eaves and many windows of the outer wall of the main temple are the characteristics of Japanese temples.

Jinpo Marine Park is a theme park that displays retired military equipment (13 types, 16 equipment) of the armed forces, such as Korean naval vessels, at the inner harbor of the historical site of Jinpo battle, recorded to be the first naval battle with guns of warships in the world.

Saemanguem New Year's Festival is hosted on the first day (January 1) of every year at Saemangeum seawall, the longest seawall in the world. Through events, such as sharing rice cake soup, writing new wishes, and releasing balloons of hopes, this day provides an opportunity to plan the new year with family, make wishes, and feel the mystique and deep sensation of nature.

=== Festival ===
- Saemanguem New Year's Festival
- Kunsan Time Travel Festival

=== Museum ===
- Gunsan Modern History Museum

=== Park ===
- Eunpa River Park includes music fountain and bike ways.
- Children's Transportation Park
- Wolmyeong Park

== Climate ==
Gunsan has a humid continental climate (Köppen climate classification Dfa) using the 0 °C isotherm, and a cooler version of a humid subtropical climate (Cfa) using the -3 °C isotherm.

Climate data for Gunsan (1991–2020 normals, extremes 1968–present)
| Month | Jan | Feb | Mar | Apr | May | Jun | Jul | Aug | Sep | Oct | Nov | Dec | Year |
|---|---|---|---|---|---|---|---|---|---|---|---|---|---|
| Record high °C (°F) | 18.1 (64.6) | 20.6 (69.1) | 28.3 (82.9) | 29.7 (85.5) | 31.1 (88.0) | 33.9 (93.0) | 36.9 (98.4) | 37.1 (98.8) | 35.5 (95.9) | 31.0 (87.8) | 25.2 (77.4) | 20.5 (68.9) | 37.1 (98.8) |
| Mean daily maximum °C (°F) | 4.0 (39.2) | 6.0 (42.8) | 10.8 (51.4) | 16.9 (62.4) | 22.3 (72.1) | 26.1 (79.0) | 28.8 (83.8) | 29.9 (85.8) | 26.0 (78.8) | 20.5 (68.9) | 13.4 (56.1) | 6.4 (43.5) | 17.6 (63.7) |
| Daily mean °C (°F) | −0.1 (31.8) | 1.6 (34.9) | 5.8 (42.4) | 11.5 (52.7) | 17.1 (62.8) | 21.6 (70.9) | 25.1 (77.2) | 25.9 (78.6) | 21.5 (70.7) | 15.3 (59.5) | 8.7 (47.7) | 2.2 (36.0) | 13.0 (55.4) |
| Mean daily minimum °C (°F) | −3.8 (25.2) | −2.4 (27.7) | 1.5 (34.7) | 6.9 (44.4) | 12.8 (55.0) | 18.1 (64.6) | 22.3 (72.1) | 22.8 (73.0) | 17.8 (64.0) | 10.9 (51.6) | 4.6 (40.3) | −1.5 (29.3) | 9.2 (48.6) |
| Record low °C (°F) | −16.8 (1.8) | −13.6 (7.5) | −8.5 (16.7) | −1.6 (29.1) | 4.4 (39.9) | 10.8 (51.4) | 14.1 (57.4) | 14.4 (57.9) | 8.3 (46.9) | 0.7 (33.3) | −7.4 (18.7) | −14.5 (5.9) | −16.8 (1.8) |
| Average precipitation mm (inches) | 28.2 (1.11) | 35.9 (1.41) | 44.7 (1.76) | 81.6 (3.21) | 85.8 (3.38) | 142.2 (5.60) | 277.3 (10.92) | 266.5 (10.49) | 137.5 (5.41) | 55.2 (2.17) | 53.9 (2.12) | 37.2 (1.46) | 1,246 (49.06) |
| Average precipitation days (≥ 0.1 mm) | 9.6 | 7.4 | 8.2 | 8.2 | 8.3 | 9.6 | 14.4 | 12.9 | 8.7 | 6.5 | 9.5 | 11.1 | 114.4 |
| Average snowy days | 10.5 | 6.0 | 2.0 | 0.1 | 0.0 | 0.0 | 0.0 | 0.0 | 0.0 | 0.0 | 2.6 | 7.9 | 29.2 |
| Average relative humidity (%) | 71.2 | 69.7 | 70.6 | 71.5 | 75.2 | 80.1 | 85.4 | 83.2 | 79.4 | 74.0 | 72.0 | 71.7 | 75.3 |
| Mean monthly sunshine hours | 159.5 | 172.5 | 203.9 | 215.0 | 225.8 | 187.5 | 152.6 | 188.9 | 189.7 | 207.2 | 163.0 | 151.9 | 2,217.5 |
| Percentage possible sunshine | 48.3 | 54.0 | 51.6 | 53.5 | 49.0 | 40.4 | 33.7 | 43.0 | 50.0 | 55.0 | 48.4 | 48.6 | 47.5 |
Source: Korea Meteorological Administration (snow and percent sunshine 1981–2010)

== Food ==
Gunsan is well known for sliced raw fish, or hoe. In addition to the renowned Gunsan Seafood Hotjip right on the water is the old port area, a new hae center is being constructed to the east of the city, by the Geum River dam/bridge. Gunsan also has a first-class seafood market. Right on the water front, this newer enclosed market has many fresh and frozen fish, crabs and shellfish; salted fish and shrimp and dried fish. On the upper level are a variety of sushi restaurants.

== Education ==
=== Primary and secondary schools ===
There are 154 primary education schools with approximately 39,539 students in attendance. There are a total of four secondary education institutions located in Gunsan.

There are two international schools. One international primary school, the Lighthouse International School and the Overseas Chinese Primary School in Gunsan (群山華僑小學; 군산화교소학교).

Lighthouse International School (LIS) is designed to meet the educational and spiritual needs of the English-speaking business, military, and diplomatic community. The school includes students from several English-speaking nations and ranges from kindergarten to 12th grade. The LIS qualifies for NDSP government funding for command sponsored families.

=== Universities ===
- Kunsan National University
- Howon University
- Sohae College
- Kunsan College of Nursing

== Shopping ==
Gunsan E-mart, the 31st E-mart branch and the third in the Jeonbuk Area, has an area of 16,200 pyong (5.35 ha) and a shopping area of 4,000 pyong (1.32 ha) with parking facilities capable of holding 1,100 vehicles. It is a four-story building (one basement included), which is the biggest E-mart in Korea.

Gunsan Lotte Mart—with a total sales area of 13,686 m^{2}—is the biggest discount shopping mall in Gunsan with an indoor parking lot from the fourth to seventh floor which provides shopping convenience.

Gunsan Oldam Public Market is the first modern mart-like traditional market of Korea, with 90 years of history. There are a lot of foods which are inexpensive, along with a lot of attractions, such as a forge of old days.

== Transportation ==
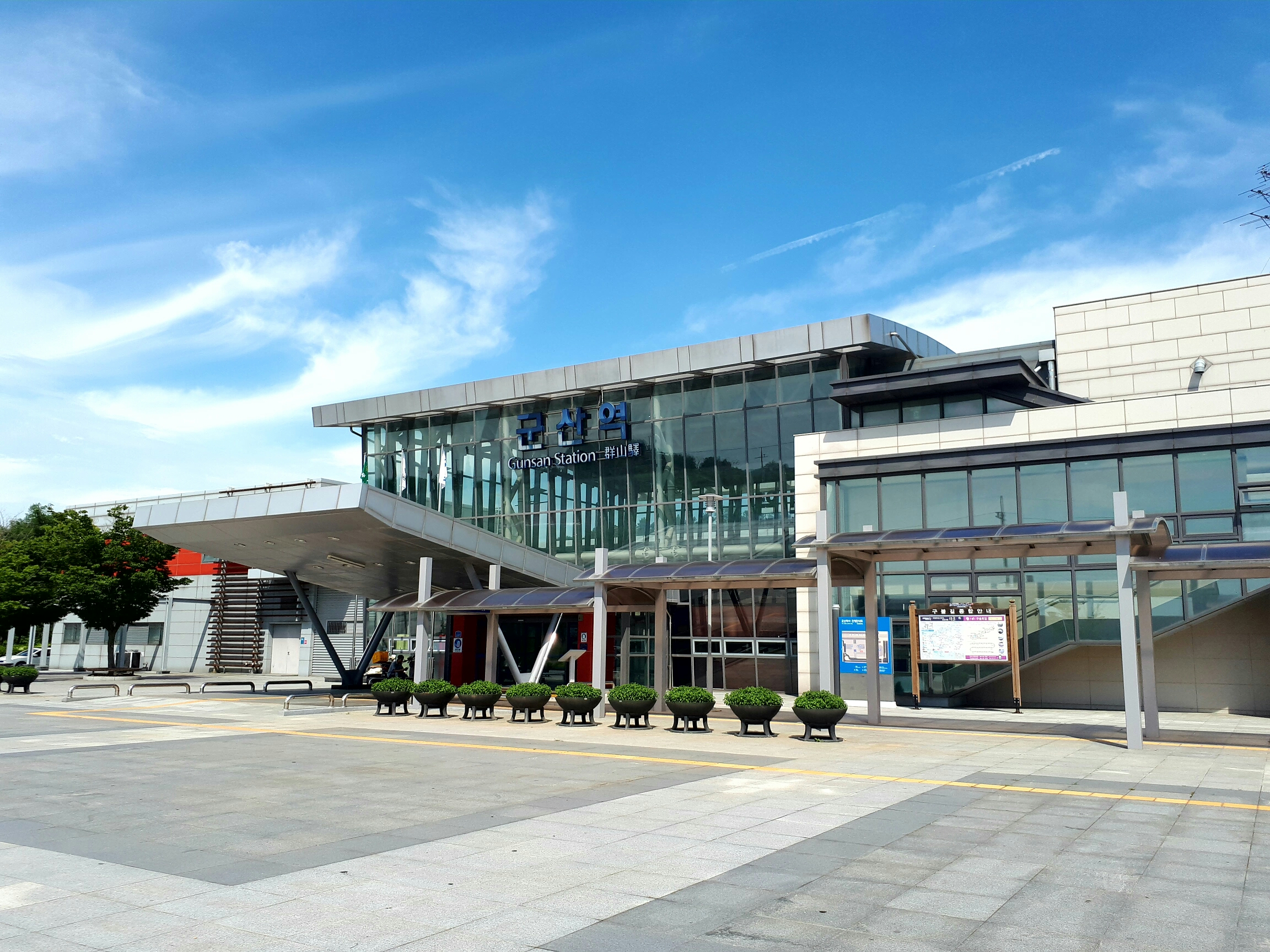
Gunsan Station

The modes of transportation in Gunsan are Intra-City Bus, Inter-City Bus, Express Bus and Railroad. There are roundtrip airplane flights from Gunsan to Jeju Island and passenger liner ferries to Shidao, China.

Gunsan is served by frequent railway service on the Gunsan Line from Iksan. It is connected to the Seohaean Expressway.

=== Port ===
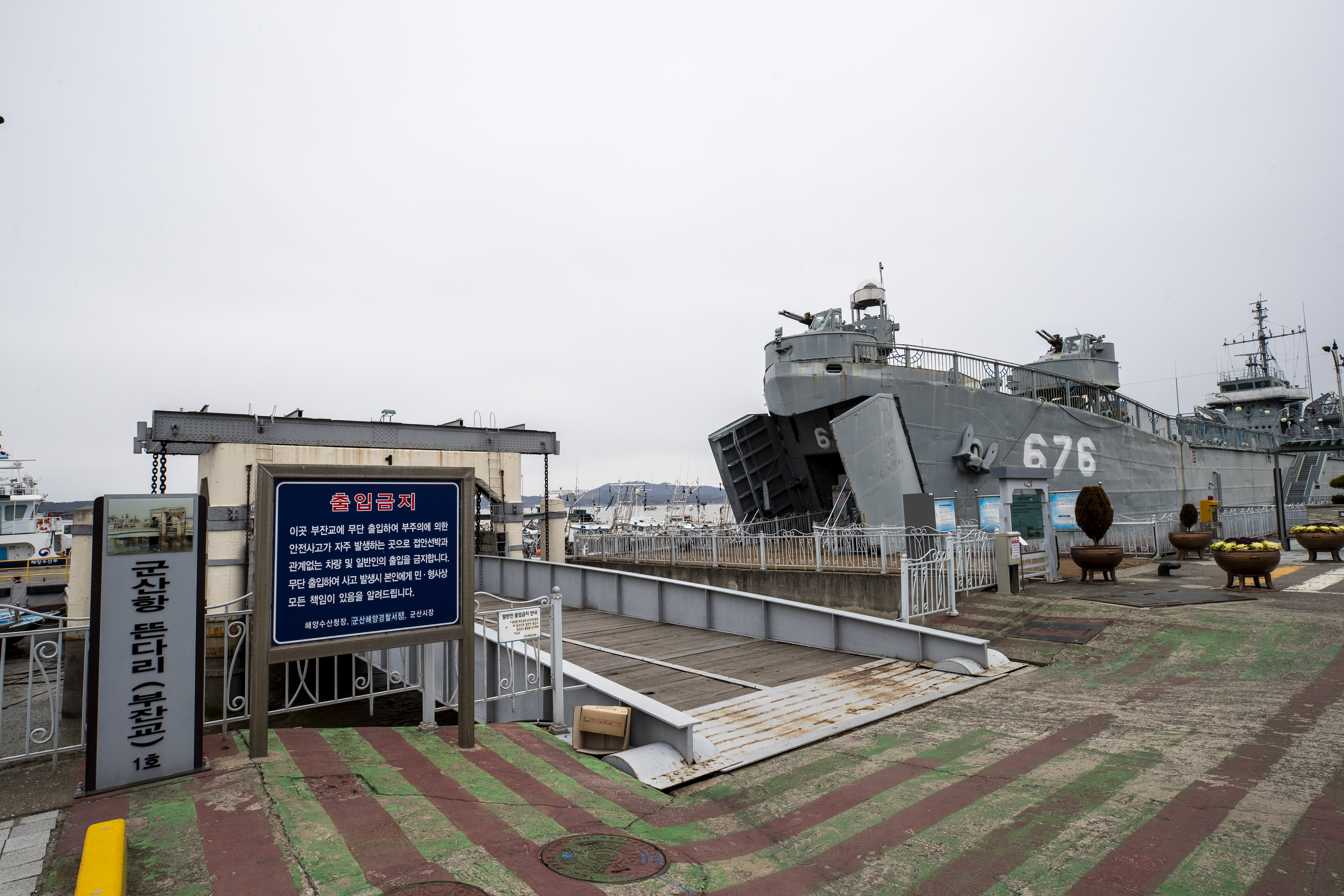
Port of Gunsan

== Island ==
Seonyudo has an area of 2.12 km^{2}, which is only about a quarter of Yeouido in Seoul. The island's coast is about 12.8 km long.

== Twin towns – sister cities ==
Gunsan is twinned with:

- Tacoma, United States (1979)
- Yantai, China (1994)
- Pimpri-Chinchwad (Pune), India (2004)
- Jamshedpur, India (2004)
- Windsor, Canada (2005)

== Notable people from Gunsan ==
- Oh Ji-hwan (오지환), South Korean shortstop, baseball player and player for the LG Twins in the Korea Baseball Organization.
- Lee Seo-won (이서원), South Korean former actor.
- Kim Soo-mi (Real Name: Kim Young-ok, 김영옥), South Korean actress.
- Song Sae-byeok (송새벽), South Korean actor.
- Byung Hun (formerly known as L.Joe, Real Name: Lee Byung-hun, 이병헌), singer, rapper, dancer, actor, model, MC and K-pop idol, former member of K-pop boyband Teen Top.
- Yechan (Real Name: Kim Ye-chan, 김예찬), singer, dancer and K-pop idol, member of K-pop girlgroup PinkFantasy.
- Johyun (Real Name: Shin Ji-won, 신지원), singer, rapper, dancer, actress and K-pop idol, member of K-pop girlgroup Berry Good.
- ChaeA (formerly known as Cherry, Real Name: Kim Chae-young, 김채영), singer, rapper, dancer and K-pop idol, member of K-pop girlgroup REDSQUARE and former member of K-pop girlgroup Good Day
- Catherine Seulki Kang, South Korean-born naturalized Central African taekwondo practitioner, 2012 Olympics
- Lee Jung-hyun (born 1999), basketball player for Goyang Sono Skygunners and the South Korean national team
- Chun In-gee, professional golfer, winner of 3 Women's Majors, The PGA, Evian and US Open.

== See also ==
- List of cities in South Korea
- Geography of South Korea
- Honam

== Sources ==
- Lee Yunho (April 25, 2008), Confirmation of formal designation about Saemangeum-Gunsan free economic zone (in Korean), Jeonbuk provincial office report data
- Changhyo, Y (2015), Growth, decline and the challenges facing a policy-dependent and former-colonial city: Gunsan, Korea, pp. 37–47
- Lee Myeongb_k; Hong Sangtae (2006), A Study on the Construction Plan of the Joint Logistics Center in Gunsan Industrial Complex (in Korean), Korea Logistics Research Association Inc., pp. 103–125
- Gunsan City website (in Korean)
- Gunsan City (2008), Visit Gunsan 2008, tourism guide for Gunsan city (in Korean)
- Yu Heeyeol (January 18, 2008), A proposal for improving Gunsan port (in Korean), Gunsan Mirae
- Yeo Gitae (2002), A Study on Strategy for Development of Kunsan and Janghang Port (in Korean), Korea Academy of International Commerce, pp. 209–232
- "Integrated preservation study on the oceanic environments in the Saemangeum area" (in Korean). 2007.
- Go Seokjung (November 23, 2007), Creating a Good Place to Live, Local Resources Contest (in Korean), Newsis
- Gunsan passenger ship terminal (in Korean)
