= Saemangeum Seawall =

World's longest man-made dyke

Coordinates: 35.820222°N 126.482758°E

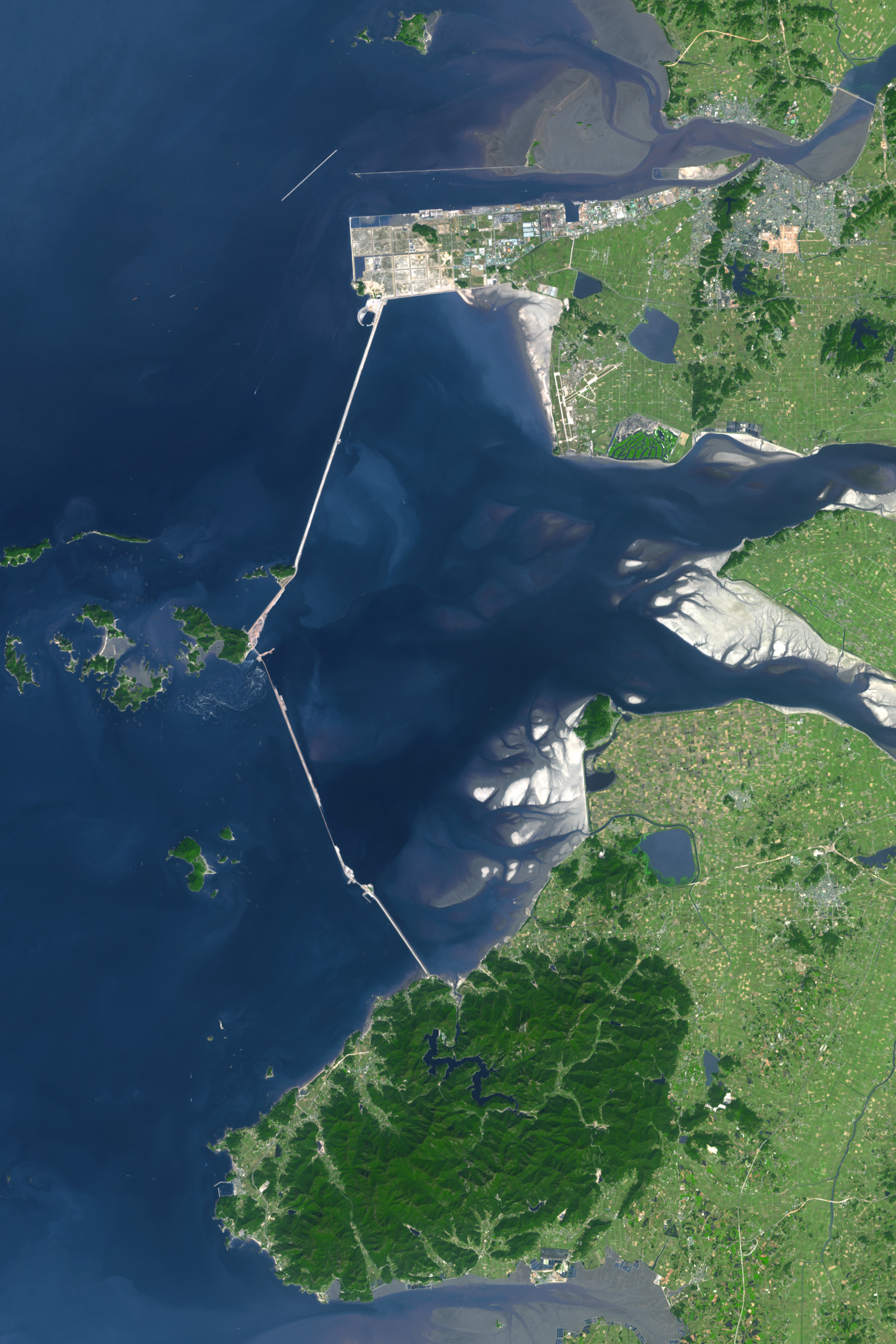
- Picture taken by NASA in October 2006. The city at the top of the picture is Gunsan and the below is Buan County.

Korean name
- Hangul: 새만금 방조제
- Hanja: 새萬金防潮堤
- RR: Saemangeum bangjoje
- MR: Saeman'gŭm pangjoje

The Saemangeum Seawall (Korean: 새만금 방조제), on the south-west coast of the Korean Peninsula, is the world's longest man-made dyke, measuring 33 kilometres (21 mi). It runs between two headlands, and separates the Yellow Sea and the former Saemangeum estuary.

It was built to reclaim land for both agriculture and urban uses, including industrial uses, and 401 km^{2} of the estuary was planned to be developed into an artificial lake (118 km^{2}) and reclaimed land (283 km^{2} ) that would provide nearly 10% of South Korea's total rice production.

It is said to be the world's largest wetland reclamation, and the various controversies, court cases and commissions led in part to the Wetland Conservation Act of 1999 (amended 2014), which should both prevent the future loss of wetlands and help with wetland restoration.

== History ==
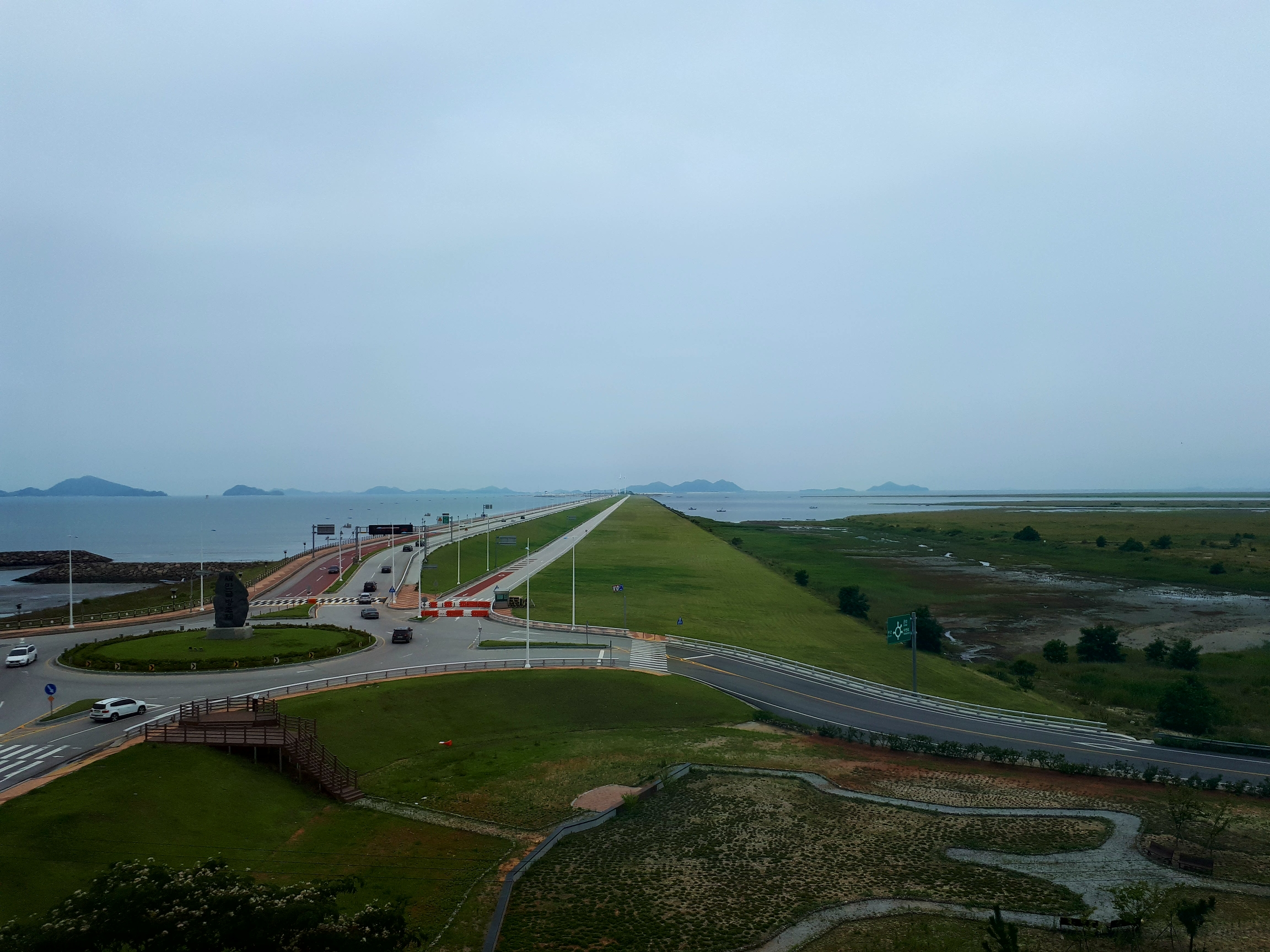
A view of the Saemangeum Seawall.

In 1991 the South Korean government announced that a dyke would be constructed to link three headlands just south of the South Korean industrial port city of Gunsan, 270 kilometres (168 mi) south-west of Seoul, to create 400 square kilometres (150 mi^{2}) of farmland and a freshwater reservoir. Since then the government has spent nearly 2 trillion won (1.75 billion USD) on construction of the dyke, with another 220 billion won (192.32 million USD) budgeted on strengthening the dyke and a further 1.31 trillion won (1.15 billion USD) to transform the tidal flats into arable land and the reservoir. The average width of the sea wall/earth dam is 290 metres (950 ft). It is 535 metres (1,755 ft) at its widest, the average height is 36 metres (118 ft) and it is 54 metres (177 ft) at its highest.

The construction of the Saemangeum Seawall caused controversy from the moment it was announced as environmental groups protested against the impact of the dyke on the local environment. Supreme Court challenges in 1999 and 2005 led to temporary production stoppages but ultimately failed to stop the project. Major construction was completed in April 2006, with the seawall 500 metres (1,600 ft) longer than the Afsluitdijk in the IJsselmeer, the Netherlands, previously the longest seawall-dyke in the world.

With remaining minor construction and inspection finished, the seawall was officially opened to the public on 27 April 2010. Then South Korean president Lee Myung Bak commented that Saemangeum would be "the kernel and the gateway of South Korea's west coast industrial belt" and was "another effort by us for low-carbon and green growth, along with the four-rivers project". A ceremony was held in Saemangeum the same day, with cabinet officials, politicians and delegates from other countries.

As of 2019 a floating solar PV plant of 2.1 GW capacity was planned using the coastal reservoir area of the Saemangeum Seawall.

== Composition ==
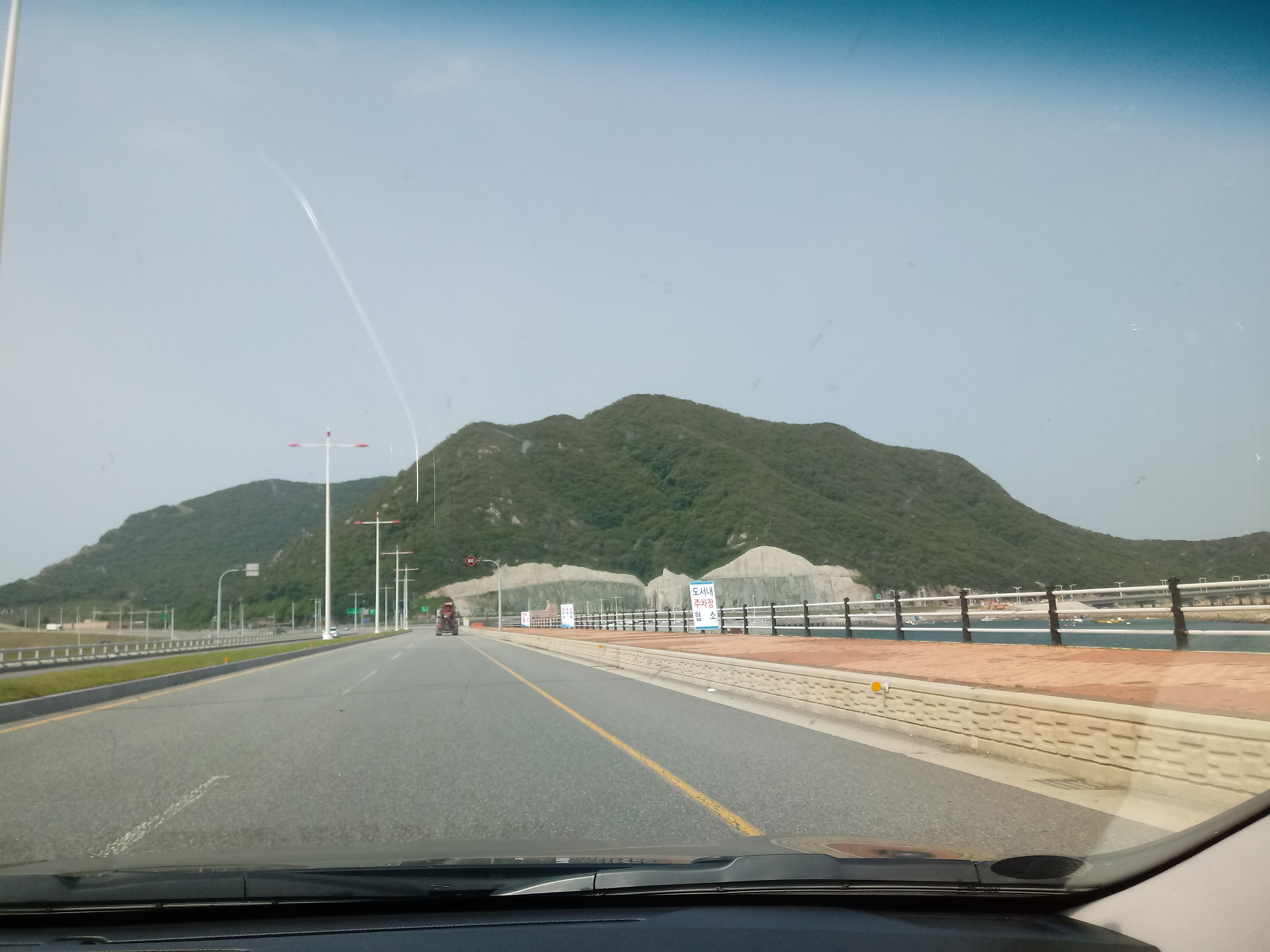
3rd section of the seawall

4th section of the seawall on Gunsan-bound

The road on Saemangeum Seawall, with a length of 33 km, connects Buan County to Gunsan and is a part of National Route 77.

IS: Intersection, IC: Interchange

Name	Hangul name	Connection	Location		Note
Saemangeum IS	새만금 교차로	National Route 30 (Byeonsan-ro)	Buan County	Byeonsan-myeon	
Saemangeum Seawall (1st section)	새만금 방조제 (1호)		Buan County	Byeonsan-myeon	4.7 km long
Garyeok-do Park (Garyeok Service Area)	가력도공원 (가력휴게소)	가력도공원 (가력휴게소)	Buan County	Byeonsan-myeon	
Garyeok Drain Gate	가력배수갑문		Buan County	Byeonsan-myeon	
Saemangeum Seawall (2nd section)	새만금 방조제 (2호)		Gimje	Jinbong-myeon	9.9 km long
Sinsi Drain Gate	신시배수갑문		Gunsan	Okdo-myeon	
Sinsi Tunnel	신시터널		Gunsan	Okdo-myeon	Approximately 70m
Sinsi 1 IS	신시1교차로	National Route 4 (Gogunsan-ro)	Gunsan	Okdo-myeon	National Route 4 overlap
Saemangeum Seawall (3rd section)	새만금 방조제 (3호)		Gunsan	Okdo-myeon	National Route 4 overlap 2.7 km long
Yami-do	야미도		Gunsan	Okdo-myeon	National Route 4 overlap 11.4 km long
Saemangeum Seawall (4th section)	새만금 방조제 (4호)		Gunsan	Okdo-myeon	National Route 4 overlap 11.4 km long
Saemangeum Seawall (4th section)			Gunsan	Soryong-dong	National Route 4 overlap 11.4 km long
Sinsi-do Entrance IS	신시도입구삼거리	Bieung-ro, Saemangeumbuk-ro	Gunsan	Soryong-dong	National Route 4 overlap 11.4 km long

== Environmental impact ==
The enclosure of the estuary and its bay by the dyke has had major environmental impacts. It has destroyed 401 square kilometres of mudflats, which many thousands of migratory shore birds using the East Asian-Australasian Flyway once used as a stopover site before continuing their migration south to Australasia, and thus is a factor in the major decline of birds such as the Far Eastern Curlew.

The dyke has changed both the estuarine tidal system inside the dyke and the coastal marine environment outside the dyke. Following completion of the dyke, red tides, hypoxia and coastal erosion/deposition have occurred successively. Red tides occur almost year round inside the dyke, and even when the sluice gates are fully open the water quality does not improve much owing to the loss of hydrodynamic stirring power.

A study of benthic communities enclosed by the dyke and the environmental factors determining them (where the abundance and biomass of various species of intertidal fauna were measured in 2005) aimed at giving baseline data on the "distribution of benthic macrofauna for future monitoring" and at "identifying the relative importance of environmental variables that explain faunal zonation". This study also hoped to give a basis for wetland restoration. Later studies have documented environmental changes together with benthic faunal changes and concluded that tidal damping has greatly decreased benthic fauna species number and density, that the halophyte community has been greatly affected, that the shellfish catch has been reduced and that there have been increases in organophosphorus and organochloride pesticides in both seawater and sediments, changes in shorebird populations and massive erosion near the dyke openings.

The Saemangeum project is considered to be perhaps the worst example of a massive tidal land reclamation project, which "inevitably destroys the natural and productive ecosystem of tidal flats".

== In culture ==
Decades-long struggle of citizens against the project is portrayed by Hwang Yin in her 2022 documentary Sura: a Love Song.

== See also ==
- Saemangeum
- Sihwa Lake Tidal Power Station
- Environment of South Korea
- The Four Major Rivers Restoration Project
- Kalpasar Project
