= Byeon Chang-heum =

South Korean educator turned government official

- 변창흠 卞彰欽
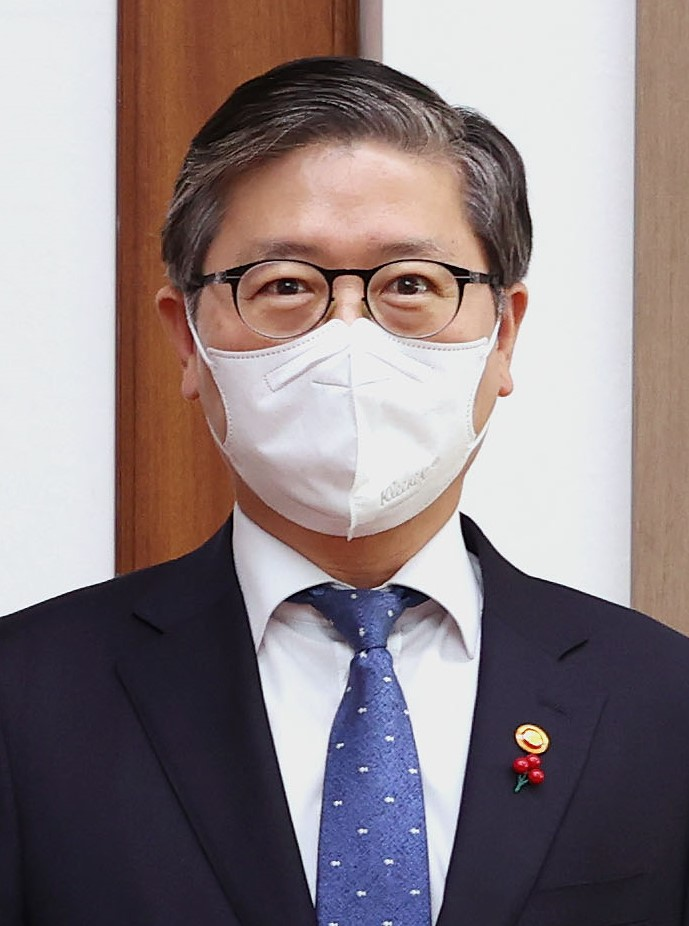

Minister of Land, Infrastructure and Transport
- In office 29 December 2020 – 16 April 2021
- President: Moon Jae-in
- Preceded by: Kim Hyun-mee
- Succeeded by: Yoon Sung-won (acting); Noh Hyeong-ouk

CEO of the Korea Land and Housing Corporation
- In office 29 April 2019 – 14 December 2020
- Preceded by: Park Sang-woo
- Succeeded by: Jang Choong-mo (acting)

Personal details
- Born: 14 August 1964 (age 62) Uiseong, North Gyeongsang, South Korea
- Party: Independent
- Education: Seoul National University
- Occupation: Educator

Byeon Chang-heum (Korean: 변창흠; Hanja: 卞彰欽; born 14 August 1964) is a South Korean educator who served as the chief executive officer (CEO) of the Korea Land and Housing Corporation from 2019 to 2020 and as the minister of land, infrastructure and transport from 2020 to 2021.

== Career ==
=== Early career ===
Byeon was a lecturer at Chungbuk National University, Kangnam University, Yonsei University and Seoul National University. He was the senior researcher at Seoul City Development Corporation (later Seoul Housing and Communities Corporation) from 1996 to 1999, and became a Professor of Public Administration at Sejong University in 2003. In 2014 he was the head of the Korea Centre for City and Environment Research.

In November 2014 Byeon was appointed the CEO of the SH Corporation, under the then Mayor of Seoul Park Won-soon. The appointment gained public attention, as he was the first scholar to hold the position. Under his tenure the corporation changed its name to Seoul Housing and Communities Corporation in 2016. He resigned in November 2017 due to a blacklist controversy.

His tenure as the chief executive officer (CEO) of the Korea Land and Housing Corporation began on 29 April 2019. He backed and fulfilled the housing policies of the Moon Jae-in government. When he attended the Land, Infrastructure and Transport Committee of the National Assembly on 3 August 2020, he was asked by the Icheon MP Song Seog-jun about (among Lee Myung-bak, Park Geun-hye and Moon Jae-in) which government's real estate policy was the best. Byeon replied that Moon's policy is the best.

On 4 December 2020, he was nominated the new Minister of Land, Infrastructure and Transport, replacing the incumbent Kim Hyun-mee. As he became a minister-nominee, he resigned as the CEO of the Korea Land and Housing Corporation on 14 December. Several netizens denounced his appointment as "similar" or "spicier" than the incumbent.

On 12 March 2021, Byeon offered to tender his resignation to the President Moon Jae-in. He left office on 16 April. His term was 109 days, making him the shortest-serving Minister of Land, Infrastructure and Transport.

== Controversies ==
On 18 December 2020, the office of Park Seong-min, a People Power MP, said that Byeon had made a defamatory remark against share house residents while he was the CEO of the SH Corporation on 30 June 2016. The remark was "Those poor people should cook at their home, not buying outside foods. It's absolutely crazy."; where the "poor people" refers to "share house residents". A day before, Park's office had said that Byeon had made another remark against a victim of Guui station incident; saying "It was just nothing. The victim had to be careful."

== Personal life and education ==
After the graduation from Neungin High School, Byeon attended Seoul National University, where he obtained a bachelor's degree in economics, a master's degree in urban planning and a doctorate in public administration.

In 1992, he married Park Jong-hyo, a professor at Konkuk University. They have two daughters — Byeon Ye-seul and Byeon Hyun-jung.

He is a Buddhist.
