= Kim Jin-suk =

Kim Jin-suk may refer to:

- Kim Jin-suk (swimmer)
- Kim Jin-suk (activist)
- Kim Jinsook, South Korean bureaucrat
