= Noh Hyeong-ouk =

South Korean politician (born 1962)

- 노형욱
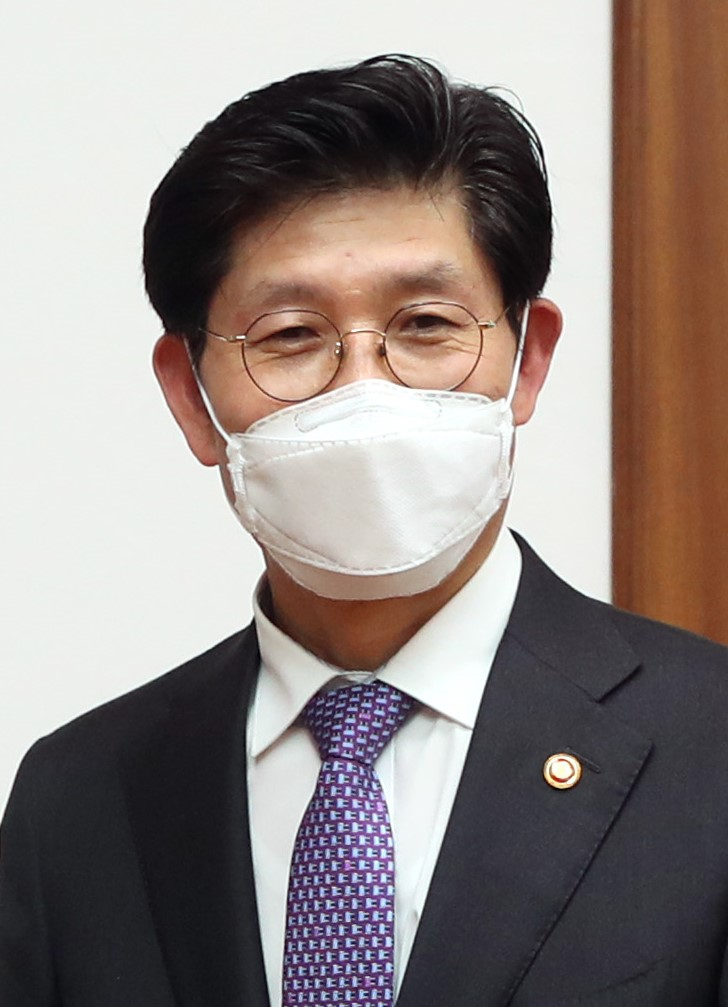

Minister of Land, Infrastructure and Transport
- In office 14 May 2021 – 13 May 2022
- President: Moon Jae-in
- Preceded by: Byeon Chang-heum; Yoon Sung-won (acting)
- Succeeded by: Won Hee-ryong

Minister for Government Policy Coordination
- In office 9 November 2018 – 8 May 2020
- President: Moon Jae-in
- Preceded by: Hong Nam-ki
- Succeeded by: Koo Yun-cheol

2nd Deputy Minister for Government Policy Coordination
- In office 25 August 2016 – 9 November 2018
- President: Park Geun-hye; Moon Jae-in
- Minister: Lee Seok-jun; Hong Nam-ki
- Preceded by: Cho Kyung-kyu
- Succeeded by: Cha Young-hwan

Personal details
- Born: 1962 (age 63–64) Sunchang County, North Jeolla, South Korea
- Party: Independent
- Education: Yonsei University; Seoul National University; Sciences Po
- Occupation: Activist, government official

Noh Hyeong-ouk (Korean: 노형욱, born 1962) is a South Korean activist and government official who served as the minister of land, infrastructure and transport from 2021 to 2022. He previously served as the Minister for Government Policy Coordination from 2018 to 2020, and the 2nd Deputy Minister from 2016 to 2018.

== Education and early career ==
Born in Sunchang, North Jeolla, Noh attended Gwangju Jeil High School and studied political diplomacy at Yonsei University. He also obtained 2 master's degrees; one in public administration from Seoul National University while another one in international economics at Sciences Po.

He is a colleague to Kim Hyun-mee, the former and the first Minister of Land, Infrastructure and Transport under the President Moon Jae-in. Both used to be involved in student movements during the university life. He is also a junior to the former Prime Minister Lee Nak-yon.

== Career ==
After qualifying for the Public Administration Examination in 1986, Noh has been working at the Ministry of Economy and Finance (formerly the Ministry of Planning and Budget), where he served various positions, including the Head of the Welfare, Labour and Budget.

In 2009, he served as the Director General for Policy Planning of the Ministry of Health and Welfare. He strengthened the social safety net that was influenced by the 2008 financial crisis.

In August 2016, Noh became the 2nd Deputy Minister for Government Policy Coordination under the then President Park Geun-hye. After Moon Jae-in was elected the new president in 2017, he remained the position until he was promoted as the Minister in 2018. He was replaced by Koo Yun-cheol in 2020.

On 16 April 2021, Noh was nominated the new Minister of Land, Infrastructure and Transport, replacing the controversial incumbent Byeon Chang-heum. He was officially appointed on 14 May.
