= Kim Jinsook =

South Korean bureaucrat

- 김진숙

Administrator of National Agency for Administrative City Construction
- In office 14 December 2018 – 24 February 2020
- President: Moon Jae-in
- Minister: Kim Hyun-mee
- Preceded by: Lee Won-jae
- Succeeded by: Lee Moon-gi

President of Korea Expressway Corporation
- Incumbent
- Assumed office 10 April 2020
- Preceded by: Lee Gang-rae; Jin Gyu-dong (acting)

Personal details
- Born: 1960 (age 65–66) Incheon, South Korea
- Education: Inha University; University of Wisconsin–Madison

Kim Jinsook (Korean: 김진숙; Hanja: 金珍淑; born 1960) is a South Korean bureaucrat currently serving as the President of Korea Expressway Corporation and previously served as the Administrator of National Agency for Administrative City Construction under President Moon Jae-in. She is the first woman to lead the Agency since it was first founded in 2006, assume a vice-ministerial-level post at Ministry of Land, Infrastructure and Transport and govern Korea Expressway Corporation respectively.

Kim first entered into public service in 1988 through the technology exam and held various positions - mostly in relations to construction - at now-Ministry of Land, Infrastructure and Transport. Before appointed to the Administrator, she served as the Vice Administrator of the Agency from September 2017.

Kim holds Bachelor of Architecture from Inha University and master's degree in Urban and Regional Planning from University of Wisconsin–Madison.

== Honours ==
- Order of Service Merit by the government of South Korea (2004)
