= Kim Hyun-sook (academic) =

South Korean professor of urban engineering

- 김현숙

Administrator of Saemangeum Development and Investment Agency
- In office 19 February 2019 – 13 August 2020
- President: Moon Jae-in
- Minister: Kim Hyun-mee
- Preceded by: Lee Cheol-woo
- Succeeded by: Yang Choon-mo

Personal details
- Born: 1960 (age 65–66) Gunsan, South Korea
- Education: Chonbuk National University; Waseda University

Kim Hyun-sook (Korean: 김현숙; born 1960) is a South Korean professor of urban engineering at Chonbuk National University previously served as the Administrator of Saemangeum Development and Investment Agency under President Moon Jae-in from February 2019 to August 2020. She is the first woman and non-government official to assume the post since its creation in 2013.

Kim previously participated in numerous government committees. She has served as a member of Presidential Commission on Architectural Policy from 2011 to 2013, National Land Policy Committee under Prime Minister's Office from 2012 to 2018, Free Economic Zone Committee from 2015 to 2019 and now-Presidential Committee for Balanced National Development from 2015 to 2017. In addition, she was a member of Saemangeum Committee from 2017 to 2019.

She holds three degrees in engineering: bachelor in architectural engineering from Chonbuk National University and master's and doctorate in civil engineering from Waseda University.
