= Government of South Korea =

Government of the Republic of Korea
- 대한민국 정부
- Emblem of the (Executive) Government of South Korea
- Formation: 11 April 1919; 107 years ago (Provisional Government of the Republic of Korea); 15 August 1948; 78 years ago (First Republic); 25 February 1988; 38 years ago (current form)
- Jurisdiction: South Korea
- Website: www.gov.kr

Legislative branch
- Legislature: National Assembly
- Meeting place: National Assembly Building

Executive branch
- Leader: President
- Headquarters: Cheong Wa Dae, Seoul
- Main organ: State Council
- Departments: 19

Judicial branch
- Court: Supreme Court
- Seat: Seocho District, Seoul
- Court: Constitutional Court
- Seat: Jongno District, Seoul

- Government of the Republic of Korea
- Hangul: 대한민국 정부
- Hanja: 大韓民國政府
- RR: Daehanminguk jeongbu
- MR: Taehanmin'guk chŏngbu

The government of South Korea is the national government of the Republic of Korea, created by the Constitution of South Korea as the executive, legislative and judicial authority of the republic. The president acts as the head of state and is the highest figure of executive authority in the country, followed by the prime minister and government ministers in decreasing order.

The Executive and Legislative branches operate primarily at the national level, although various ministries in the executive branch also carry out local functions. Local governments are semi-autonomous and contain executive and legislative bodies of their own. The judicial branch operates at both the national and local levels. The South Korean government's structure is determined by the Constitution of the Republic of Korea. This document has been revised several times since its first promulgation in 1948 (for details, see History of South Korea). However, it has retained many broad characteristics; with the exception of the short-lived Second Republic of South Korea, the country has always had a relatively independent chief executive in the form of a president.

As with most other presidential systems, a system of checks and balances is in place. For instance, the judges of the Constitutional Court are partially appointed by the executive, and partially by the legislature. Likewise, when a resolution of impeachment is passed by the legislature, it is sent to the judiciary for a final decision.

== Legislative branch ==
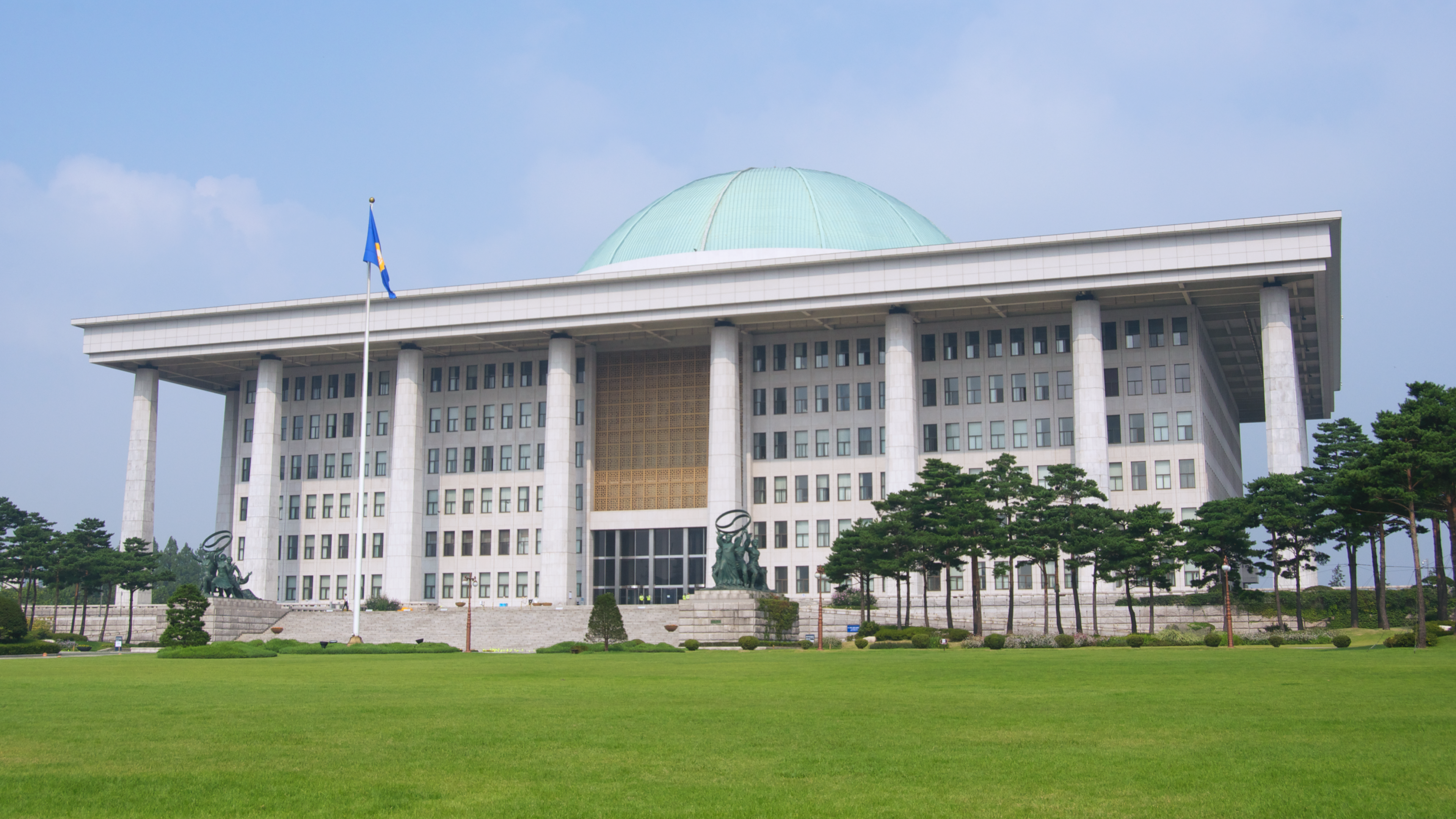
The National Assembly building

The main chamber of the National Assembly

Separation of powers and election system in South Korea

At the national level, the legislative branch consists of the National Assembly of South Korea. This is a unicameral legislature; it consists of a single large assembly. Most of its 300 members are elected from-member constituencies; however, 56 are elected through proportional representation. The members of the National Assembly serve for four years; if a member is unable to complete his or her term, a by-election is held. The National Assembly is charged with deliberating and passing legislation, auditing the budget and administrative procedures, ratifying treaties, and approving state appointments. In addition, it has the power to impeach or recommend the removal of high officials.

The Assembly forms 17 standing committees to deliberate matters of detailed policy. For the most part, these coincide with the ministries of the executive branch.

Bills pass through these committees before they reach the floor. However, before they reach committee, they must already have gained the support of at least 20 members, unless they have been introduced by the president. To secure final passage, a bill must be approved by a majority of those present; a tie vote defeats the bill. After passage, bills are sent to the president for approval; they must be approved within 15 days.

Each year, the budget bill is submitted to the National Assembly by the executive. By law, it must be submitted at least 90 days before the start of the fiscal year, and the final version must be approved at least 30 days before the start of the fiscal year. The Assembly is also responsible for auditing accounts of past expenditures, which must be submitted at least 120 days before the start of the fiscal year.

Sessions of the Assembly may be either regular (once a year, for no more than 100 days) or extraordinary (by request of the president or a caucus, no more than 30 days). These sessions are open-door by default but can be closed to the public by majority vote or by decree of the Speaker. In order for laws to be passed in any session, a quorum of half the members must be present.

Since September 2024 and at least until October 2025, seven political parties are represented in the National Assembly.

== Executive branch ==
The executive branch is headed by the president. The president is elected directly by the people, and is the only elected member of the national executive. The president serves for one five-year term; additional terms are not permitted. The President serves a fixed term regardless of the confidence of the National Assembly. However, the President may be impeached by the National Assembly for violating the Constitution or the law, and this provision also applies to the Prime Minister, Ministers, heads of executive ministries, Justices of the Constitutional Court, judges, members of the National Election Commission, the Chairperson and members of the Board of Audit and Inspection, and other public officials as prescribed by law. Once the National Assembly votes in favor of the impeachment the Constitutional Court should either confirm or reject the impeachment resolution, once again reflecting the system of checks and balances between the three branches of the government.

The president is head of state, head of government and commander-in-chief of the South Korean armed forces. The president is vested with the power to declare war, and can also propose legislation to the National Assembly. The president can also declare a state of emergency or martial law, subject to the Assembly's subsequent approval. Under the principle of separation of powers, the President may exercise the right to veto a bill as a means of checking the legislature. However, if the National Assembly passes the bill again with the attendance of a majority of its members and the approval of two-thirds of those present, the bill becomes law. The current Constitution does not grant the President the power to dissolve the National Assembly. This safeguard reflects the experience of authoritarian governments under the First, Third, and Fourth Republics. In particular, during the Fourth Republic, the power to dissolve the National Assembly was explicitly granted to the president for the first time in the nation’s constitutional history. On October 17, 1972, President Park Chung-hee issued a “Special Declaration” announcing the Yushin (“Revitalizing Reform”), through which he dissolved the National Assembly and suspended the Constitution.

The Yushin Constitution formally adopted a presidential system. However, by granting the president the authority to dissolve the National Assembly—an authority not normally found in presidential systems—it introduced certain elements of a parliamentary system. This provision allowed the president to exercise considerable control over the legislature, expanding the power of the executive branch. Article 59 of the Yushin Constitution stated that “the President may dissolve the National Assembly,” but it did not specify any conditions, procedures, or limits on the president’s responsibility when exercising this power. Since the Constitution at the time did not grant the National Assembly a vote of no confidence in the government, the dissolution power functioned as a unilateral presidential prerogative. This power to dissolve the legislature was maintained under the Constitution of the Fifth Republic. However, following the June Democratic Uprising in 1987 and the subsequent constitutional amendment, the president’s authority to dissolve the National Assembly was removed, restoring the system of checks and balances between the executive and legislative branches.

The president is assisted in his or her duties by the Prime Minister of South Korea as well as the Presidential Secretariat. The Prime Minister is appointed by the president upon the approval of the National Assembly, and has the power to recommend the appointment or dismissal of the Cabinet ministers. The officeholder is not required to be a member of the National Assembly. The Prime Minister is assisted in his/her duties by the Prime Minister's Office which houses both the Office for Government Policy Coordination and the Prime Minister's Secretariat (국무총리비서실; 國務總理祕書室), the former of which is headed by a cabinet-level minister and the latter by a vice minister-level chief of staff. if the president is unable to fulfill his duties, the Prime Minister assumes the president's powers and takes control of the state until the President can once again fulfill his/her duties or until a new president is elected.

The State Council is the highest body and national cabinet for policy deliberation and resolution in the executive branch of the Republic of Korea. The Constitution of the Republic of Korea mandates that the Cabinet be composed of between 15 and 30 members including the Chairperson, and currently the Cabinet includes the President, the Prime Minister, the Vice Prime Minister (the Minister of Strategy and Finance), and the cabinet-level ministers of the 17 ministries. The Constitution designates the President as the chairperson of the Cabinet and the Prime Minister as the vice chairperson. Nevertheless, the Prime Minister frequently holds the meetings without the presence of the President as the meeting can be lawfully held as long as the majority of the Cabinet members are present at the meeting. Also, as many government agencies have moved out of Seoul into other parts of the country since 2013, the need to hold Cabinet meetings without having to convene in one place at the same time has been growing, and therefore the law has been amended to allow Cabinet meetings in a visual teleconference format. Although not the official members of the Cabinet, the chief presidential secretary (대통령비서실장; 大統領祕書室長), the Minister of the Office for Government Policy Coordination (국무조정실장; 國務調整室長), the Minister of Government Legislation (법제처장; 法制處長), the Minister of Food and Drug Safety (식품의약품안전처장; 食品醫藥品安全處長), the Chairperson of Korea Fair Trade Commission (공정거래위원장; 公正去來委員長), the Chairperson of Financial Services Commission (금융위원장; 金融委員長), the Mayor of Seoul, and other officials designated by law or deemed necessary by the Chairperson of the Cabinet can also attend the Cabinet meetings and speak in front of the Cabinet without the right to vote on the matters discussed in the meetings The Mayor of Seoul, although being the head of a local autonomous region in South Korea and not directly related to the central executive branch, has been allowed to attend the Cabinet meeting considering the special status of Seoul (Special City) and its mayor (the only cabinet-level mayor in Korea).

The Cabinet of the Republic of Korea performs somewhat different roles than those of many other nations with similar forms. As the Korean political system is basically a presidential system yet with certain aspects of parliamentary cabinet system combined, the Cabinet of the Republic of Korea also is a combination of both systems. More specifically, the Korean Cabinet performs policy resolutions as well as policy consultations to the President. Reflecting that the Republic of Korea is basically a presidential republic the Cabinet resolutions cannot bind the president's decision, and in this regard, the Korean Cabinet is similar to those advisory counsels in strict presidential republics. At the same time, however, the Constitution of the Republic of Korea specifies in details 17 categories including budgetary and military matters, which necessitates the resolution of the Cabinet in addition to the President's approval, and in this regard the Korean Cabinet is similar to those cabinets in strict parliamentary cabinet systems.

The official residence and office of the President of the Republic of Korea is the Yongsan Presidential Office in Seoul, occupying the building formerly known as the Ministry of National Defense Building. In addition to the Office of the President, the Yongsan Presidential Office building also houses the Office of National Security and the Presidential Security Service to assist the President.

Formerly, the Blue House or "Cheongwadae" in Jongno District was the official residence and office of the President as well as other related agencies, until their transfer to Yongsan in 2022 during the term of President Yoon Suk-Yeol.

=== Ministries ===
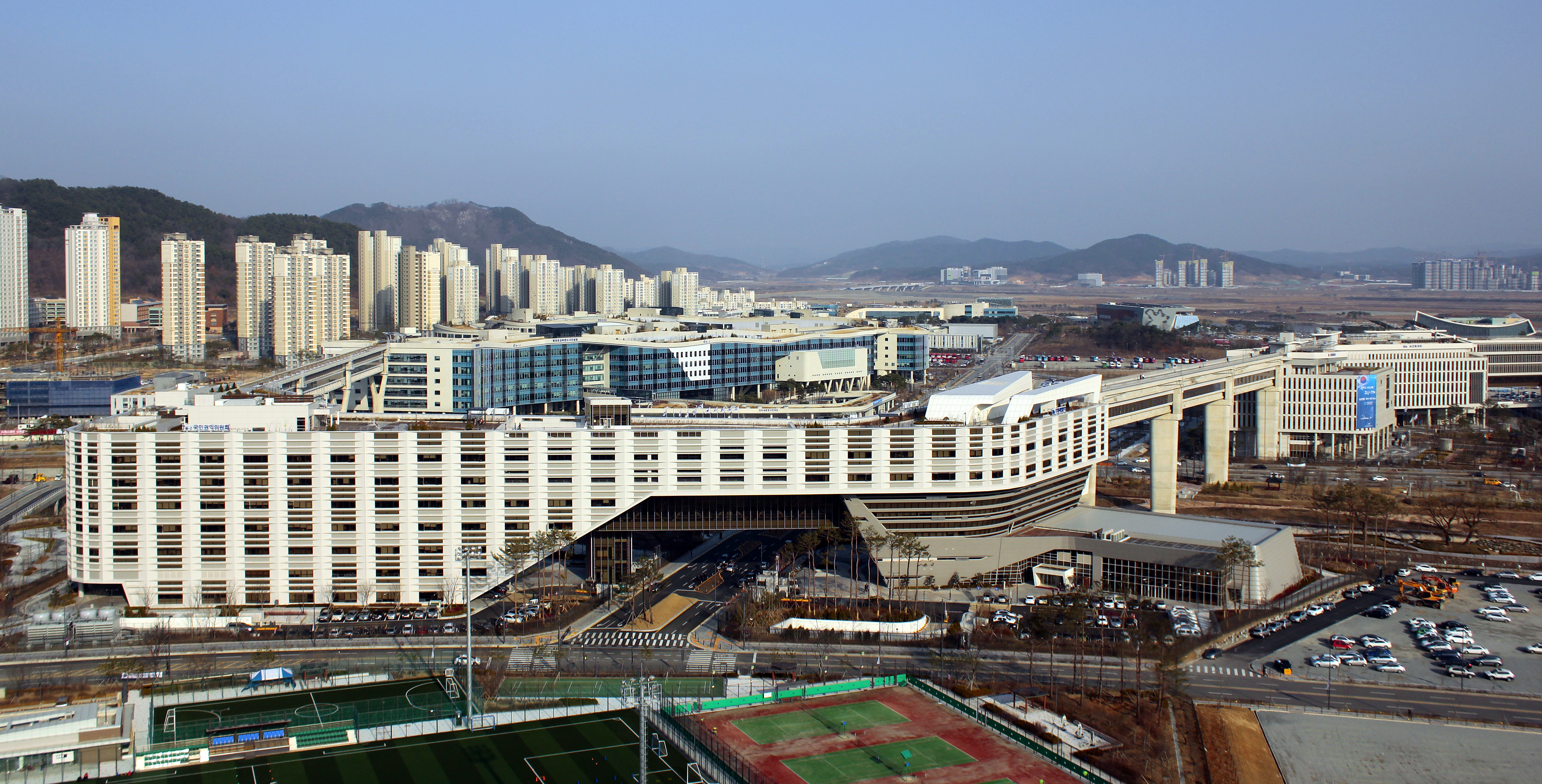
Government Complex, Sejong (Northern portion)

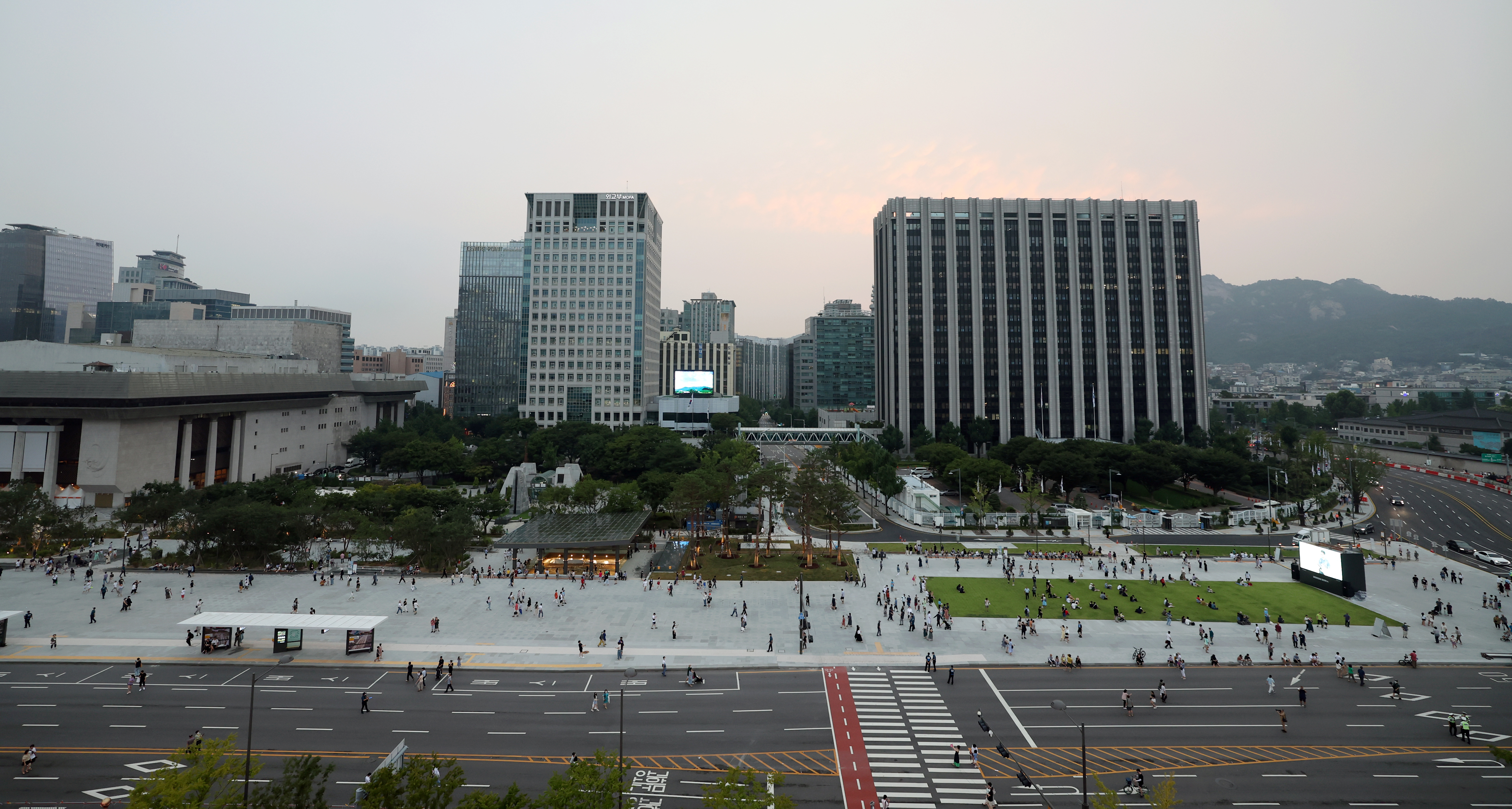
Central Government Complex, Seoul

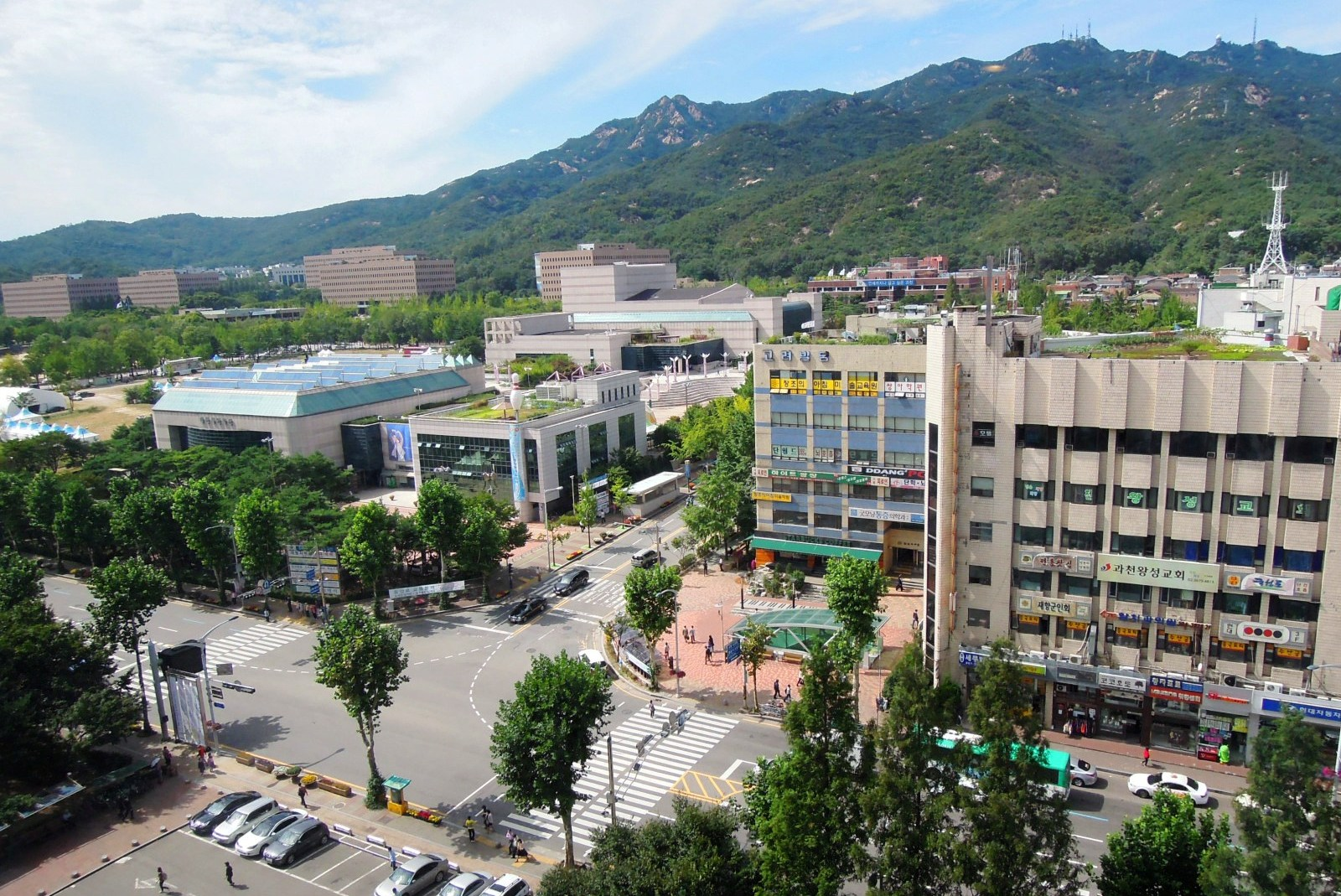
Government Complex Gwacheon

Government Complex, Daejeon

Currently, 19 ministries exist in the South Korean government. The 19 ministers are appointed by the President and report to the Prime Minister. Also, some ministries have affiliated agencies (listed below), which report both to the Prime Minister and to the minister of the affiliated ministry. Each affiliated agency is headed by a vice-minister-level commissioner except Prosecution Service which is led by a minister-level Prosecutor General.

The Minister of Strategy and Finance and the Minister of Education, by law, automatically assume the positions of Deputy Prime Ministers of the Republic of Korea.

The respective ministers of the below ministries assume the President's position in the below order, if the President cannot perform his/her duty and the Prime Minister cannot assume the President's position. Also note that the Constitution and the affiliated laws of the Republic of Korea stipulates only so far as the Prime Minister and the 19 ministers as those who can assume the President's position. Moreover, if the Prime Minister cannot perform his/her duty the Vice Prime Minister will assume the Prime Minister's position, and if both the Prime Minister and the Vice Prime Minister cannot perform the Prime Minister's role the President can either pick one of the 17 ministers to assume the Prime Minister's position or let the 17 ministers assume the position according to the below order.

The commissioner of National Tax Service, a vice-minister-level official by law, is customarily considered to be a minister-level official due to the importance of National Tax Service. For example, the vice-commissioner of the agency will attend meetings where other agencies would send their commissioners, and the commissioner of the agency will attend meetings where minister-level officials convene.

- Ministry of Economy and Finance (기획재정부; 企劃財政部)
  - National Tax Service (국세청; 國稅廳)
  - Korea Customs Service (관세청; 關稅廳)
  - Public Procurement Service (조달청; 調達廳)
  - Ministry of Data and Statistics (국가데이터처; 國家데이터處)
- Ministry of Education (교육부; 敎育部)
- Ministry of Science and ICT (과학기술정보통신부; 科學技術情報通信部)
  - Korea AeroSpace Administration (우주항공청; 宇宙航空廳)
- Ministry of Foreign Affairs (외교부; 外交部)
  - Overseas Koreans Agency (재외동포청; 在外同胞廳)
- Ministry of Unification (통일부; 統一部)
- Ministry of Justice (법무부; 法務部)
  - Supreme Prosecutors' Office (검찰청; 檢察廳)
- Ministry of National Defense (국방부; 國防部)
  - Military Manpower Administration (병무청; 兵務廳)
  - Defense Acquisition Program Administration (방위사업청; 防衛事業廳)
- Ministry of the Interior and Safety (행정안전부; 行政安全部)
  - National Police Agency (경찰청; 警察廳)
  - National Fire Agency (소방청; 消防廳)
- Ministry of Patriots and Veterans Affairs (국가보훈부; 國家報勳部)
- Ministry of Culture, Sports and Tourism (문화체육관광부; 文化體育觀光部)
  - Cultural Heritage Administration (문화재청; 文化財廳)
- Ministry of Agriculture, Food and Rural Affairs (농림축산식품부; 農林畜産食品部)
  - Rural Development Administration (농촌진흥청; 農村振興廳)
  - Korea Forest Service (산림청; 山林廳)
- Ministry of Trade and Industry (산업통상부; 産業通商部)
  - Ministry of Intellectual Property (지식재산처; 知識財産處)
- Ministry of Health and Welfare (보건복지부; 保健福祉部)
  - Korea Disease Control and Prevention Agency (질병관리청; 疾病管理廳)
- Ministry of Climate, Energy and Environment (기후환경에너지부; 氣候에너지環境部)
  - Korea Meteorological Administration (기상청; 氣象廳)
- Ministry of Employment and Labor (고용노동부; 雇用勞動部)
- Ministry of Gender Equality and Family (성평등가족부; 性平等家族部)
- Ministry of Land, Infrastructure and Transport (국토교통부; 國土交通部)
  - National Agency for Administrative City Construction (행정중심복합도시건설청; 行政中心複合都市建設廳)
  - Saemangeum Development and Investment Agency (새만금개발청; 새萬金開發廳)
- Ministry of Oceans and Fisheries (해양수산부; 海洋水産部)
  - Korea Coast Guard (해양경찰청; 海洋警察廳)
- Ministry of SMEs and Startups (중소벤처기업부; 中小벤처企業部)

Department	Formed	Employees	Annual budget	Location	Minister	Minister's Party
Ministry of Economy and Finance 기획재정부	February 29, 2008	1,297 (2019)	\21,062 billion (2019)	Sejong	Koo Yun-cheol	Independent
Ministry of Education 교육부	March 23, 2013	7,292 (2019)	\74,916 billion (2019)	Sejong	Choi Kyo-jin	Independent
Ministry of Science and ICT 과학기술정보통신부	July 26, 2017	35,560 (2019)	\14,946 billion (2019)	Sejong	Bae Kyung-hoon	Independent
Ministry of Foreign Affairs 외교부	March 23, 2013	656 (2019)	\2,450 billion (2019)	Seoul	Cho Hyun	Independent
Ministry of Unification 통일부	March 1, 1969	692 (2019)	\1,326 billion (2019)	Seoul	Chung Dong-young	Democratic Party
Ministry of Justice 법무부	July 17, 1948	23,135 (2019)	\3,880 billion (2019)	Gwacheon	Jung Sung-ho	Democratic Party
Ministry of National Defense 국방부	August 15, 1948	1,095 (2019)	\33,108 billion (2019)	Seoul	Ahn Gyu-back	Democratic Party
Ministry of the Interior and Safety 행정안전부	July 26, 2017	3,964 (2019)	\55,682 billion (2019)	Sejong	Yun Ho-jung	Democratic Party
Ministry of Patriots and Veterans Affairs 국가보훈부	June 5, 2023	337 (2023)	\ billion (2023)	Sejong	Kwon Oh-eul	Democratic Party
Ministry of Culture, Sports and Tourism 문화체육관광부	February 29, 2008	2,832 (2019)	\5,923 billion (2019)	Sejong	Choi Hwi-young	Independent
Ministry of Agriculture, Food and Rural Affairs 농림축산식품부	March 23, 2013	3,706 (2019)	\14,660 billion (2019)	Sejong	Song Mi-ryung	Independent
Ministry of Trade and Industry 산업통상부	Oct 1, 2025	1,503 (2019)	\7,693 billion (2019)	Sejong	Kim Jung-kwan	Independent
Ministry of Health and Welfare 보건복지부	March 19, 2010	3,637 (2019)	\72,515 billion (2019)	Sejong	Jeong Eun-kyeong	Independent
Ministry of Climate, Energy and Environment 기후에너지환경부	Oct 1, 2025	2,534 (2019)	\7,850 billion (2019)	Sejong	Kim Sung-hwan	Democratic Party
Ministry of Employment and Labor 고용노동부	July 5, 2010	7,552 (2019)	\26,716 billion (2019)	Sejong	Kim Young-hoon	Independent
Ministry of Gender Equality and Family 성평등가족부	Oct 1, 2025	323 (2019)	\1,047 billion (2019)	Seoul	Won Min-kyung	Independent
Ministry of Land, Infrastructure and Transport 국토교통부	March 23, 2013	4,443 (2019)	\43,219 billion (2019)	Sejong	Kim Yun-deok	Democratic Party
Ministry of Oceans and Fisheries 해양수산부	March 23, 2013	3,969 (2019)	\5,180 billion (2019)	Sejong	Jeon Jae-soo	Democratic Party
Ministry of SMEs and Startups 중소벤처기업부	July 26, 2017	1,082 (2019)	\10,266 billion (2019)	Sejong	Han Seong-sook	Independent

=== Independent agencies ===
The following agencies report directly to the President:

- Office of the President(대통령비서실; 大統領秘書室)
- Office of National Security(국가안보실; 國家安保室)

Korea's Presidential Advisory Body. Assists the President in his national security functions.

- Presidential Security Service (대통령경호처; 大統領警護處)
- Board of Audit and Inspection (감사원; 監査院)

The chairperson of the board, responsible for general administrative oversight, must be approved by the National Assembly to be appointed by the President. Also, although the law provides no explicit regulation regarding the chairperson's rank in the Korean government hierarchy, it is customary to consider the chairperson of the board to enjoy the same rank as a Vice Prime Minister. This is because the law stipulates that the secretary general of the board, the second highest position in the organization, be the rank of minister and therefore the chairperson, directly over the secretary general in the organization, should be at least the rank of Vice Prime Minister in order to be able to control the whole organization without any power clash.

- National Intelligence Service (국가정보원; 國家情報院)
- Korea Media and Communications Commission (방송통신미디어위원회; 放送通信미디어委員會)

The following councils advise the president on pertinent issues:

- National Security Council (국가안전보장회의; 國家安全保障會議)
- National Unification Advisory Council (민주평화통일자문회의; 民主平和統一諮問會議)
- National Economic Advisory Council (국민경제자문회의; 國民經濟諮問會議)
- Presidential Advisory Council on Science and Technology (국가과학기술자문회의; 國家科學技術諮問會議)

The following agencies report directly to the Prime Minister:

- Ministry of Personnel Management (인사혁신처; 人事革新處)
- Ministry of Government Legislation (법제처; 法制處)
- Ministry of Food and Drug Safety (식품의약품안전처; 食品醫藥品安全處)
- Fair Trade Commission (공정거래위원회; 公正去來委員會)
- Anti-Corruption and Civil Rights Commission (국민권익위원회; 國民權益委員會)
- Financial Services Commission (금융위원회; 金融委員會)
- Personal Information Protection Commission (South Korea) (개인정보보호위원회; 個人情報保護委員會)
- Nuclear Safety and Security Commission (원자력안전위원회; 原子力安全委員會)

The Independent Central Administrative Agencies are

- Corruption Investigation Office for High-ranking Officials (고위공직자범죄수사처; 高位公職者犯罪搜査處, CIO)

It is an independent agency for anti-corruption of high-ranking officials in South Korean government, established by 'Act On The Establishment And Operation Of The Corruption Investigation Office For High-ranking Officials'. According to judgment by the Constitutional Court of Korea in 2021, the CIO is officially interpreted as an independent agency inside the executive branch of the South Korean government, which means independence from the Cabinet of South Korea and the Office of the President. By article 3(3) and 17(2) of the Act, CIO's report on the President of South Korea is strictly prohibited, and it only reports to the National Assembly of South Korea.

- National Human Rights Commission of Korea (국가인권위원회; 國家人權委員會, NHRCK) is an independent agency for protecting and promoting human rights in South Korea. Though the NHRCK regards itself as independent from all three branches of the government, it is officially regarded as an independent administrative agency inside the executive branch, according to judgment by the Constitutional Court of Korea in 2010. It burdens duty to report its annual report directly to the President and the National Assembly, by Article 29 of the National Human Rights Commission of Korea Act.

=== Relocation of government agencies ===
Until 2013, almost all of the central government agencies were located in either Seoul or Gwacheon government complex, with the exception of a few agencies located in Daejeon government complex. Considering that Gwacheon is a city constructed just outside Seoul to house the new government complex, virtually all administrative functions of South Korea were still concentrated in Seoul. It has been decided, however, that government agencies decide if they will relocate themselves to Sejong Special Self-Governing City, which was created from territory comprising South Chungcheong Province, so that government agencies are better accessible from most parts of South Korea and reduce the concentration of government bureaucracy in Seoul. Since the plan was announced, 22 agencies have moved to the new government complex in Sejong.

The following agencies will settle in the Government Complex Seoul:

- Financial Services Commission (금융위원회)
- Ministry of Foreign Affairs (외교부)
- Ministry of Unification (통일부)
- Ministry of Gender Equality and Family (여성가족부)

The following agencies will settle in Seoul, but in separate locations:

- Board of Audit and Inspection (감사원) will continue to stay in Jongno District, Seoul.
- National Intelligence Service (국가정보원) will continue to stay in Seocho District, Seoul.
- Nuclear Safety and Security Commission (원자력안전위원회) will continue to stay in Jongno District, Seoul.
- National Security Council (국가안전보장회의) will continue to stay in Jongno District, Seoul.
- National Unification Advisory Council (민주평화통일자문회의) will continue to stay in Jung District, Seoul.
- National Economic Advisory Council (국민경제자문회의) will continue to stay in Jongno District, Seoul.
- Presidential Advisory Council on Science and Technology (국가과학기술자문회의) will continue to stay in Jongno District, Seoul.
- Ministry of National Defense (국방부) will continue to stay in Yongsan District, Seoul.
- Supreme Prosecutors' Office (검찰청) will continue to stay in Seocho District, Seoul.
- National Police Agency (경찰청) will continue to stay in Seodaemun District, Seoul.

The following agencies will settle in Government Complex Gwacheon:

- Korea Communications Commission (방송통신위원회)
- Ministry of Justice (법무부)
- Defense Acquisition Program Administration (방위사업청)

The following agencies will settle in Government Complex, Daejeon:

- Korea Customs Service (관세청)
- Public Procurement Service (조달청)
- Statistics Korea (통계청)
- Military Manpower Administration (병무청)
- Cultural Heritage Administration (문화재청)
- Korea Forest Service (산림청)
- Korean Intellectual Property Office (특허청)
- Korea Meteorological Administration (기상청)

The following agencies will settle in Government Complex Sejong:

- Office for Government Policy Coordination, Prime Minister's Secretariat (국무조정실, 국무총리비서실)
- Ministry of Personnel Management (인사혁신처)
- Ministry of Government Legislation (법제처)
- Fair Trade Commission (공정거래위원회)
- Anti-Corruption and Civil Rights Commission (국민권익위원회)
- Ministry of Strategy and Finance (기획재정부)
- Ministry of Education (교육부)
- Ministry of Science and ICT (과학기술정보통신부)
- Ministry of the Interior and Safety (행정안전부)
- Ministry of Patriots and Veterans Affairs (국가보훈부)
- Ministry of Culture, Sports and Tourism (문화체육관광부)
- Ministry of Agriculture, Food and Rural Affairs (농림축산식품부)
- Ministry of Trade, Industry and Energy (산업통상자원부)
- Ministry of Health and Welfare (보건복지부)
- Ministry of Environment (환경부)
- Ministry of Employment and Labor (고용노동부)
- Ministry of Land, Infrastructure and Transport (국토교통부)
- Ministry of Oceans and Fisheries (해양수산부)
- Ministry of SMEs and Startups (중소벤처기업부)
- National Tax Service (국세청)
- National Fire Agency (소방청)
- Multifunctional Administrative City Construction Agency (행정중심복합도시건설청)

The following agencies will settle in separate locations:

- Ministry of Food and Drug Safety (식품의약품안전처) will continue to stay in Cheongju, North Chungcheong Province.
- Rural Development Administration (농촌진흥청) will move to Jeonju, North Jeolla Province.
- Saemangeum Development and Investment Agency (새만금개발청) will move to Saemangeum development project area.
- Korea Coast Guard (해양경찰청) will continue to stay in Songdo, Yeonsu District, Incheon.

== Executive–Legislative Relations ==
Because the president and members of the National Assembly in South Korea are elected through separate elections, there is no guarantee that the president’s party will hold a majority in the legislature. In several periods, situations have arisen in which the president belonged to the ruling party, but opposition parties held a majority in the National Assembly — a condition referred to as a “minority government.” In such cases, political confrontation has sometimes occurred due to the differing party compositions of the executive and legislative branches. Notable examples include the early period of the Roh Moo-hyun administration (2003–2004), the final period of the Park Geun-hye administration (2016–2017), and the Yoon Suk Yeol administration (2022–2025).

=== Early period of the Roh Moo-hyun administration (2003–2004) ===
In the 2002 presidential election, Roh Moo-hyun was elected president, and the Millennium Democratic Party succeeded in regaining power. However, internal conflicts between factions supporting and opposing Roh led to a split in 2003, resulting in the formation of the Uri Party and the continuation of the Millennium Democratic Party. After President Roh withdrew from the Millennium Democratic Party, the party became part of the opposition, while the Uri Party obtained the status of the ruling party. As of November 2003, the Uri Party held 47 seats in the National Assembly, making it the smallest ruling party in South Korean constitutional history. The legislature was dominated by opposition parties. The Millennium Democratic Party and the Grand National Party jointly promoted the appointment of a special prosecutor to investigate alleged corruption involving presidential aides. On November 10, 2003, the National Assembly re-passed the Act on the Appointment of a Special Prosecutor to Investigate Allegations of Corruption Involving President Roh Moo-hyun’s Aides Choi Do-sul, Lee Kwang-jae, and Yang Gil-seung, overriding the president’s veto. It was the first instance in South Korean constitutional history in which a presidential veto was overturned by the National Assembly.

In March 2004, after President Roh declined opposition demands to apologize for an election law violation, the Grand National Party and the Millennium Democratic Party jointly initiated impeachment proceedings against him. On March 9, the two parties submitted the motion with the signatures of 159 lawmakers, exceeding a majority of the Assembly’s members, and on March 12, the National Assembly passed the motion with 193 votes in favor out of 195 cast. The National Assembly submitted the resolution to the Constitutional Court without a separate investigation, but the impeachment was dismissed by the Constitutional Court on May 14, and the president retained his office.

The confrontation between the executive and the legislature under the divided-government structure was also evident in the policymaking process.

The pension reform during the Roh Moo-hyun administration was carried out within this political context. At the time, the ruling Uri Party did not hold a majority in the National Assembly, while opposition parties such as the Grand National Party, the Millennium Democratic Party, and the Democratic Labor Party controlled most of the seats. As a result, the government’s reform bill underwent multiple revisions and delays during parliamentary deliberation.

In 2003, the government submitted a bill to amend the National Pension Act, which mainly included raising contribution rates and lowering benefit levels. Opposition parties, labor groups, and civic organizations opposed the reform centered on fiscal stability and called for the introduction of a basic pension scheme and the expansion of old-age income security. The government’s proposal failed to pass the Health and Welfare Committee of the National Assembly and was discarded. Subsequently, the government and the legislature each drafted separate bills focused respectively on fiscal sustainability and welfare expansion, but no agreement was reached. The Ministry of Health and Welfare revised and supplemented the bill with an emphasis on contribution-rate adjustment and the long-term sustainability of the system, while debates in the National Assembly continued due to differences in policy orientation between the ruling and opposition parties. The government’s proposal underwent several rounds of review and modification in the legislature, and the final amendment to the National Pension Act was passed in 2007 through bipartisan agreement.

=== Yoon Suk Yeol administration (2022–2025) ===
When President Yoon Suk Yeol took office in 2022, the 21st National Assembly was controlled by the Democratic Party of Korea, which held a single-party majority, while the president’s party, the People Power Party, held a minority of seats. As a result, the government operated under a divided-government structure in which it was difficult to pass legislation without the cooperation of the National Assembly. After taking office, President Yoon exercised his right to request reconsideration (veto power) several times against bills passed under the initiative of the opposition. The majority party in the National Assembly declined to adopt hearing reports for some cabinet nominees and introduced motions for dismissal, thereby initiating procedures to check the president’s appointment powers. The president appointed several ministers without parliamentary consent and did not accept the National Assembly’s dismissal motions. During this period, the executive and the legislature repeatedly exercised their constitutional powers of veto and impeachment. Amid the continued use of these powers, on December 3, 2024, the president declared martial law, and on December 14, the National Assembly passed an impeachment motion against him. On April 4, 2025, the Constitutional Court ruled to remove President Yoon from office.

== Judicial branch ==
The Supreme Court building in Seocho, Seoul

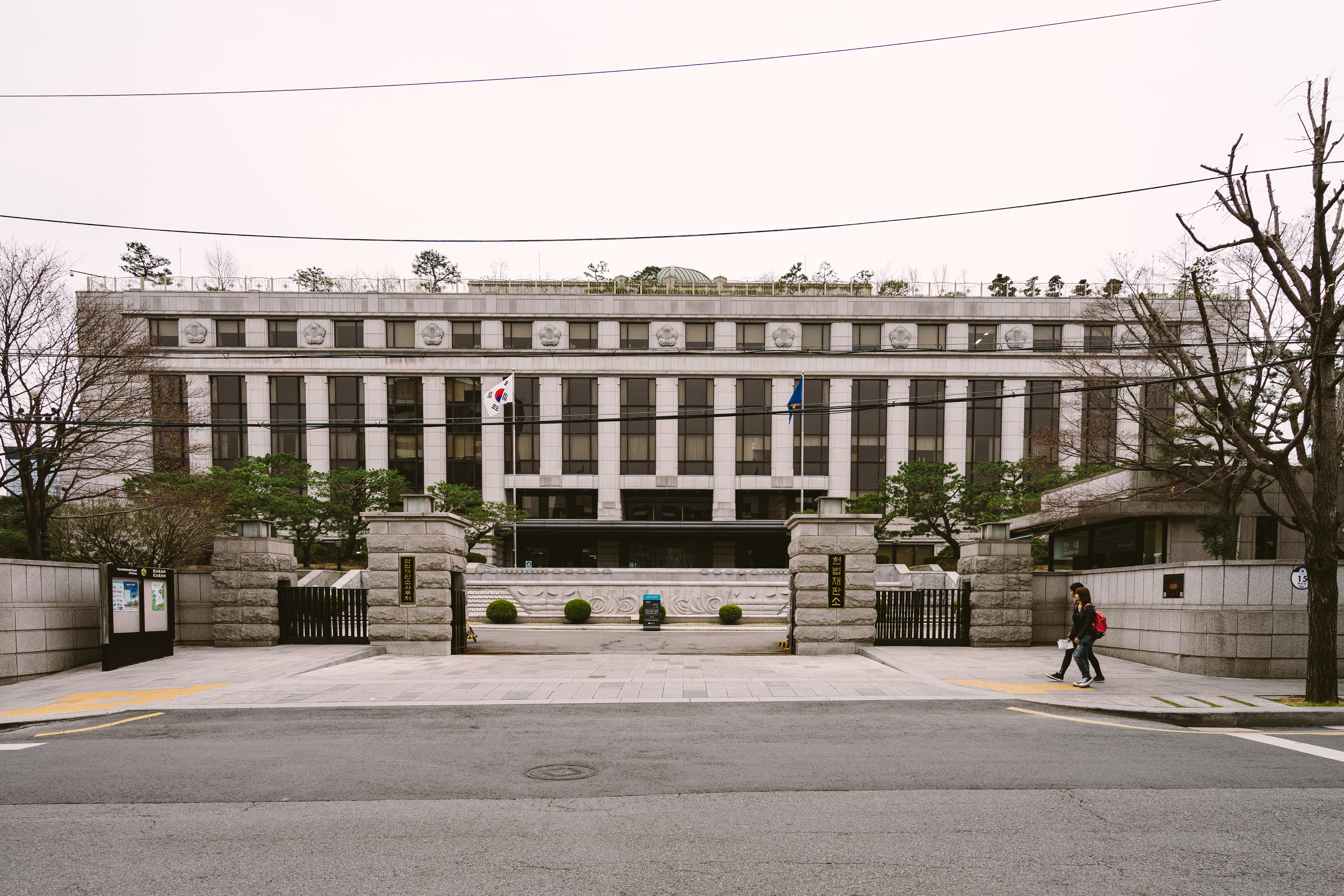
The Constitutional Court building in Jongno, Seoul

The judicial branch of South Korea is organized into two groups. One is the Constitutional Court which is the highest court on adjudication of matters on constitutionality, including judicial review and constitutional review. Another is ordinary courts on matters except jurisdiction of Constitutional Court. These ordinary courts regard the Supreme Court as the highest court. Both the Chief Justice of the Supreme Court and the President of the Constitutional Court have equivalent status as two heads of the judiciary branch in South Korea.

== Elections ==
Elections in South Korea are held on national level to select the President and the National Assembly. South Korea has a multi-party system, with two dominant parties and numerous third parties. Elections are overseen by the Electoral Branch of the National Election Commission. The most recent presidential election was held on 3 June 2025.

The president is directly elected for a single five-year term by plurality vote. The National Assembly has 300 members elected for a four-year term, 253 in single-seat constituencies and 47 members by proportional representation. Each individual party intending to represent its policies in the National Assembly must be qualified through the assembly's general election by either: i) the national party-vote reaching over 3.00% on a proportional basis or ii) more than 5 members of their party being elected in each of their first-past-the-post election constituencies.

Timeline of South Korean governments

== Local governments ==
Local autonomy was established as a constitutional principle of South Korea beginning with the First Republic. However, for much of the 20th century this principle was not honored. From 1965 to 1995, local governments were run directly by provincial governments, which in turn were run directly by the national government. However, since the elections of 1995, a degree of local autonomy has been restored. Local magistrates and assemblies are elected in each of the primary and secondary administrative divisions of South Korea, that is, in every province, metropolitan or special city, and district. Officials at lower levels, such as eup and dong, are appointed by the city or county government.

As noted above, local autonomy does not extend to the judicial branch. It also does not yet extend to many other areas, including fire protection and education, which are managed by independent national agencies. Local governments also have very limited policy-making authority; generally, the most that they can do is decide how national policies will be implemented. However, there is some political pressure for the scope of local autonomy to be extended.

Although the chief executive of each district is locally elected, deputy executives are still appointed by the central government. It is these deputy officials who have detailed authority over most administrative matters.

== Civil service ==
The South Korean civil service is managed by the Ministry of Personnel Management. This is large, and remains a largely closed system, although efforts at openness and reform are ongoing. In order to gain a position in civil service, it is usually necessary to pass one or more difficult examinations. Positions have traditionally been handed out based on seniority, in a complex graded system; however, this system was substantially reformed in 1998.

There are more than 800,000 civil servants in South Korea today. More than half of these are employed by the central government; only about 300,000 are employed by local governments. In addition, only a few thousand each are employed by the national legislative and judicial branches; the overwhelming majority are employed in the various ministries of the executive branch. The size of the civil service increased steadily from the 1950s to the late 1990s, but has dropped slightly since 1995

The civil service, not including political appointees and elected officials, is composed of career civil servants and contract civil servants. Contract servants are typically paid higher wages and hired for specific jobs. Career civil servants make up the bulk of the civil service, and are arranged in a nine-tiered system in which grade 1 is occupied by assistant ministers and grade 9 by the newest and lowest-level employees. Promotions are decided by a combination of seniority, training, and performance review. Civil servants' base salary makes up less than half of their annual pay; the remainder is supplied in a complex system of bonuses. Contract civil servants are paid on the basis of the competitive rates of pay in the private sector.

== Symbols ==
Emblem of the government of South Korea (1949–2016)

Flag of the government of South Korea (1949–2016)

The taegeuk symbol used by government and its institutions (from 2016)

Flag of the government of South Korea from 2016, some other governmental institutions uses the flag in the same pattern.

== See also ==
- Government of North Korea
- Politics of South Korea
- National Assembly
- Judiciary of South Korea
- Cabinet of South Korea
- Orders, decorations, and medals of South Korea
