= SDIA =

SDIA may refer to:

- Saemangeum Development and Investment Agency
- Susila Dharma International Association
- San Diego International Airport
- Soap and Detergent Industry Association, a former name of the UK Cleaning Products Industry Association
- Shajapur Dewas Industrial Area
