= Lee Yong-woo (politician) =

South Korean politician

- 이용우

Member of the National Assembly
- In office 30 May 2020 – 29 May 2024
- Preceded by: Kim Hyun-mee
- Succeeded by: Kim Young-hwan
- Constituency: Goyang D (Gyeonggi)

CEO of KakaoBank
- In office 22 January 2016 – 13 January 2020; Serving with Yoon Ho-young
- Preceded by: Position established
- Succeeded by: Yoon Ho-young

Personal details
- Born: 1 February 1964 (age 62) Chuncheon, South Korea
- Party: Democratic
- Spouse: Kim Kyung-ae
- Children: 1
- Education: Seoul National University
- Occupation: Banker, entrepreneur, politician

Lee Yong-woo (Korean: 이용우, born 1 February 1964) is a South Korean entrepreneur, banker and politician currently serving as the Member of the National Assembly for Goyang 4th constituency since 2020. Prior to entering politics, he was the co-CEO of KakaoBank, along with Yoon Ho-young.

== Early life and education ==
Born in Chuncheon, Lee was grown up in Busan, where he studied at Pujun Primary School, Busan East Secondary School and Gaya High School. He earned a bachelor's and a master's degree in economics at Seoul National University.

== Career ==
He joined the Hyundai Research Institute as a researcher in 1992. He worked at the General Planning Office at Hyundai Group, as well as a senior economist at Hyundai Investment Trust Securities. He led strategic planning, as well as mergers and acquisitions (M&A) at the Hyundai Motor Company. In addition, he also served as the Director of the Dongwon Securities, the Director of Strategic Planning of the Korea Investment Holdings, the Director of Asset Management Division of the Korea Investment & Securities and the Chief Investment Officer of the Korea Investment Management.

He founded KakaoBank along with Yoon Ho-young in the end of 2015 (officially in 2016) and subsequently became its co-CEO. Under his leadership, the company achieved a surplus within 2 years, as well as putting themselves as the largest online banking company in South Korea.

=== Political career ===
From 1992 to 1993, he worked as a secretary to the then Democratic MP Jae-Sik Chang, the father of Ha-Joon Chang.

On 12 January 2020, Lee was brought into the ruling Democratic Party. As he joined politics, he subsequently resigned from KakaoBank. On 24 February, he was confirmed as the candidate for Goyang 4th constituency, replacing the incumbent MP and the Minister of Land, Infrastructure and Transport Kim Hyun-mee who had declared to not seek for re-election. In the general election held on 15 April, he defeated the UFP candidate Kim Hyunah.

== Personal life ==
Lee married to Kim Kyung-ae.

He is also an elder brother to Lee Chan-woo, the former Assistant Minister of Economy and Finance.

== Election results ==
=== General elections ===
Year	Elections	Constituency	Political party	Votes (%)	Remarks
2020	21st National Assembly General Election	Goyang D (Gyeonggi)	Democratic	85,943 (53.42%)	Won
