= Kaib =

Kaib, KaiB, or KAIB may refer to:

- KAIB (FM), one of the radio stations of Air 1
- KaiB, a gene
- KAI Bandara, an Indonesian railway operator
- Korea Aviation Accident Investigation Board
- Rami Kaib (born 1997), Swedish footballer
