= Park Sang-woo =

South Korean urban planner (born 1955)

- 박상우
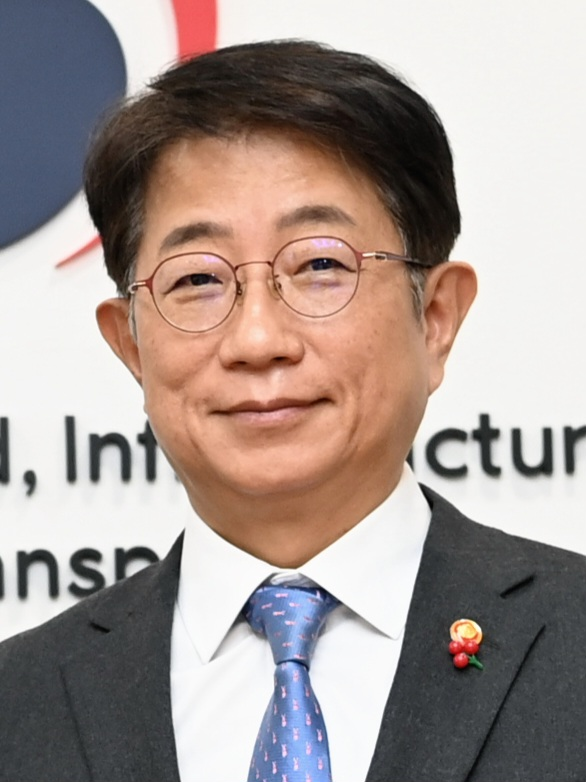

8th Minister of Land, Infrastructure and Transport
- In office 23 December 2023 – 29 July 2025
- President: Yoon Suk Yeol
- Prime Minister: Han Duck-soo
- Preceded by: Won Hee-ryong
- Succeeded by: Kim Yoon-deok

Personal details
- Born: 9 November 1955 (age 70) Busan, South Korea
- Party: Independent

Korean name
- Hangul: 박상우
- RR: Bak Sangu
- MR: Pak Sangu

Park Sang-woo (Korean: 박상우; born 9 November 1955) is a South Korean politician who served as the eighth minister of land, infrastructure and transport from 2023 to 2025.

== Early life ==
Park was born in Busan, South Korea. He graduated from the Department of Public Administration at Korea University in Seoul. He received a master's degree in urban and regional planning from George Washington University in the United States and a doctorate in engineering in urban planning from Gachon University in Incheon.

== Career ==
He entered public service through the 27th Administrative Examination. He served as the Director of the Housing Policy Division, Director of the Construction Policy Division, and Director of the Planning and Coordination Division at the Ministry of Land, Infrastructure and Transport, and served as the Director of the Housing and Land Division during the Lee Myung-bak government. At that time, he promoted several policies, including the relaxation of the upper limit on the sale price and the abolition of the excess profit recovery system for reconstruction.

Afterwards, he served as the president of the Korea Construction Policy Research Institute, and in 2016, he was appointed president of the Korea Land & Housing Corporation (LH), where he served until 2019.

In December 2023, he took office as Minister of Land, Infrastructure and Transport.

In June 2024, he expressed his support for the abolition of the Comprehensive Real Estate Tax.
