= Air China Flight 129 =

2002 aviation accident in South Korea

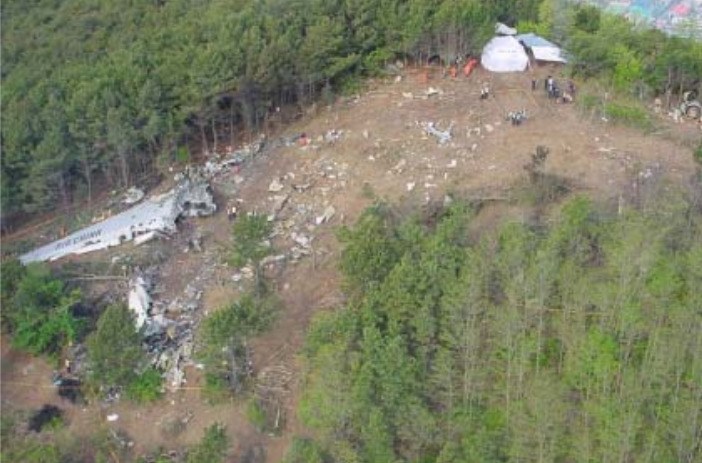
- Aerial view of the crash site

Accident
- Date: 15 April 2002
- Summary: Controlled flight into terrain due to pilot error
- Site: Mount Dotdae, near Gimhae International Airport, Busan, South Korea; 35.2327°N 128.9280°E

Aircraft
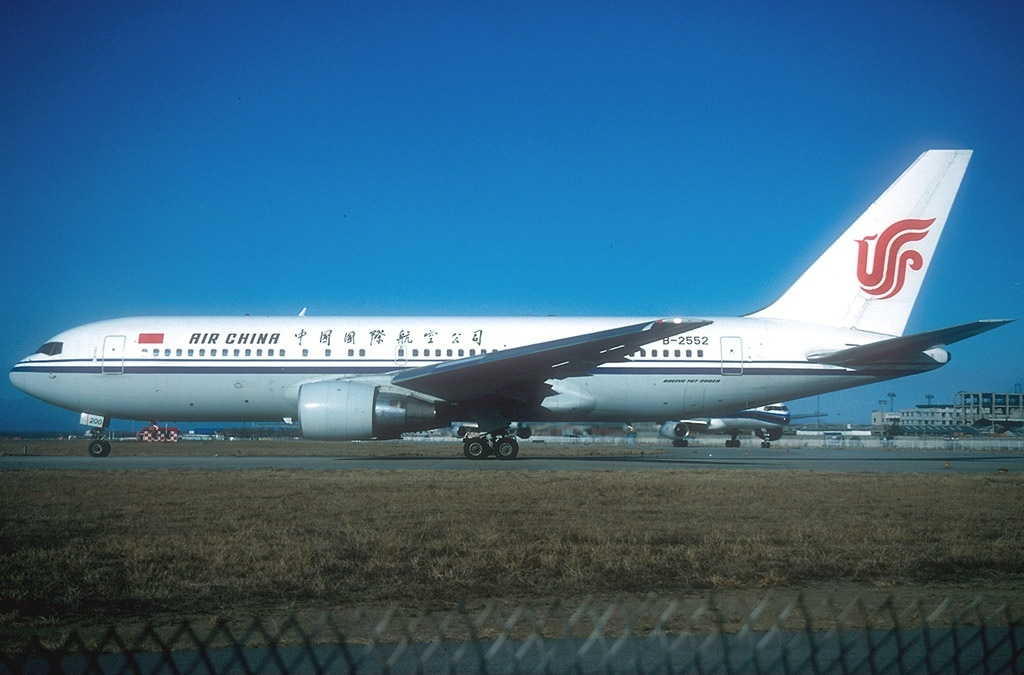
- B-2552, the aircraft involved in the accident, seen in 1997
- Aircraft type: Boeing 767-2J6ER
- Operator: Air China
- IATA flight No.: CA129
- ICAO flight No.: CCA129
- Call sign: AIR CHINA 129
- Registration: B-2552
- Flight origin: Beijing Capital International Airport, Beijing, China
- Destination: Gimhae International Airport, Busan, South Korea
- Occupants: 166
- Passengers: 155
- Crew: 11
- Fatalities: 129
- Injuries: 37
- Survivors: 37

Air China Flight 129 (CCA129/CA129) was a scheduled international passenger flight, operated by Air China, from Beijing Capital International Airport to Gimhae International Airport in Busan. On 15 April 2002, the aircraft on this route, a Boeing 767, crashed into a hill named Mount Dotdae near Gimhae Airport, killing 129 of the 166 people on board.

The Korea Aviation Accident Investigation Board published the final report in March 2005 and concluded that the crash was due to pilot error. The final report stated that the crew was inadvertently flying below the minimum safe altitude. Detailed information from the report also revealed that the pilots had been trained to conduct a circling approach in the airline's simulator only for Beijing Capital International Airport and never for a circling approach to Gimhae Airport's runway 18R. Subsequently, the report also blamed the tower controllers at Gimhae Airport for not using the tower BRITE and MSAW systems after losing visual contact with the aircraft. The Civil Aviation Administration of China responded to South Korea's official report by pointing out that Park Junyong, the ATC official during the accident, was not licensed for air traffic control and issued incorrect orders due to his inexperience with the Boeing 767.

The plan to build a new airport in the southeastern region was brought forward because of this accident.

Flight 129 was recorded as the deadliest aviation accident in South Korea until the crash of Jeju Air Flight 2216 in 2024, that killed 179.

== Accident ==
Seating plan

The flight took off at 08:37 Beijing local time CST (00:37 UTC). After nearly two hours in flight, it began to approach Gimhae Airport in light rain and mist.

At 11:16 Korean local time KST (02:16 UTC), CA129 received clearance to use the ILS approach to runway 36L, then circle to runway 18R (the same runway from the opposite direction) from Gimhae tower. During the circling approach to land on runway 18R, the crew exercised poor crew resource management and lost sight of the runway while delaying the base turn and flying outside of the circling approach area, and crashed into a hill named Mt. Dotdae at 11:21 local time (02:21 UTC). The aircraft made initial contact with the terrain when its right wing clipped a tree. It then impacted the ground, and the force of the impact broke the airplane apart. The right wing, empennage, left wing, parts of the fuselage, and both engines separated. The plane then burst into flames, engulfing the cockpit and forward fuselage. The aircraft slid and destroyed several trees and 12 graves. Thirty-seven of those on board survived, including the captain. The post-impact fire was so hot that it melted the aluminum and other metals of the fuselage. The front part of the fuselage was destroyed, making it difficult for investigators to recognize it.

== Aircraft ==
The aircraft involved, photographed in 1985 at Boeing's Everett factory just prior to delivery to CAAC Airlines

The aircraft was a Boeing 767-200ER delivered in 1985, and registered in China as B-2552. It was previously operated by the Civil Aviation Administration of China (CAAC) and then transferred to Air China after CAAC's split. It had accumulated more than 39,500 flight hours and about 14,300 flights.

== Passengers and crew ==
Nationality	Passengers	Crew	Total
China	19	11	30
South Korea	135	0	135
Uzbekistan	1	0	1
Total	155	11	166

Among the 155 passengers, 135 were from South Korea, 19 were from China, and one passenger was from Uzbekistan. All 11 of the crew were from China.

Many of the South Koreans were returning to South Korea after visiting China.

The flight deck crew was:

- Captain Wu Xinlu (30). (Note: simplified Chinese: 吴新禄; traditional Chinese: 吳新祿; pinyin: Wú Xīnlù) Captain Wu Xinlu entered the Civil Aviation Flying University of China in September 1990 and graduated in 1994. He then joined Air China, and in 2001, he was promoted to captain. After 26 November 2001, he began officially flying as a captain. He had 6,497 hours of flying experience (including 6,287 hours on the Boeing 767) and had flown five times to Busan.
- First Officer Gao Lijie (29). (Note: simplified Chinese: 高立杰; traditional Chinese: 高立傑; pinyin: Gāo Lìjié) First Officer (Co-Pilot) Gao Lijie entered the Air Force Academy in August 1989 and graduated in September 1993. He joined Air China and completed his first flight as a first officer on 23 February 2002. Prior to becoming a first officer, he had flown twice to Busan. He had accumulated 5,295 hours of flying experience, with 1,215 of them on the Boeing 767.
- Second Officer Hou Xiangning (27). (Note: simplified Chinese: 侯向宁; traditional Chinese: 侯向寧; pinyin: Hóu Xiàngníng) Second Officer (Third Pilot) Hou Xiangning attended the Civil Aviation Flying University of China from September 1993 to June 1997 and was hired by Air China in August 1997. Hou had no experience of landing in Busan. He had accumulated 1,775 hours of flying experience, including 1,078 hours on the Boeing 767.

The captain and two of the flight attendants survived.

== Investigation ==
=== Weather ===
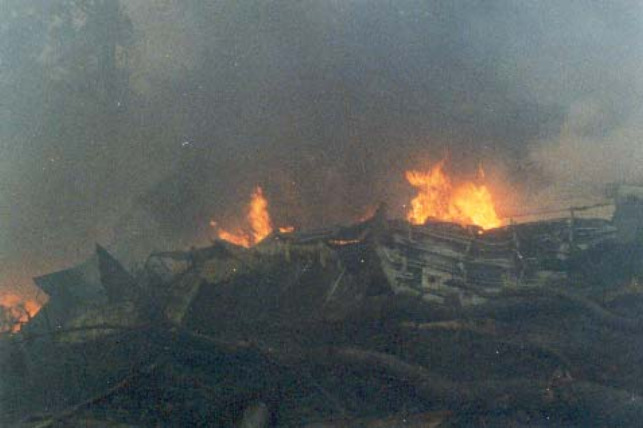
The wreckage of the aircraft on fire

At Gimhae Airport, the winds come from the north in autumn and winter. However, in spring and summer, the winds come from the south. Visibility is often partially poor due to sea fog, since the southern part of the airport is located close to the sea. Mountainous terrain in the north with southerly winds prevailing may cause a mass of low clouds and fog to occur along the mountainous area north of Runway 18R, with a probability of increased precipitation in the area.

The weather at the time of the crash was poor. Satellite imagery retrieved from the Korea Meteorological Administration radar showed that a large, wide area of rain clouds could be seen, starting from Busan to the southeast as far as Japan and moving slowly to the east. The clouds moved very slowly, and heavy clouds were seen lying in the sea south of Gimhae. Gusts of up to 16 knots (30 km/h; 18 mph) were also observed. Rescue squads at the crash site also reported that it was covered with thick fog, with the precipitation heavier than a drizzle.

=== Airport lighting ===
Investigators interviewed Captain Wu, who stated that as he observed the lights on the final approach course to Runway 36L, he saw that neither the runway approach lights on the downwind leg nor the circling guidance lights during the circling approach were on. According to the record of the automatic aeronautical light switching system and the testimony from the Gimhae Tower duty chief, the runway, approach lights, and circling guidance lights were on at the time of the accident.

=== Survivors' statements ===
There were a total of 166 occupants on board, composed of 11 crew members and 155 passengers, including five children aged three to nine years old. On the day of the accident, 39 people survived the crash with serious injuries. A passenger died the following day, and 16 days later, another passenger died..

Based on interviews with the survivors on board Flight 129, it was revealed that the accident occurred suddenly, with a loud noise and violent shaking of the aircraft at the point of impact. All items inside the aircraft fell, the seats were thrust forward, and all lights went out, leaving it dark. The fire filled the cabin with heavy smoke, which made it difficult to breathe. Most of the passengers briefly lost consciousness during impact, with the feet and legs of some passengers forced under the seats in front of them. A flight attendant who was seated at the aft right position stated that his body was crushed underneath something. He reached to open the door, but could not find the handle. He crawled out of the cabin and evacuated the survivors. The survivors then escaped by walking or crawling through the gaps in the broken fuselage. As they escaped, several large explosions were heard, with pillars of fire shooting up high into the sky.

The pre-flight safety demonstration and announcements were made in Chinese and English, but not in Korean. Some of the 135 Korean passengers stated they did not understand them. The South Korean investigative board recommended that Air China add announcements in Korean to flights to and from South Korea.

=== Official report by South Korea ===
Both the flight data recorder and the cockpit voice recorder were retrieved from the crash site and examined by investigators. The FDR data did not show any defect in the aircraft's controls and instruments.

The official accident report by the Korea Aviation Accident Investigation Board was released on 4 March 2005. The Probable Cause read:

1. The flight crew of flight 129 performed the circling approach, not being aware of the weather minima of wide-body aircraft (B767-200) for landing, and in the approach briefing, did not include the missed approach, etc., among the items specified in Air China's operations and training manuals.
2. The flight crew exercised poor crew resource management and lost situational awareness during the circling approach to runway 18R, which led them to fly outside of the circling approach area, delaying the base turn, contrary to the captain's intention to make a timely base turn.
3. The flight crew did not execute a missed approach when they lost sight of the runway during the circling approach to runway 18R, which led them to strike high terrain (mountain) near the airport.
4. When the first officer advised the captain to execute a missed approach, about five seconds before impact, the captain did not react, nor did the first officer initiate the missed approach himself.

=== Official comments by China ===
The Civil Aviation Administration of China published a 28-page side-by-side comparison of South Korea's official report. Liu Yajun, the head of the Chinese investigation team, stated,

1. An ATC official in the airport, Park Junyong, was not licensed for air traffic control by the South Korean Construction and Transportation Ministry.
2. Park did not know the properties of the aircraft, a Boeing 767, and mistakenly directed the airliner to descend to 700 feet (213.5 m) instead of directing the airliner to descend to 1,100 (335.5 m), which is the recommended safe altitude for a Boeing 767.
3. The airport did not inform the crew of the weather conditions at the time. Eight flights before CA129 had been directed to land at other airports because of bad weather.
4. There were also problems with the radar system and lighting at Gimhae Airport.

=== Television portrayal ===
The investigation was covered in "Turning Point", a 2017 episode (S17E03) of Mayday, a Canadian documentary television series about air crashes.

== See also ==
- Ground proximity warning system
- Similar accidents and incidents:
  - Air Inter Flight 148
  - Air France Flight 296Q
  - Asiana Airlines Flight 733, the previous deadliest plane crash in South Korea, which also happened under similar circumstances
  - Dan-Air Flight 1008
  - Garuda Indonesia Flight 152, the deadliest aviation accident in Indonesia
  - Korean Air Flight 801
  - United Airlines Flight 2860
