= Korea Aviation Accident Investigation Board =

- Korea Aviation Accident Investigation Board (KAIB)
- Hangul: 항공 사고 조사 위원회
- Hanja: 航空事故調査委員會
- Revised Romanization: Hanggong sago josa wiwonhoe
- McCune–Reischauer: Hanggong sago chosa wiwŏnhoe

The Korea Aviation Accident Investigation Board (KAIB, Korean: 항공사고조사위원회) was a South Korean agency that investigated aviation accidents and incidents. Around 2005 its headquarters were in Gonghang-dong, Gangseo-gu, Seoul, near Gimpo International Airport, and its flight data recorder/cockpit voice recorder and wreckage laboratory was located on the property of Gimpo Airport. Around 2004 it had been headquartered in Gwacheon, Gyeonggi-do.

The agency was established on August 12, 2002, replacing the Investigation Division of the Civil Aviation Bureau, Ministry of Construction and Transportation. On July 10, 2006, the Aviation and Railway Accident Investigation Board formed as a result of a merger between the KAIB and the Railway Accident Investigation Board.

== Investigations ==
- Air China Flight 129

== See also ==
- Korea Office of Civil Aviation (South Korean civil aviation agency)
- Korea Maritime Safety Tribunal (maritime accident investigation agency)
- The Korea Transport Institute (South Korean transportation research institute)
