= Hong Jee-sun =

South Korean politician

- Hong in 2026

Minister of Land, Infrastructure and Transport
- Incumbent
- Assumed office 22 September 2026
- President: Lee Jae Myung
- Prime Minister: Han Seong-sook
- Preceded by: Kim Yoon-deok

Vice Minister of Land
- In office 29 December 2025 – 21 September 2026
- President: Lee Jae Myung
- Prime Minister: Kim Min-seok; Han Seong-sook

Personal details
- Born: 11 April 1970 (age 56) Donghae, South Korea
- Education: Hanyang University; University of Birmingham

Hong Jee-sun (born 11 April 1970) is a South Korean politician. He was the Vice Minister of Land and is the Minister of Land, Infrastructure and Transport.

== Biography ==
Hong was born in 1970 in Donghae, Gangwon. He gained a degree in civil engineering at Hanyang University and a master's degree in urban and regional planning from the University of Birmingham. He passed the national civil service exam in 1996.

In February 2020, Hong was awarded the Red Stripes Order of Service Merit. He was assistant governor for urban housing in Gyeonggi from July 2020 to June 2023. In January 2024, Hong became vice mayor of Namyangju.

Hong was appointed Vice Minister of Land in December 2025. Hong was nominated for Minister of Land, Infrastructure and Transport in August 2026 by president Lee Jae Myung, and the Land, Infrastructure and Transport Committee in the National Assembly confirmed him on September 21, 2026.
