= Korea Office of Civil Aviation =

South Korean civil aviation authority

The Korea Office of Civil Aviation (KOCA) (Korean: 항공정책실; Hanja: 航空政策室) is the South Korean civil aviation authority. It is subordinate to the Ministry of Land, Infrastructure and Transport (MOLIT). The head office is in the Sejong Government Complex in Sejong City. As of 2013 the Deputy Minister of the Office of Civil Aviation is Dr. Choi Jeong-ho.

== History ==
The Ministry of Construction and Transportation (MOCT) established the Aviation Bureau on 31 August 1963, marking the formal beginning of a centralized civil aviation authority in South Korea. On 12 August 2002, this bureau was dissolved and replaced by the Civil Aviation Safety Authority (CASA). A new office for aviation was later created on 6 May 2009. reinstation an organization entity to oversee aviation affairs.

With the reorganization of the Ministry in 2013, the Aviation Office was renamed the Korea Office of Civil Aviation (KOCA) and became a subordinate agency under the Ministry of Land, Infrastructure and Transport (MOLIT).

In 2022, KOCA and the U.S. Federal Aviation Administration (FAA) entered a Declaration of Cooperation focused on Advanced Air Mobility (AAM), including development of regulatory frameworks, safety oversight, and certification strategies for emerging urban air mobility technologies.

KOCA has increasingly expanded its role through internation collaboration, including partnering with the Internation Civil Aviation Organization (ICAO)—notably, signing MoUs in 2023 to improve aviation safety, technical cooperation, and contribute to planning a national aviation museum.

== See also ==
- Aviation and Railway Accident Investigation Board (current air and rail accident investigation agency)
- Korea Aviation Accident Investigation Board (former air accident investigation agency)
- The Korea Transport Institute (government transportation research institute)
