= Kim Yoon-deok =

South Korean politician

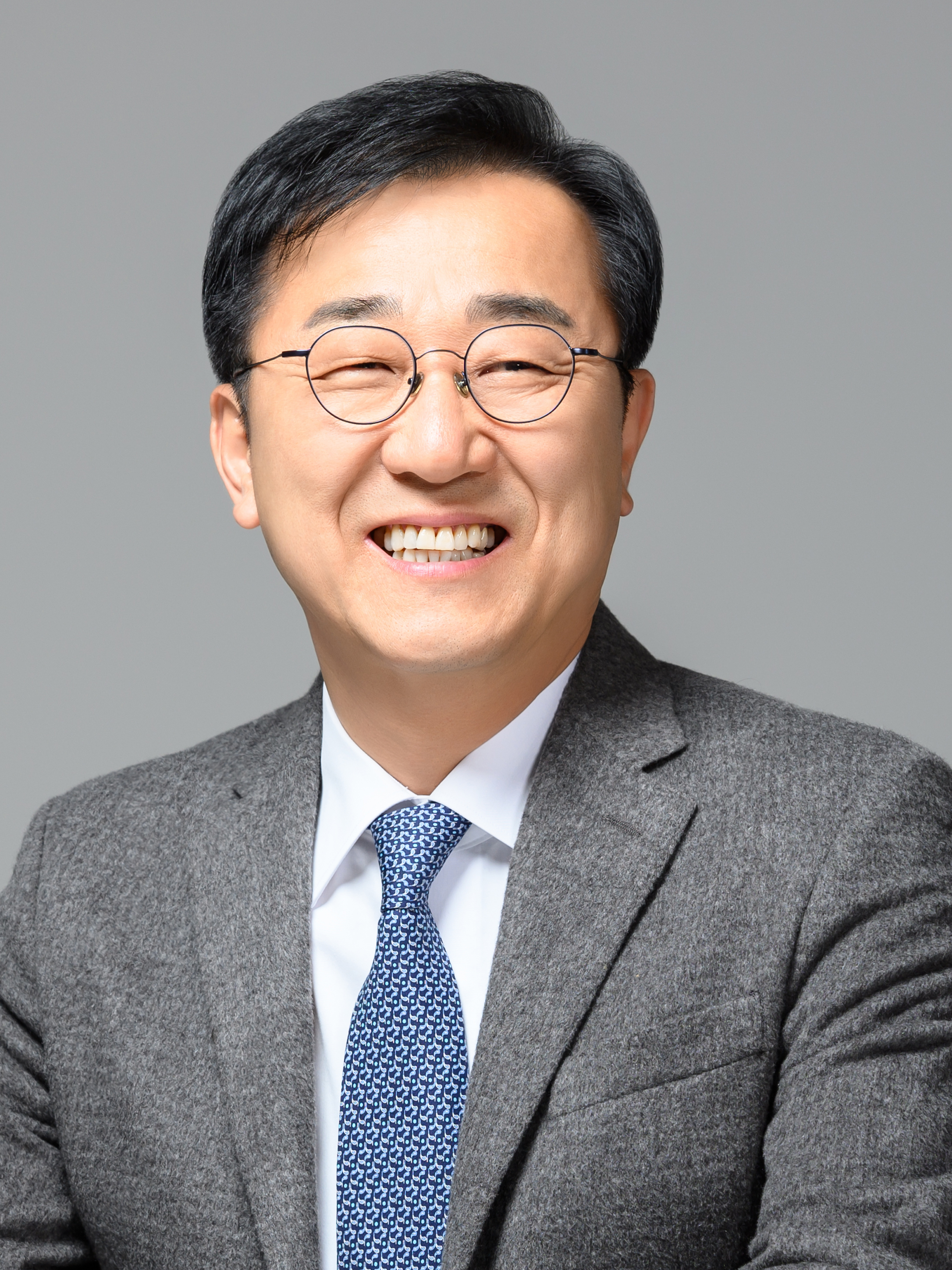
- Kim in 2021

Ministry of Land, Infrastructure and Transport
- In office 31 July 2025 – 22 September 2026
- President: Lee Jae Myung
- Prime Minister: Kim Min-seok; Han Seong-sook
- Preceded by: Park Sang-woo
- Succeeded by: Hong Jee-sun

Member of the National Assembly
- In office 30 May 2012 – 29 May 2016
- Preceded by: Shin Geun
- Succeeded by: Kim Kwang-soo (Jeonju A, North Jeolla)
- Constituency: Jeonju Wansan A (North Jeolla)

Member of the National Assembly
- Incumbent
- Assumed office 30 May 2020
- Preceded by: Kim Kwang-soo
- Constituency: Jeonju A (North Jeolla)

Personal details
- Born: 23 May 1966 (age 60) Buan County, North Jeolla Province, South Korea
- Party: Democratic Party of Korea
- Education: Jeonbuk National University

Kim Yoon-deok (Korean: 김윤덕) is a South Korean politician who has served as the Minister of land, infrastructure and transport from 2025 to 2026. A Member of the Democratic Party of Korea (DPK), he has been a member of the National Assembly from 2012 to 2016 and since 2020.

== Biography ==
Kim was born on May 23, 1966, in Buan County. He graduated from Chonbuk National University with a degree in accounting. Kim was a member of the North Jeolla Provincial Assembly.

Kim was elected to National Assembly for Jeonju District A to 19th National Assembly in 2012. Kim was a member of the National Assembly from the 19th National Assembly to the 22nd National Assembly. During his time in the National Assembly, he was in the Culture, Sports, Tourism, Broadcasting and Communications Committee, Education, Culture, Sports and Tourism Committee; the Special Committee on Budget and Accounts, Land, and Infrastructure and Transport Committee.

During the parliamentary audit of the Gyeonggi government, Kim defended then-governor Lee Jae Myung from People Power Party allegations regarding the Daejang-dong development scandal. Kim was nominated for Minister of Land, Infrastructure, and Transport on July 11, 2025. Kang Hoon-sik, the Chief of Staff to the President, cited Kim's experience on the Land, Infrastructure, and Transport Committee as a reason for his appointment.

== Election results ==
=== General elections ===
Year	Elections	Constituency	Political party	Votes (%)	Results
2012	19th National Assembly General Election	Jeonju Wansan A (North Jeolla)	DUP	32,847 (52.08%)	Won
2016	20th National Assembly General Election	Jeonju A (North Jeolla)	Democratic	38,265 (42.42%)	Defeated (2nd)
2020	21st National Assembly General Election	Jeonju A (North Jeolla)	Democratic	67,849 (73.57%)	Won
2024	22nd National Assembly General Election	Jeonju A (North Jeolla)	Democratic	83,081 (77.59%)	Won

=== Local elections ===
==== North Jeolla Province Council ====
Year	Elections	Constituency	Political party	Votes (%)	Remarks
2006	4th Iocal Election	North Jeolla Jeonju 2nd	Uri	14,792 (48.03%)	Won
