= National Agency for Administrative City Construction =

Government agency of South Korea

National Agency for Administrative City Construction (NAACC)
- 행정중심복합도시건설청
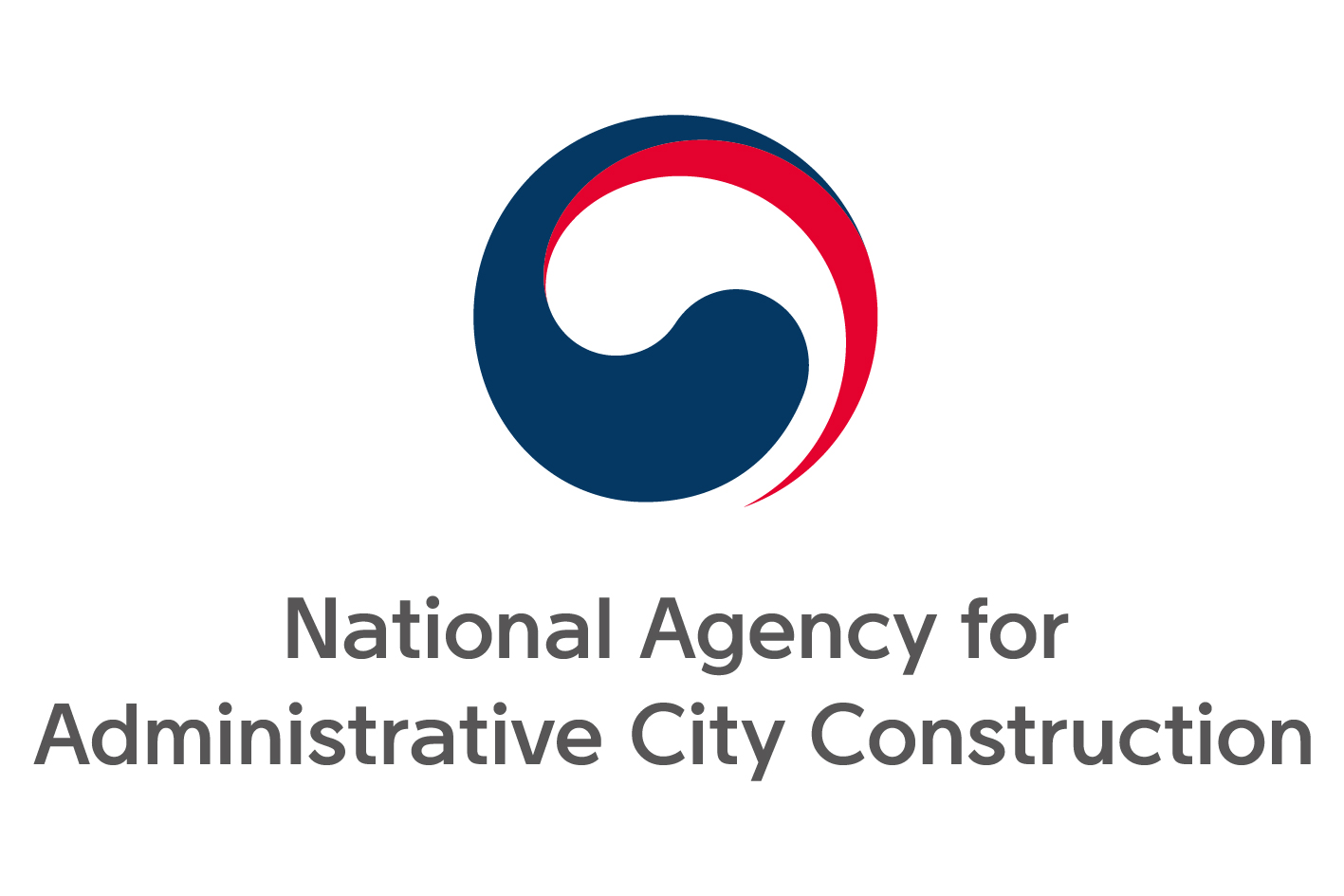

Agency overview
- Formed: 1 January 2006
- Jurisdiction: Government of South Korea
- Headquarters: 11 Doum 6-ro, Sejong City, South Korea
- Employees: 141
- Agency executives: Lee Moon-gi, Administrator; Park Moo-ik, Vice Administrator
- Parent department: Ministry of Land, Infrastructure and Transport
- Website: NAACC English website

Korean name
- Hangul: 행정중심복합도시건설청
- Hanja: 行政中心複合都市建設廳
- RR: Haengjeong jungsim bokhap dosi geonseolcheong
- MR: Haengjŏng chungsim pokhap tosi kŏnsŏlch'ŏng

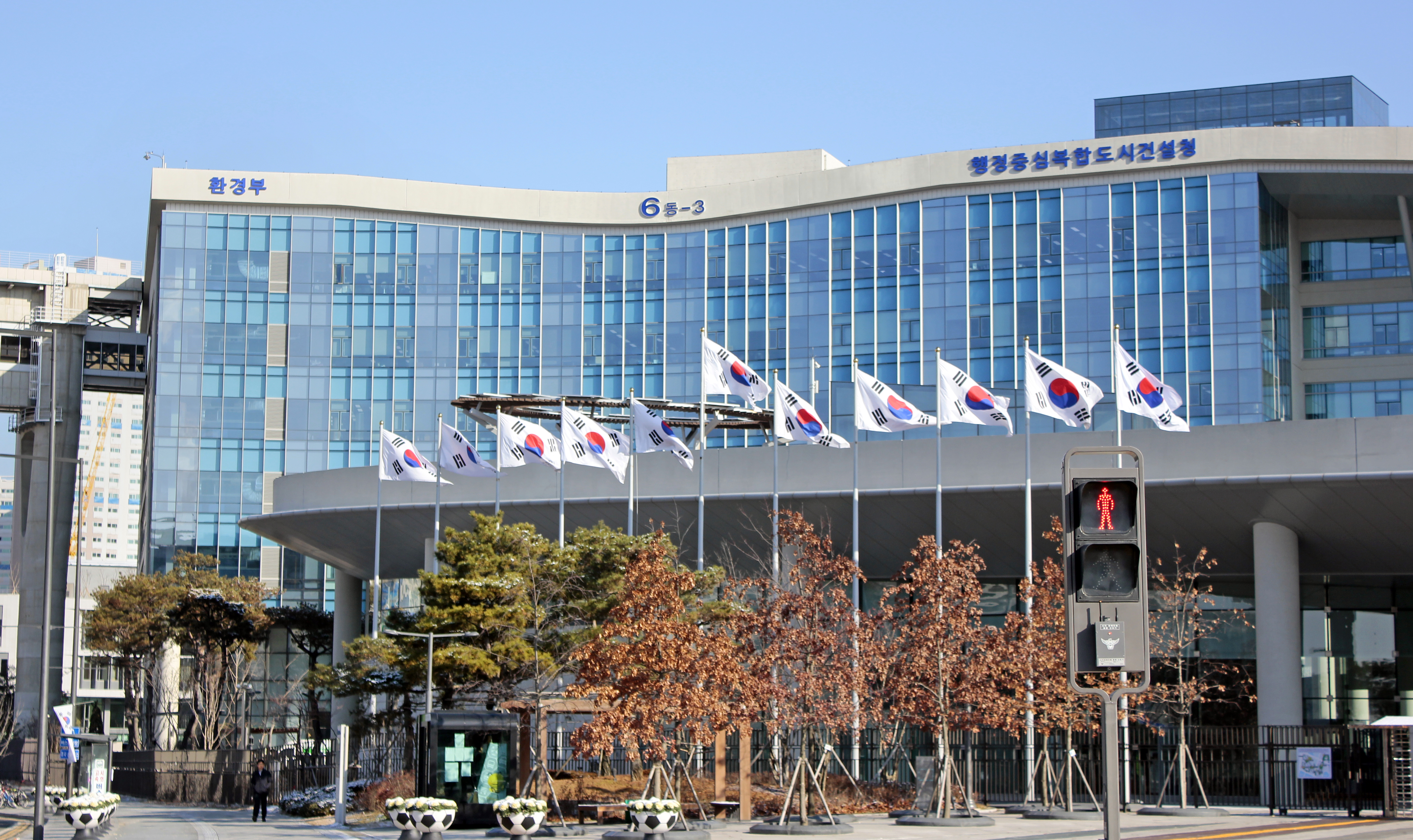
Headquarters in Sejong City

The National Agency for Administrative City Construction (NAACC; Korean: 행정중심복합도시건설청) is an organization under the Ministry of Land, Infrastructure and Transport responsible for completing the Multifunctional Administrative City (MAC) in Sejong City. It was founded in 2006 and is located in Sejong City. The Agency is led by vice-ministerial-level administrator.

Unlike many other government organisations which are founded by the Government Organization Act, the Agency is founded by the special law exclusively dealt with Sejong City. Hence, the agency exclusively deals with issues related to MAC, a government complex in Sejong, and its planning and construction. However, before the Sejong City Government officially commenced its operation in 2012, it temporarily managed administrative duties of the whole Sejong.

With initial relocation of administrative agency to MAC completed, the agency is given another project of planning and constructing the regional branch of the National Assembly currently located in Seoul.

Upon MAC project's completion, it is expected that the agency will be dissolved as a division of either the Ministry of central government or Sejong city government.

Its first head, Lee Choon-hee, is currently a two-term mayor of Sejong.

== History ==
- April 2005: Presidential Committee on Promoting Multifunctional Administrative City created
- January 2006: NAACC founded under then-Ministry of Construction and Transport
- July 2007: Ground-breaking Ceremony of the MAC
- February 2008: re-organised under then-Ministry of Land, Transport and Maritime Affairs
- December 2012: moved to its current headquarter in Sejong
- March 2013: re-organised under Ministry of Land, Infrastructure and Transport

== See also ==
- Sejong City
