= Korea Land & Housing Corporation =

South Korean government-owned corporation

Korea Land and Housing Corporation
- Company type: Government-owned corporation
- Industry: Housing, land & city development, maintenance of land & housing
- Founded: October 1, 2009
- Headquarters: Choongui-ro, Jinju-si, Gyeongsangnam-do, South Korea
- Number of employees: 9,800 (2020)
- Parent: Ministry of Land, Infrastructure and Transport
- Website: lh.or.kr

- Korea Land & Housing Corporation
- Hangul: 한국토지주택공사
- Hanja: 韓國土地住宅公社
- RR: Hanguk toji jutaek gongsa
- MR: Han'guk t'oji chut'aek kongsa

The Korea Land & Housing Corporation (LH) is a government-owned corporation which is responsible for the development of land in cities, and the maintenance and management of land and housing.

== Foundation Basis ==
LH was built by law to form the Korea Land Development Corporation, and the Korea Housing Corporation. The two companies were merged in 2009 by the government to form the current LH.

== Foundation Reason ==
Under the government's plan to advance the public corporations, it aims to eliminate overlapping functions, such as the establishment of housing development projects carried out by the Korea Housing Corporation and Korea Land Corporation, and to contribute to the development of the national economy by providing new funds.

== History ==
=== Korea Land Corporation ===
- Founded on April 1, 1975, Korea Land Corporation's predecessor, the Land Safety Fund.
- March 27, 1979, Korea Land Development Corporation.
- December 31, 1980 A housing development project started under the Act on Promotion of Housing Site Development.
- September 13, 1988 Construction of the First New Towns in the Seoul Metropolitan Area Based on the Two Million Housing Construction Plan. (Bundang, Ilsan, Pyeongchon, Middle East)
- 1 January 1996, Changing name as Korea Land Corporation.
- December 21, 2001, The first phase of the construction of the second largest new city in the Seoul Metropolitan Area (Pangyo, Dongtan, Yangchon and Okjeong)
- December 27, 2002 Started the Gaesong Industrial Complex Project.
- March 19, 2007, 6 Innovative city projects were launched, including Kimchun Innovation City in North Gyeongsang Province.
- December 14, 2007, The government pushed for the construction of the 3rd New Town in the Seoul Metropolitan Area to stabilize the real estate market (Songpa, Dongtan, and Geomdan).
- January 1, 2008, New BI L + (L +) Official Announcement.

=== Korea Housing Corporation ===
- July 1, 1962 Korea Housing Corporation was established.
- In 1962, Korea's first apartment complex constructed.(Mapo)
- In 1965, Creating a large-scale housing complex (132,232 m2, Hwagok-dong, Gangseo, Seoul)
- In 1971, First Rental Apartment Building (Open Dong)
- In 1978, Construction of Jamsil Apartment (19,180) (1975 - 1978)
- In 1979, Construction of Banpo Apartment Complex (No. 7,906) (1971 - 1979)
- In 1983, Construction of Gaepo Apartment Complex (No. 1, 5710) (1979-1983)
- In 1984, Construction of Gwacheon New Town (13,522) (1980 to 1984)
- In 1987, Construction of apartments in Jung-gu, Seoul (1984 - 1987)
- In 1989, Construction of Sanggye New Town (42,874) (1986-1989)
- In 1997, moving to Bundang New Building
- In 1998, Construction of Korea's First National Rental Housing (Suwon pavilion)
- In 2002, Named Green Building Certification Body
- In 2004, Construction of Korea's first 10-year public rental apartment (Osan Bridge)
- In 2005, Housing construction number 1.66 million achieved
- In 2006, a public housing development project was launched (Pangyo, Sungnam City).
- In 2007, Housing Construction reached 1.95 million
- In 2007, First Public Enterprise Department Organizational Reform
- In 2007, Korea's Best Housing Service Awards (Best of Green Section)

Korea Land & Housing Corporation

- In October 2009, Korea Housing Corporation and Korea Land Corporation were integrated into the Korea Land and Housing Corporation.
- May 4, 2015 Moving the Headquarters to Jinju City

== Apartment Brand ==
- Humansia
- Tranchae
- Jugong Green Ville
- A Thousand Trees
- ANDANTE
