= Kim Jin-suk (activist) =

South Korean labor activist (born 1960)

- Born: July 7, 1960 (age 65)
- Occupations: Welder, activist
- Known for: Hanjin Heavy Industries crane protest; Hope Bus movement

Korean name
- Hangul: 김진숙
- RR: Gim Jinsuk
- MR: Kim Chinsuk

Kim Jin-suk (Korean: 김진숙; born July 7, 1960) is a South Korean welder and trade union and democracy activist. Her 309-day occupation of Crane 85 at Busan's Youngdo shipyard in 2011 inspired the Hope Bus movement.

== Early life ==
Kim grew up on Ganghwa Island. She moved to Busan in 1978 to work in the garment industry, first at hanbok factory, then a men's clothing factory. Kim became one of South Korea's first female welders when she joined the Korea Shipbuilding Corporation’s Youngdo shipyard in Busan in 1981, at the age of 21. She was the only woman in the shipyard.

== Labor activism ==
She was elected as a representative of her labor union in February 1986. After distributing literature critical of the corruption in the union’s executive board, she was interrogated by the police. Kim was fired from her post at the shipyard in July 1986. Having been tortured in the same building as Park Jong-chul, she was inspired to take part in the June Democratic Struggle. Working as a "third party" to help other workers organize (which was at the time against Korean law), she was jailed twice between 1987 and 1996.

== 2011 crane occupation and reinstatement campaign ==
Kim garnered international attention for her 309-day occupation of a crane at Youngdo shipyard in 2011. Her occupation was in protest against the plan of Hanjin Heavy Industries (now HJ Shipbuilding & Construction) to lay off 400 shipyard workers, which had set off a wildcat strike. Kim chose to occupy Crane 85 in honor of union leader Kim Ju-ik, who had committed suicide during a 2003 occupation of that crane.

From the crane, she tweeted under the handle @JINSUK_85. Her first tweet read, "My new high-rise home has a great ocean view." Her tweets helped garner national attention to the occupation. She was supported by the "Hope Bus" movement, which organized nationwide convoys bringing supporters to the shipyard. After 309 days, the union members unanimously approved a new contract, and most of the remaining fired union workers were rehired with severance pay.

However, she did not secure her own job. As she battled cancer, she launched a second national movement, which secured her honorary reinstatement at HJ Shipbuilding & Construction Co. She was reinstated and retired at a ceremony on February 25, 2022.

== Legacy ==
Labour activists have argued that the Hope Bus movement marked a change in the Korean labor movement toward a strategy of broad social solidarity, in which ordinary citizens are enlisted in the fight.

== In popular culture ==
The 2016 documentary film The Island of Shadows by Kim Jeongkeun examines Kim Jinsook's crane occupation.

Her speech from a reinstatement rally in Busan was sampled in the title track of the 2025 Korea Music Awards-winning album Hail to the Music by Danpyunsun and the Moments Ensemble.
