= Saemangeum Development and Investment Agency =

Government agency of South Korea

Saemangeum Development and Investment Agency (SDIA)
- 새만금개발청

Agency overview
- Formed: 12 September 2013
- Preceding agencies: Saemangeum Development Division of Ministry of Culture, Sports and Tourism; Saemangeum Development Division of Ministry of Agriculture, Food and Rural Affairs
- Jurisdiction: Government of South Korea
- Headquarters: 466, Saemangeumbuk-ro, Gunsan, Jeollabuk-do, South Korea
- Employees: 120
- Agency executives: Kim Kyung-ahn, Administrator; Yoon Soon-hee, Vice Administrator
- Parent department: Ministry of Land, Infrastructure and Transport
- Child agency: Saemangeum Development Corporation
- Website: SDIA English website

Korean name
- Hangul: 새만금개발청
- Hanja: 새萬金開發廳
- RR: Saemangeum gaebalcheong
- MR: Saeman'gŭm kaebalch'ŏng

Saemangeum Development and Investment Agency (SDIA, Korean: 새만금개발청) is a government agency of South Korea. It is under the Ministry of Land, Infrastructure and Transport and is responsible for the management and funding of Saemangeum: tidal flats on South Korea's east coast. It was founded in 2013 and is currently located in Gunsan. The Agency is led by vice-ministerial-level administrator.

Unlike many other government organisations which are founded by the Government Organization Act, the Agency is founded by the special law exclusively dealt with Saemangeum project. Hence, the agency solely deals with issues related to and within the Saemangeum area.

It works closely with two organisations under Prime Minister's Office established by the same law, Saemangeum Committee composed of high-ranking government officials and experts and Saemangeum Project Support Bureau composed of bureaucrats.

The Agency is administering the area that was previously managed by Seamangeum Gunsan Free Economic Zone Authority from 2008. The special law re-organised the management of the region and created the Agency whilst the Authority was dissolved later in 2018.

In 2017, Saemangeum oversaw the securing of the 2023 World Scout Jamboree, which was to be held in South Korea.

== History ==
- September 2013: SDIA founded under Ministry of Land, Infrastructure and Transport
- December 2018: moved its headquarters to current location in Gunsan

== See also ==
- Saemangeum
- Saemangeum Seawall
