= Kim Hyun-mee (politician) =

South Korean politician (born 1962)

- 김현미
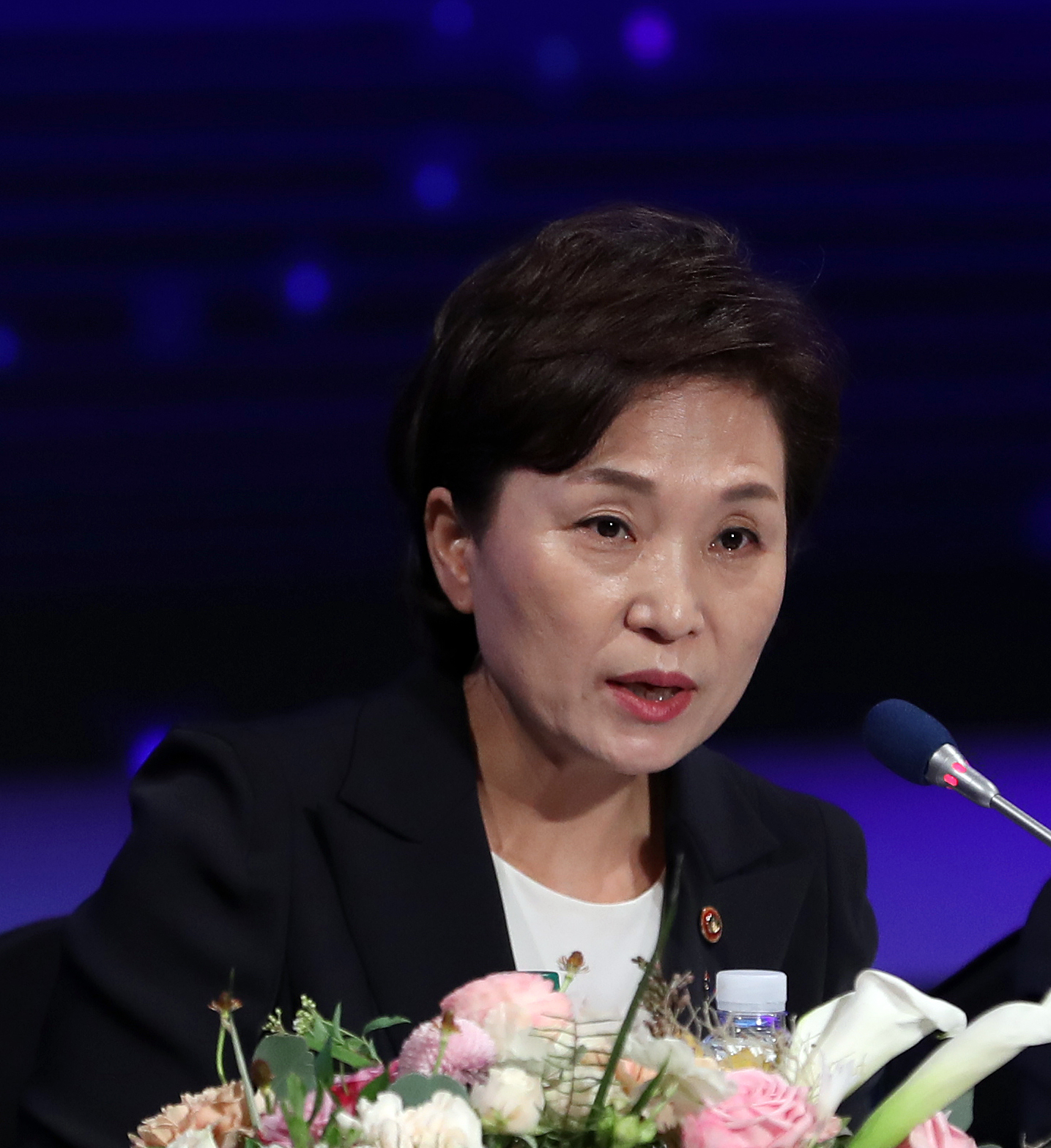

Minister of Land, Infrastructure and Transport
- In office 21 June 2017 – 28 December 2020
- President: Moon Jae-in
- Prime Minister: Lee Nak-yon; Chung Sye-kyun
- Preceded by: Kang Ho-in
- Succeeded by: Byeon Chang-heum

Member of the National Assembly
- In office 30 May 2012 – 29 May 2020
- Preceded by: Kim Yeong-seon
- Succeeded by: Lee Yong-woo
- Constituency: Goyang Ilsanseo (Gyeonggi, 2012-2016); Goyang D (Gyeonggi, 2016-2020)
- In office 30 May 2004 – 29 May 2008
- Constituency: Proportional representation

Personal details
- Born: 29 November 1962 (age 63) Jeongeup, South Korea
- Party: Democratic
- Education: Yonsei University

Korean name
- Hangul: 김현미
- Hanja: 金賢美
- RR: Gim Hyeonmi
- MR: Kim Hyŏnmi

Kim Hyun-mee (Korean: 김현미; born 29 November 1962) is a South Korean politician previously served as the Minister of Land, Infrastructure and Transport (MOLIT) under President Moon Jae-in from 2017 to 2020. She is the first woman to lead this ministry since its creation in 1948.

She was the first chief of staff to then-party leader of Democratic Party, Moon Jae-in. She is also a three-term parliamentarian of the Democratic Party.

As of September 2019, Kim is leading one of three ministries which heads have not changed since the beginning of the Moon's presidency despite several reshuffles until December 2020 when she and Park Neung-hoo's successors were nominated and later appointed.

She graduated from Yonsei University with a Bachelor of Arts in Political Science and Diplomacy.

== Electoral history ==
Election	Year	District	Party affiliation	Votes	Percentage of votes	Results
17th National Assembly General Election	2004	Proportional representation (11st)	Uri Party	8,145,824	38.26%	Elected
18th National Assembly General Election	2008	Goyang Ilsanseo (Gyeonggi)	United Democratic Party	40,198	41.48%	Lost
19th National Assembly General Election	2012	Goyang Ilsanseo (Gyeonggi)	Democratic United Party	63,432	50.64%	Won
20th National Assembly General Election	2016	Goyang D (Gyeonggi)	Democratic Party	66,959	49.15%	Won
