= Ministry of Land, Infrastructure and Transport =

Government ministry of South Korea

- 국토교통부

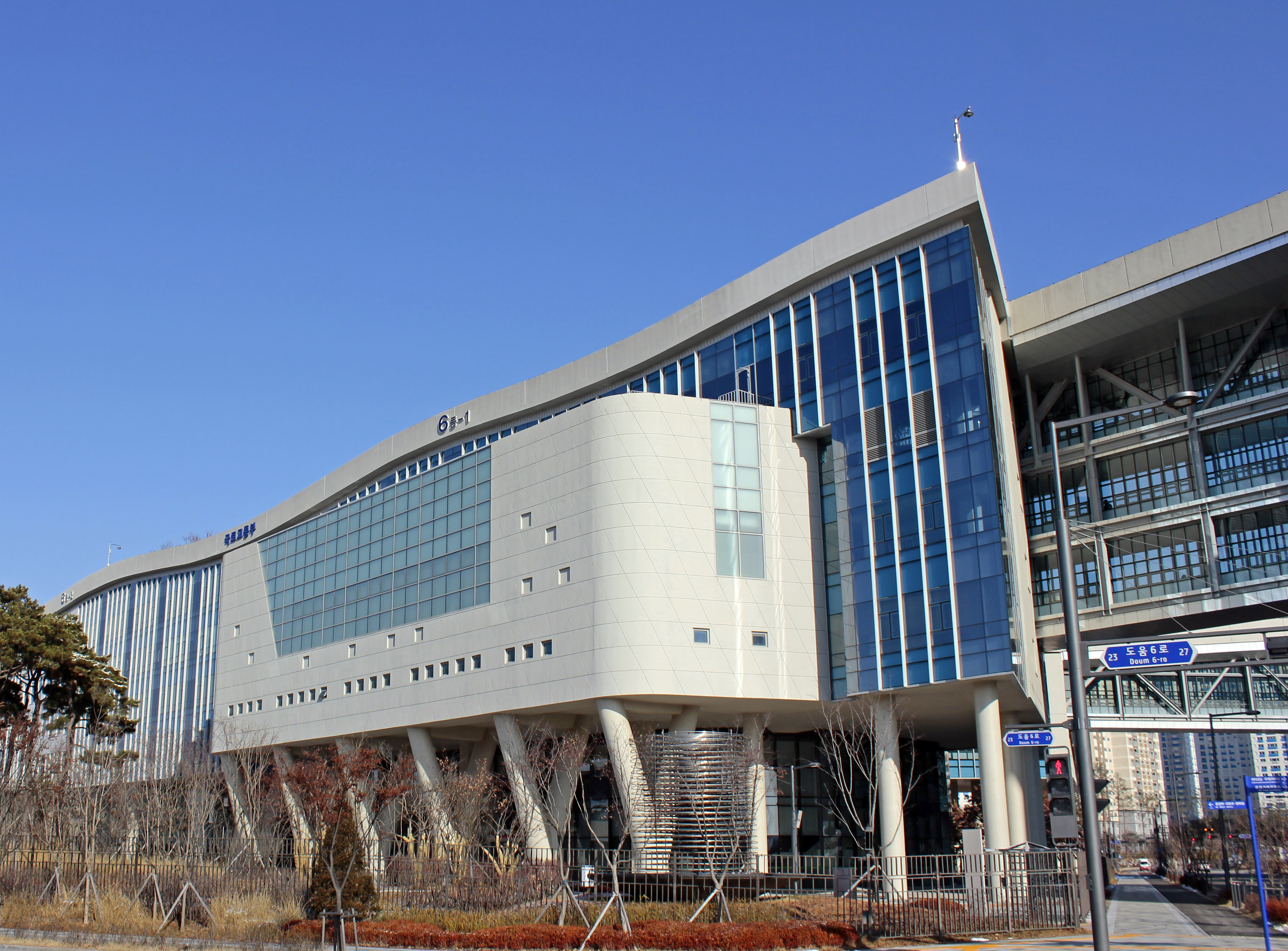
- MOLIT headquarters in Sejong

Agency overview
- Formed: November 4, 1948 (as Ministry of Transportation); March 23, 2013
- Preceding agencies: Ministry of Transportation (1948–1994); Ministry of Development (1955–1961); Ministry of Construction (1961–1994); Ministry of Construction and Transportation (1994–2008); Ministry of Land, Transport and Maritime Affairs (2008–2013)
- Jurisdiction: Government of South Korea
- Headquarters: 11, Doum6-ro, Sejong, South Korea
- Employees: 1,036
- Minister responsible: Hong Jee-sun
- Deputy Ministers responsible: Kim Yi-tak - 1st Vice Minister of City and Housing; Jeong Ui-Gyeong - 2nd Vice Minister of Transportation and Aviation
- Child agencies: National Agency for Administrative City Construction; Saemangeum Development and Investment Agency
- Website: www.molit.go.kr

Korean name
- Hangul: 국토교통부
- Hanja: 國土交通部
- RR: Gukto gyotongbu
- MR: Kukt'o kyot'ongbu

The Ministry of Land, Infrastructure and Transport (MOLIT; Korean: 국토교통부; lit. 'Ministry of Land and Transport') is a cabinet-level division of the government of South Korea. Its headquarters is in the Sejong Government Office in Sejong City. Previously the agency was headquartered in the 4th building of the Gwacheon Government Complex, in Gwacheon, Gyeonggi-do.

The main tasks are establishing and coordinating national territory policy and basic laws related to national territory, preserving and developing national territory and water resources, construction of urban, road and housing, construction of coastal, river and land reclamation.

== History ==
The ministry was originally the Ministry of Construction and Transportation. The Ministry of Maritime Affairs and Fisheries was merged into the construction and transportation agency.

== Logo ==
1948~?

?~2005

2005~2008

2008~2013

2013~2016

2016~present

== Agencies ==
- National Agency for Administrative City Construction
- Saemangeum Development and Investment Agency
- Aviation and Railway Accident Investigation Board
- Korea Office of Civil Aviation
- Korean Maritime Safety Tribunal

No.	Portrait	Name	Term of office			President
No.	Portrait	Name	Took office	Left office	Time in office	President
1			26 July 2017	5 April 2019	1 year, 253 days	Moon Jae-in
2			8 April 2019	23 December 2020	1 year, 259 days	Moon Jae-in
3			24 December 2020	9 May 2022	1 year, 136 days	Moon Jae-in
4			12 May 2022	8 December 2024	2 years, 210 days	Yoon Suk Yeol
5		Kim Yoon-deok	19 July 2025	22 September 2026	1 year, 65 days	Lee Jae Myung
5		Hong Jee-sun	22 September 2026	Incumbent	24 days	Lee Jae Myung

== See also ==
- Transport in South Korea
- Korail
