= Concert at SEA =

Annual Dutch pop festival

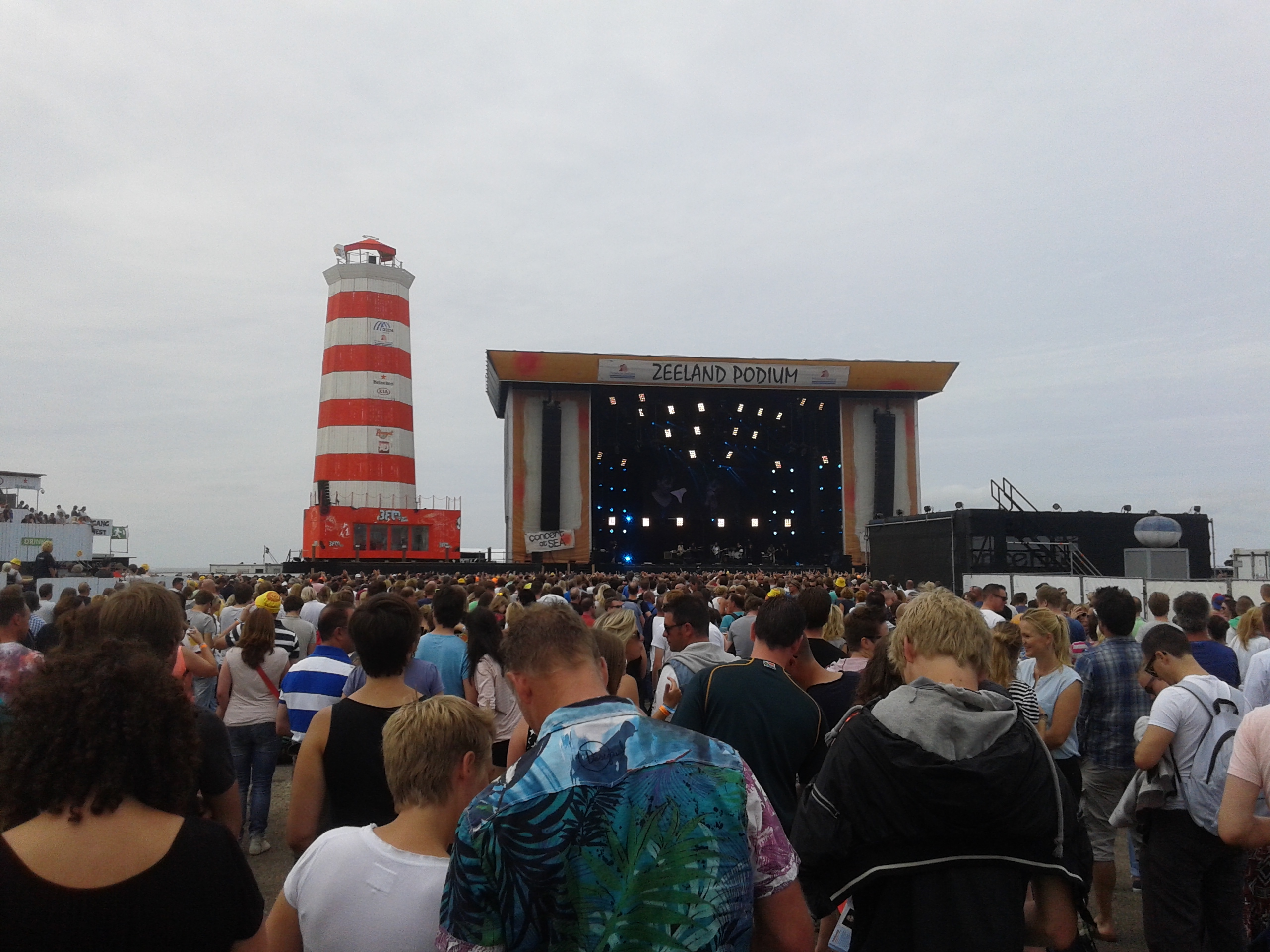
Concert at Sea 2014 edition

Concert at SEA is a pop festival in the Netherlands held every summer (end of June) on the Brouwersdam in the province of Zeeland. It was initiated by the popular Dutch band BLØF. The name of the festival is a mistranslation of the Dutch phrase aan zee meaning by the sea / at the seaside. The first edition was in 2006, after a free pilot concert at that location had proved to be very successful in 2003. Ever since the free pilot, and the first official edition, the festival is held on the Brouwersdam in the province of Zeeland. The first few editions of the event were held in a day, but from 2008, it became a two-day festival that attracts 40,000 people per day.
The second day of the 2011 edition was canceled due to a heavy storm. The 2020 and 2021 editions were canceled due to the COVID-19 pandemic. Instead, the festival was streamed online, called 'Concert at Home'.
