= Closure of tidal inlets =

Man-made coastal barriers against tides

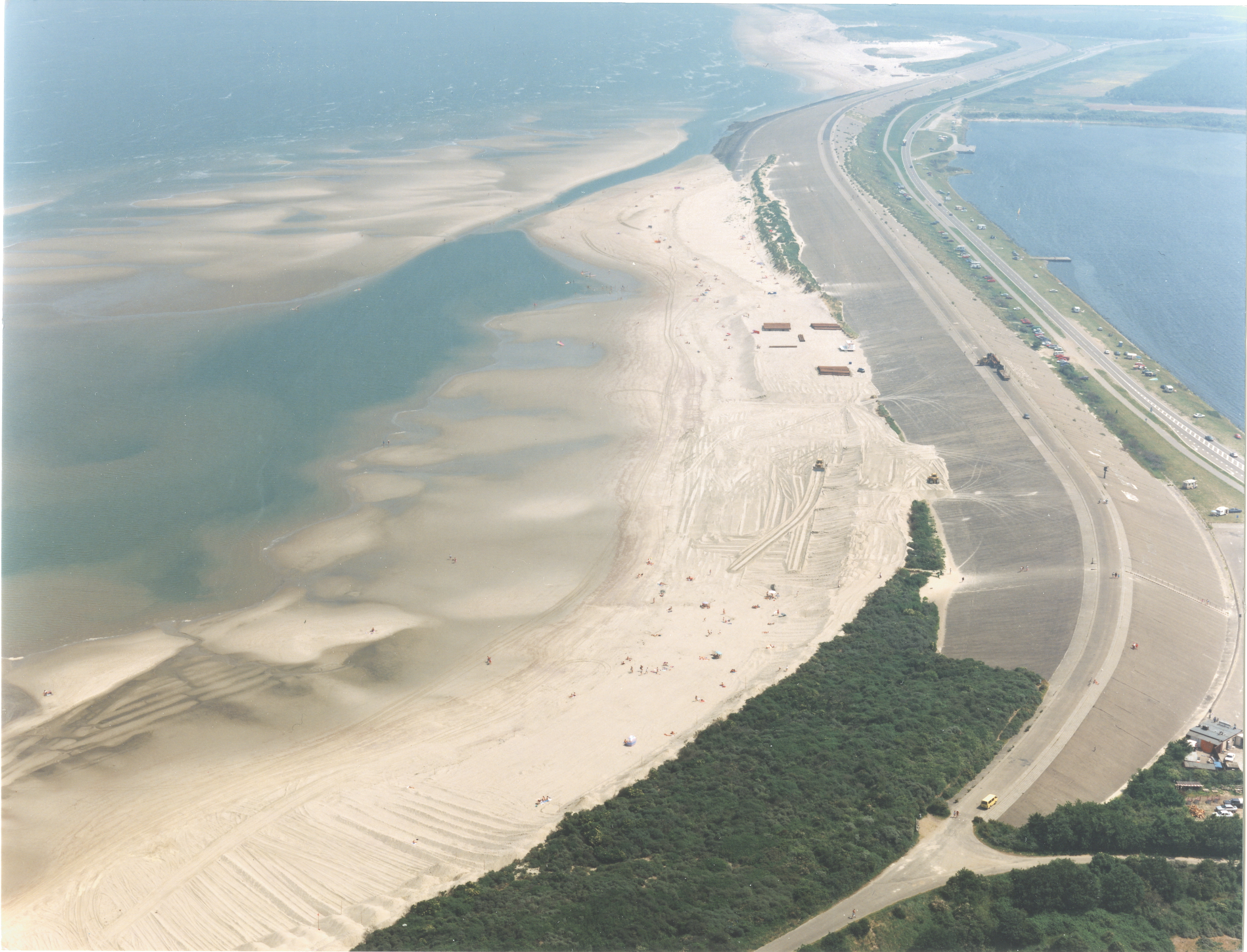
The Veerse Gatdam

In coastal and environmental engineering, the closure of tidal inlets entails the deliberate prevention of the entry of seawater through inlets into inland areas, through the use of fill material and the construction of barriers. The aim of such closures is usually to safeguard inland regions from flooding, thereby protecting ecological integrity and reducing potential harm to human settlements and agricultural areas.

The complexity of inlet closure varies significantly with the size of the estuary involved. For smaller estuaries, which may naturally dry out at low tide, the process can be relatively straightforward. However, the management of larger estuaries demands a sophisticated blend of technical expertise, encapsulating hydrodynamics, sediment transport, as well as mitigation of the potential ecological consequences of such interventions. The development of knowledge around such closures over time reflects a concerted effort to balance flood defence mechanisms with environmental stewardship, leading to the development of both traditional and technologically advanced solutions.

In situations where rivers and inlets pose significant flood risk across large areas, providing protection along the entire length of both banks can be prohibitively expensive. In London, this issue has been addressed by construction of the Thames Barrier, which is only closed during forecasts of extreme water levels in the southern North Sea. In the Netherlands, a number of inlets were closed by fully damming their entrances. Since such dams take many months or years to complete, water exchange between the sea and the inlet continues throughout the construction period. It is only during the final stages that the gap is sufficiently narrowed to limit this exchange, presenting unique construction challenges. As the gap diminishes, significant differences in water levels between the sea and the inlet create very strong currents, potentially reaching several metres per second, through the remaining narrow opening.

Special techniques are required during this critical closure phase to prevent severe erosion of existing defences. Two primary methods are used: the abrupt or sudden closure method, which involves positioning prefabricated caissons during a brief period of slack water, and the gradual closure method, which involves progressively building up the last section of the dam, keeping the crest nearly horizontal to prevent strong currents and erosion along any specific section. Much engineering literature treats "closure works" as the construction phase that stops tidal exchange, distinct from the later conversion of the work into a permanent embankment or sea defence.

== Purpose of a tidal inlet closure ==
The closure of tidal inlets serves various primary purposes:

- Land reclamation
- Shortening sea defence length
- Creation of fresh water reservoirs
- Establishment of tidal energy basins
- Development of fixed-level harbour docks
- Construction of docks for marine activities
- Provision of road or rail connections
- Repair of breaches in dikes
- Creation of fish ponds.

Historically, the closure of inlets was primarily aimed at land reclamation and water level control in marshy areas, facilitating agricultural development. Such activities necessitated effective management of river and storm surge levels, often requiring ongoing dike maintenance. Secondary purposes, such as tidal energy generation, harbour and construction docks, dams for transportation infrastructure, and fish farming, also emerged but had lesser environmental impact.

In contemporary times, driven by a growing emphasis on quality of life, particularly in industrialised nations, inlet closure projects encompass a broader spectrum of objectives. These may include creating freshwater storage facilities, mitigating water pollution in designated zones, providing recreational amenities, and combating saltwater intrusion or groundwater contamination.

=== Side effects ===
Depending on circumstances, various hydrological, environmental, ecological, and economic side effects can be realised by the implementation of a tidal inlet closure, including:

- change of tide (amplitude, flows) at the seaward side of the dam
- change in bar and gully topography, outside the dam
- removal of tides on the inner side of the dam
- change in groundwater level in adjoining areas
- alteration of drainage capacity for adjoining areas
- loss of fish and vegetation species
- loss of breeding and feeding areas for water birds
- rotting processes during change in vegetation and fauna
- stratification of water quality in stagnant reservoir
- accumulation of sediments in the reservoir
- impact on facilities for shipping
- impact on recreation and leisure pursuits
- change in professional occupations (fishery, navigation)
- social and cultural impacts.

== Examples of closure works ==
=== Historical closures in the Netherlands ===
Several towns in the Netherlands bear names ending in "dam," indicating their origin at the site of a dam in a tidal river. Prominent examples include Amsterdam (located at a dam in the Amstel) and Rotterdam (situated at a dam in the Rotte). However, some locations, like Maasdam, have less clear origins. Maasdam, a village situated at the site of a dam on the Maas dating back to before 1300, was the site of the construction of the Grote Hollandse Waard, which was subsequently lost during the devastating St. Elizabeth's Flood of 1421. As a result of the flood, the Maas river is now located far from the village of Maasdam.

One technique widely employed in historical closures was known as opzinken (English: sinking up). This method involved sinking fascine mattresses, filling them with sand, and stabilising them with ballast stone. Successive sections were then sunk on top until the dam reached a height where no further mattresses could be placed. This process effectively reduced the flow, allowing the completion of the dam with sand and clay. For instance, the construction of the Sloedam in 1879, as part of the railway to Middelburg, utilised this technique.

Early observations revealed that during closures, the flow velocity within the closure gap increased, leading to soil erosion. Consequently, measures such as bottom protection around the closing gap were implemented, guided primarily by experiential knowledge rather than precise calculations. Until 1953, closing dike breaches in tidal areas posed challenges due to high current velocities. In such instances, new dikes were constructed further inland, albeit a lengthier process, to mitigate closure difficulties. An extreme example occurred after the devastating North Sea flood of 1953, necessitating the closure of breaches at Schelphoek, marking the last major closure in the Netherlands.

=== Modern dam construction in the Netherlands ===
In recent times, the construction of larger dams in the Netherlands has been driven by both the necessity to protect the hinterlands and the ambition to create new agricultural lands.

The formation of currents at the mouth of an inlet arises from the tidal actions of filling (high tide) and emptying (ebb tide) of the basin. The speed of these currents is influenced by the tidal range, the tidal curve, the volume of the tidal basin (also known as the storage area), and the size of the flow profile at that location. The tidal range varies along the Dutch coast, being minimal near Den Helder (about 1.5 metres) and maximal off the coast of Zeeland (2 to 3 metres), with the range expanding to 4 to 5 metres in the areas behind the Oosterschelde and Westerschelde.

In tidal basins with loosely packed seabeds, current channels emerge and may shift due to the constantly changing directions and speeds of currents. The strongest flows cause scour in the deepest channels, such as in the Oosterschelde where depths can reach up to 45 metres, while sandbanks form between these channels, occasionally becoming exposed at low tide.

The channel systems that naturally develop in tidal areas are generally in a state of approximate equilibrium, balancing flow velocity and the total flow profile. Conversely, when dike breaches are sealed, this equilibrium is often not yet achieved at the time of closure. For instance, rapid intervention in closing numerous breaches following the 1953 storm surge helped limit erosion. For the construction of a dam at the mouth of an inlet, activities are undertaken to reduce the flow profile, potentially leading to increased flow velocities and subsequent scouring unless pre-emptive measures are taken, such as reinforcing the beds and sides of channels with bottom protection. An exception occurs when the surface area of the tidal basin is preliminarily reduced by compartmentalisation dams.

The procedure for closing a tidal channel can generally be segmented into four phases:

1. A preparatory phase with a slight reduction in the flow profile (to 80 to 90% of its original size), during which dam sections are constructed in shallow areas and soil protection is placed in the channels.
2. A sill is then erected, serving as a foundation for the closing dike. This sill can help distribute the dike's pressure on the subsoil and/or act as a filter between the bottom protection and the closing structure. The closure gap at this stage must be wide enough to allow the ebb and flow currents to pass without damaging the sill and the protective measures.
3. The actual closure, where the final gap is sealed.
4. The final phase involves constructing the dike over and around the temporary dam.

Under specific circumstances, alternative construction methods may be applied; for instance, during a sand closure, dumping capacity is utilised in such a manner that more material is added per tide than can be removed by the current, typically negating the need for soil protection.

When the Zuiderzee was enclosed in 1932, it was still possible to manage the current with boulder clay, as the tidal difference there was only about 1 metre, preventing excessively high flow velocities in the closure gap that would require alternative materials. Numerous closure methods have been implemented in the Delta area, on both small and large scales, highly dependent on a variety of preconditions. These include hydraulic and soil mechanical prerequisites, as well as available resources such as materials, equipment, labour, finances, and expertise. Post-World War II, the experiences gained from dike repairs in Walcheren in 1945, the closure of the Brielse Maas in 1950, the Braakman in 1952, and the repair of the breaches after the 1953 storm surge significantly influenced the choice of closure methods for the first Delta dams.

Up until the completion of the Brouwersdam in 1971, the choice of closure method was almost entirely based on technical factors. However, environmental and fisheries considerations became equally vital in the selection of closure methods for the Markiezaatskade near Bergen op Zoom, the Philipsdam, Oesterdam, and the storm surge barrier in the Oosterschelde, taking into account factors like the timing of tidal organism mortality and salinity control during closures, which are critical for determining the initial conditions of the newly formed basin.

Closures in the Deltaworks
Name	Length (m)	Completion Year	Type of Dam	Closure Method
Zandkreek	830	1960	Secondary Dam	Two Closed Caissons
Veerse Gat	2,800	1961	Primary Dam	Sluice Caissons
Grevelingendam	6,000	1965	Compartmentalisation Dam	Cable Car
Volkerakdam	5,000	1969	Compartmentalisation Dam	Sluice Caisson
Brouwersdam	6,000	1971	Primary Dam	Sluice Caissons and Cable Car
Haringvlietdam	5,000	1971	Primary Dam and Discharge Sluice	Cable Car
Oesterdam	10,500	1986	Compartmentalisation Dam	Sand Closure
Philipsdam	6,000	1987	Compartmentalisation Dam	Sand Closure

=== Closures in Germany ===
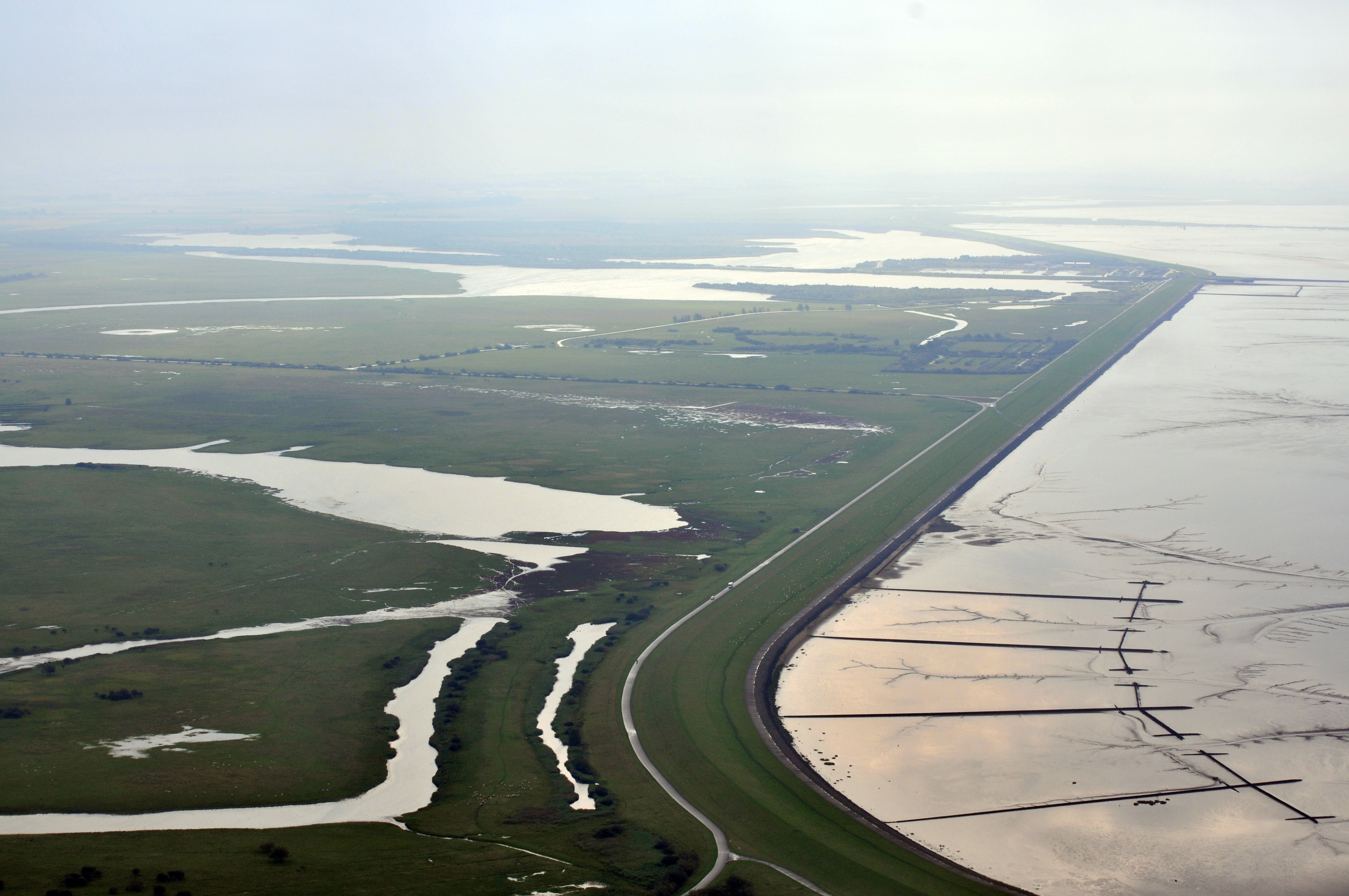
The reclaimed land following the closures at Meldorf

In the north-west of Germany, a series of closure works have been implemented. Initially, the primary aims of these closures were land reclamation and protection against flooding. Subsequently, the focus shifted towards safety and ecological conservation. Closures took place in Meldorf (1978), Nordstrander Bucht (Husum, 1987), and Leyhörn (Greetsiel, 1991).

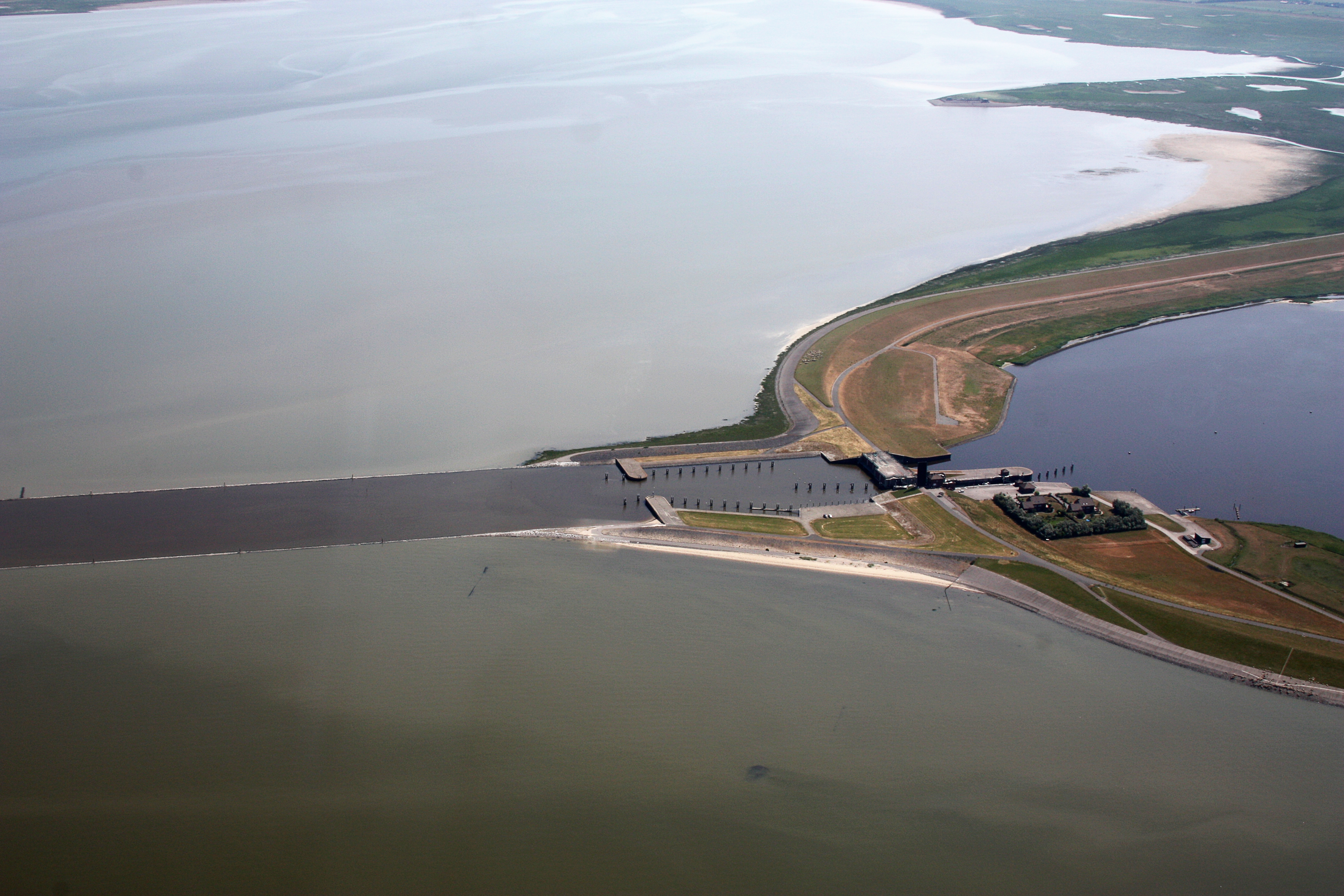
The lock and discharge sluice in the Leybucht

Around 1975, evolving global perspectives on ecological significance led to a change in the approach to closures. As a result, in northern Germany, several closures were executed differently from their original designs. For instance, while there were plans to completely dam the Leybucht near Greetsiel, only a minor portion was ultimately closed—just enough to meet safety and water management requirements. This made the closure of the remaining area no longer a technical challenge. A discharge sluice and navigation lock were constructed, providing adequate capacity to mitigate currents in the closure gap of the dam.

=== Closures in South Korea ===
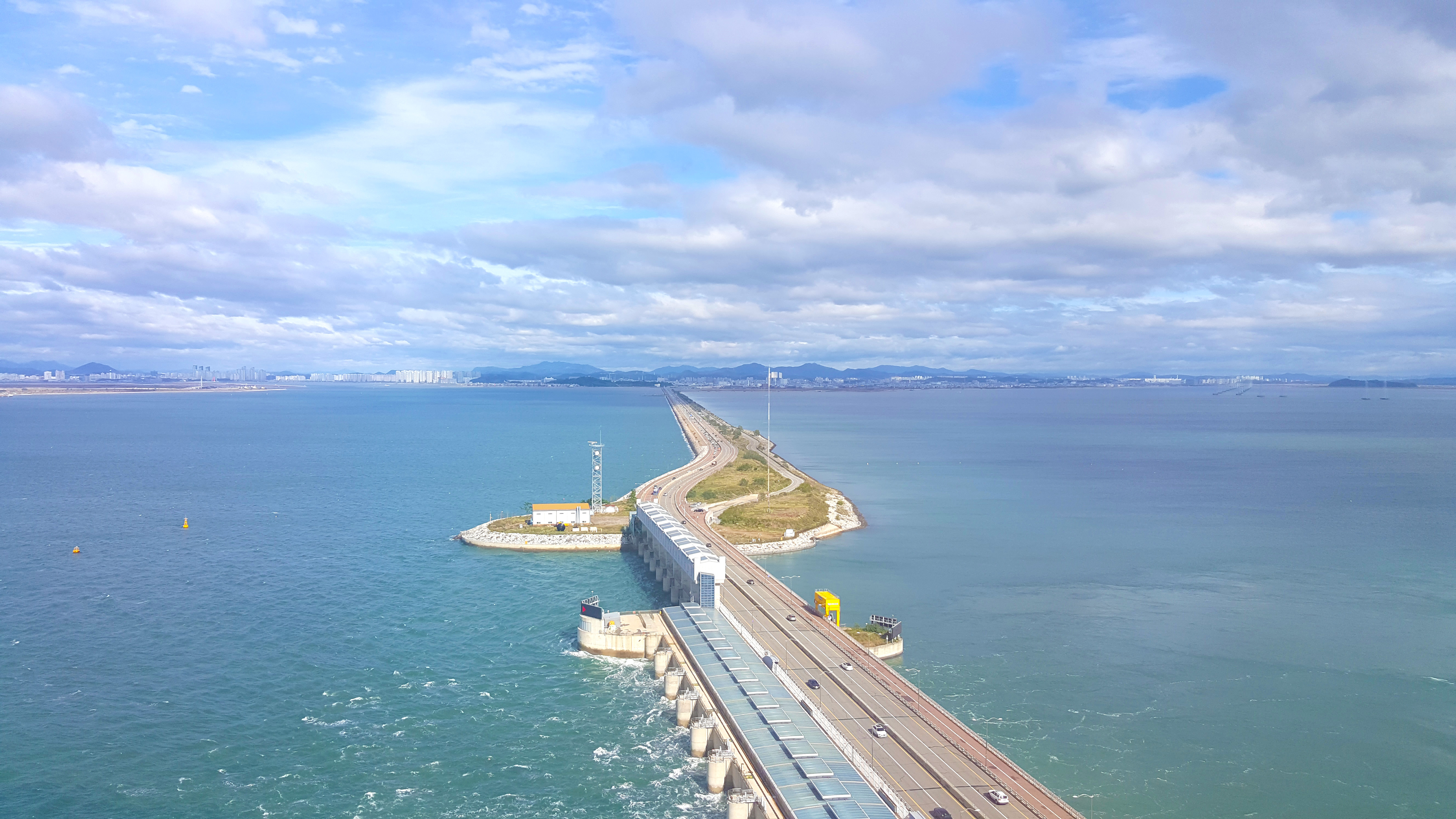
Sihwa Dam

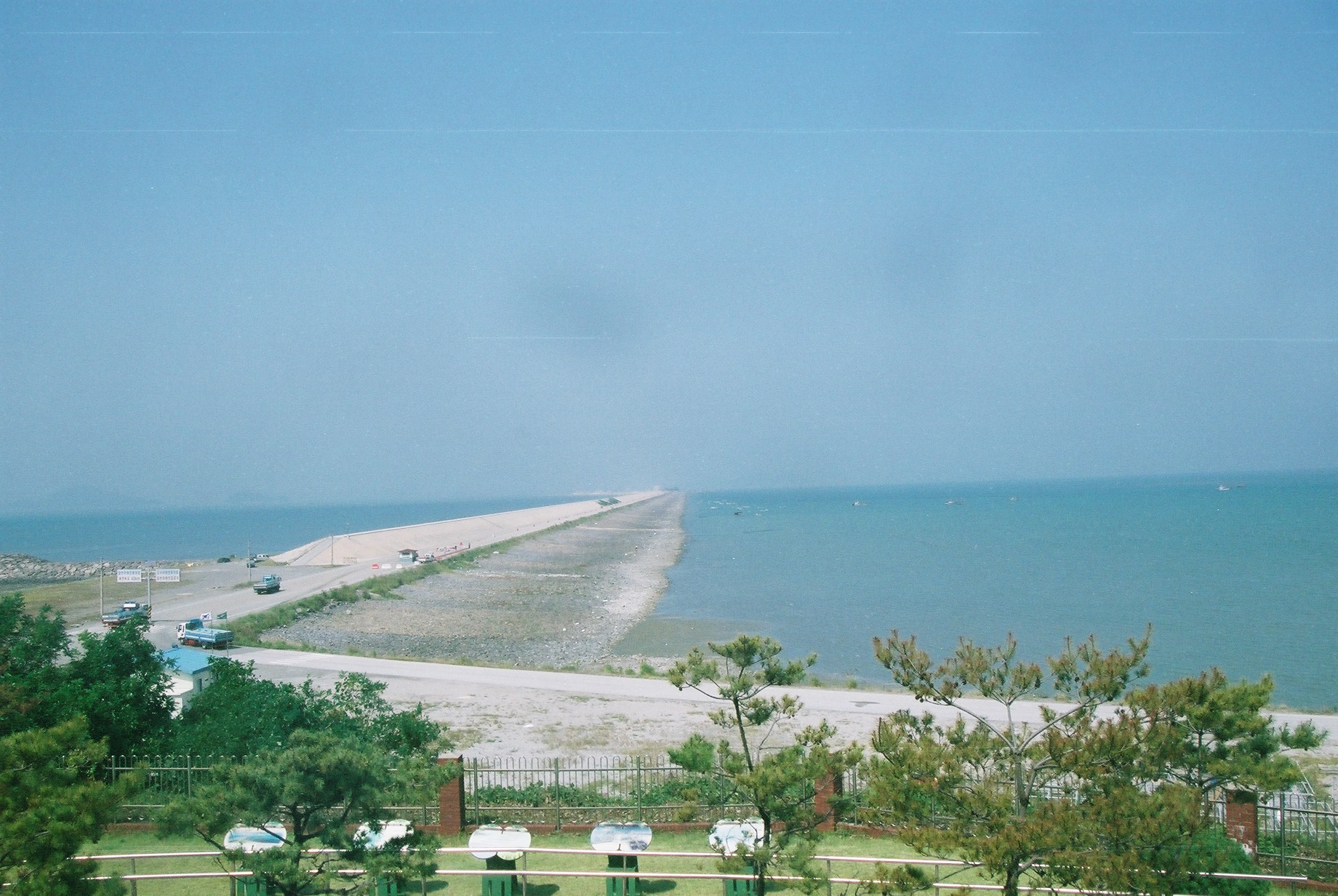
Saemangeum Seawall

In the 1960s, South Korea faced a significant shortage of agricultural land, prompting plans for large reclamation projects, including the construction of closure dams. These projects were carried out between 1975 and 1995, incorporating the expertise and experience from the Netherlands. Over time, attitudes towards closure works in South Korea evolved, leading to considerable delays and modifications in the plans for the Hwaong and Saemangeum projects.

Recent Closures in Korea
Name	Length (km)	Tidal Range (m)	Area (km^{2})	Closing Date
Saemangeum	29	7.0	400	April 2006
Hwaong	19	9.4	62	March 2002
Sihwa	13	9.3	173	January 1994
Sukmun	11	9.4	37	November 1991
Busa	3	7.5	13	March 1988
Yongsan	4	5.6	10	February 1983
Sabkyo	3	10.4	28	March 1977

=== Closures in Bangladesh ===
Creeks have been closed to facilitate the creation of agricultural land and provide protection against floods in Bangladesh for many years. The combination of safeguarding against flooding, the need for agricultural land, and the availability of irrigation water served as the driving forces behind these initiatives. Prior to 1975, such closure works were relatively modest in scale. Some early examples include:

Early Closure Works in Bangladesh
Site	Gap Width (m)	Channel Depth (m)	Execution Time (Manual Labour)	Tidal Range (m)
Gangrail	125	11	?	3.0
Koyra River	90	??	90 days	3.0
Unnamed	245	8.5	80 days	2.5
Amtali Creek	130	7.5	one month	2.7

The approach to closures in Bangladesh did not significantly differ from practices elsewhere. However, due to the country's low labour costs and high unemployment rates, methods employing extensive local manpower were preferred.

These works primarily utilised a type of locally developed fascine rolls known as mata. The final gaps were closed swiftly within a single tidal cycle. Notably, the Gangrail closure failed twice.

In the years 1977/78, the Madargong creek was closed, safeguarding an agricultural area of 20,000 hectares. At the closure site, the creek spanned a width of 150 metres with a depth of 6 metres below mean sea level. The following year, 1978/79, saw the closure of the Chakamaya Khal, featuring a tidal prism of 10 million cubic metres, a tidal range of 3.3 metres, spanning 210 metres in width and 5 metres in depth.

In 1985, the Feni River was dammed to create an irrigation reservoir covering 1,200 hectares. The project was distinctive in its explicit request for the utilisation of local products and manual labour. The 1,200-metre-wide gap needed to be sealed during a neap tide. On the day of the closure, 12,000 workers placed 10,000 bags within the gap.

In 2020, the Nailan dam, originally constructed in the 1960s, experienced a breach that necessitated repair. At the time, the basin covered an area of 480 hectares, with a tidal range varying from 2.5 to 4 metres (neap tide to spring tide). The breach spanned a width of 500 metres, with a tidal prism of 7 million cubic metres. The closure was accomplished by deploying a substantial quantity of geobags, weighing up to 250 kg, though the majority of the bags in the core were 50 kg. The gap was progressively narrowed to 75 metres, the width of the final closure gap, which was sealed in one tidal cycle during a neap tide. To facilitate this, two rows of palisades were erected in the gap, and bags were used to fill the space between them, effectively creating a cofferdam.

== Types of closures ==
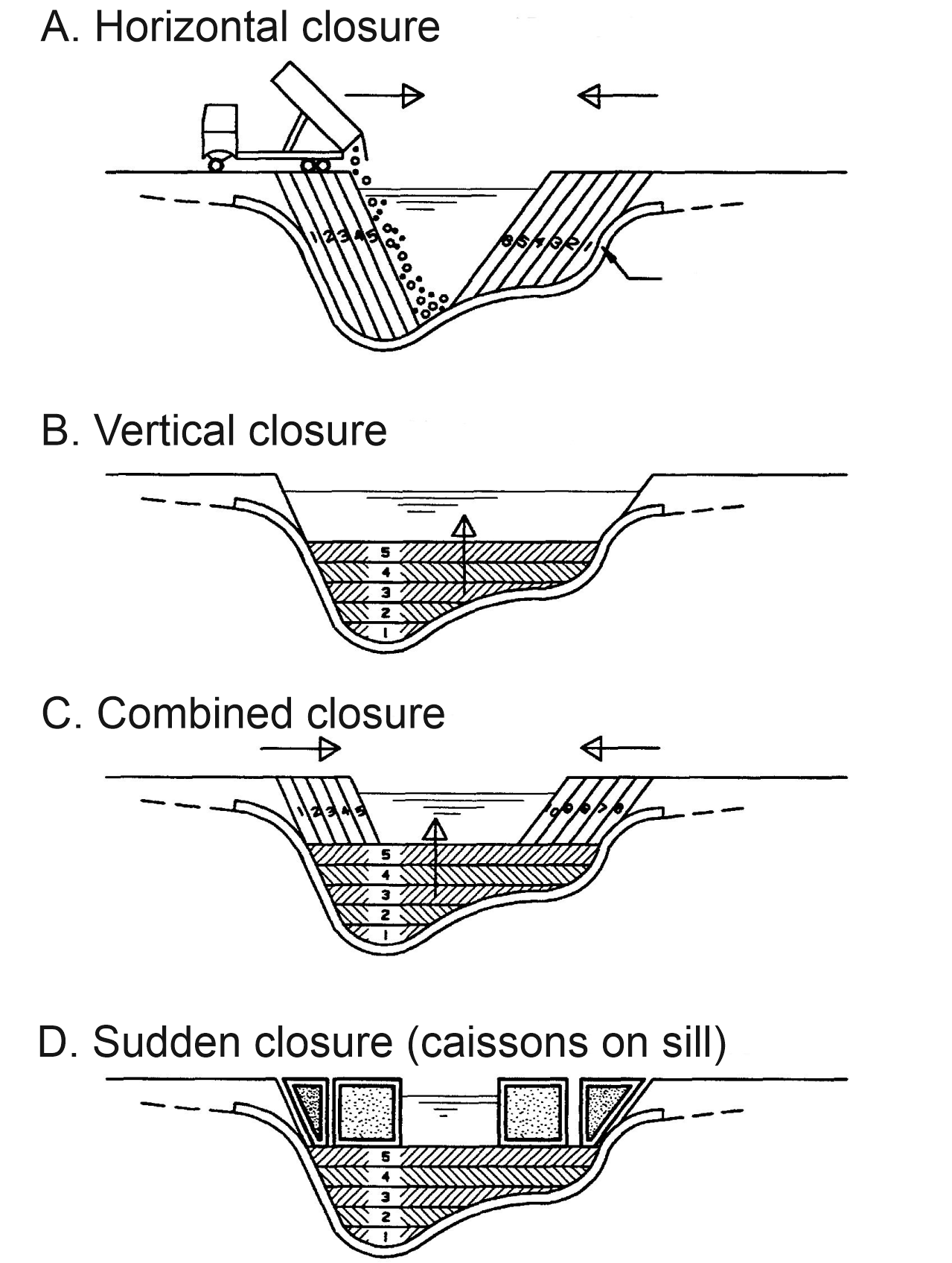
Basic Methods of Closure

Closing methods can be categorized into two principal groups: gradual closures and sudden closures. Within gradual closures, four distinct methods are identified: horizontal closure without a significant sill (a), vertical closure (b), horizontal closure with a sill (c), and sand closures. Sand closures further differentiate into horizontal and vertical types. Sudden closures are typically achieved through the deployment of (sluice) caissons, often positioned on a sill (d). A main distinction is by construction method: gradual (horizontal, vertical, or combined) versus sudden (typically using caissons). Additional naming conventions reflect topography (tidal gully vs. tidal flat closures) and hydrological setting (tidal-basin closure, partial tidal closure, or non-tidal river closure).

== The technology of closure works ==
The challenge in sealing a sea inlet lies in the phenomenon that as the flow area of the closure gap decreases due to the construction of the dam, the flow speed within this gap increases. This acceleration can become so significant that the material deposited into the gap is immediately washed away, leading to the failure of the closure. Therefore, accurately calculating the flow rate is crucial. Given that the length of the basin is usually small relative to the length of the tidal wave, this calculation can typically be performed using a storage area approach (for more details, see the end of this page). This methodology enables the creation of straightforward graphs depicting the velocities within a closure gap throughout the closure process.

== Stone closures ==
=== Horizontal stone closures ===
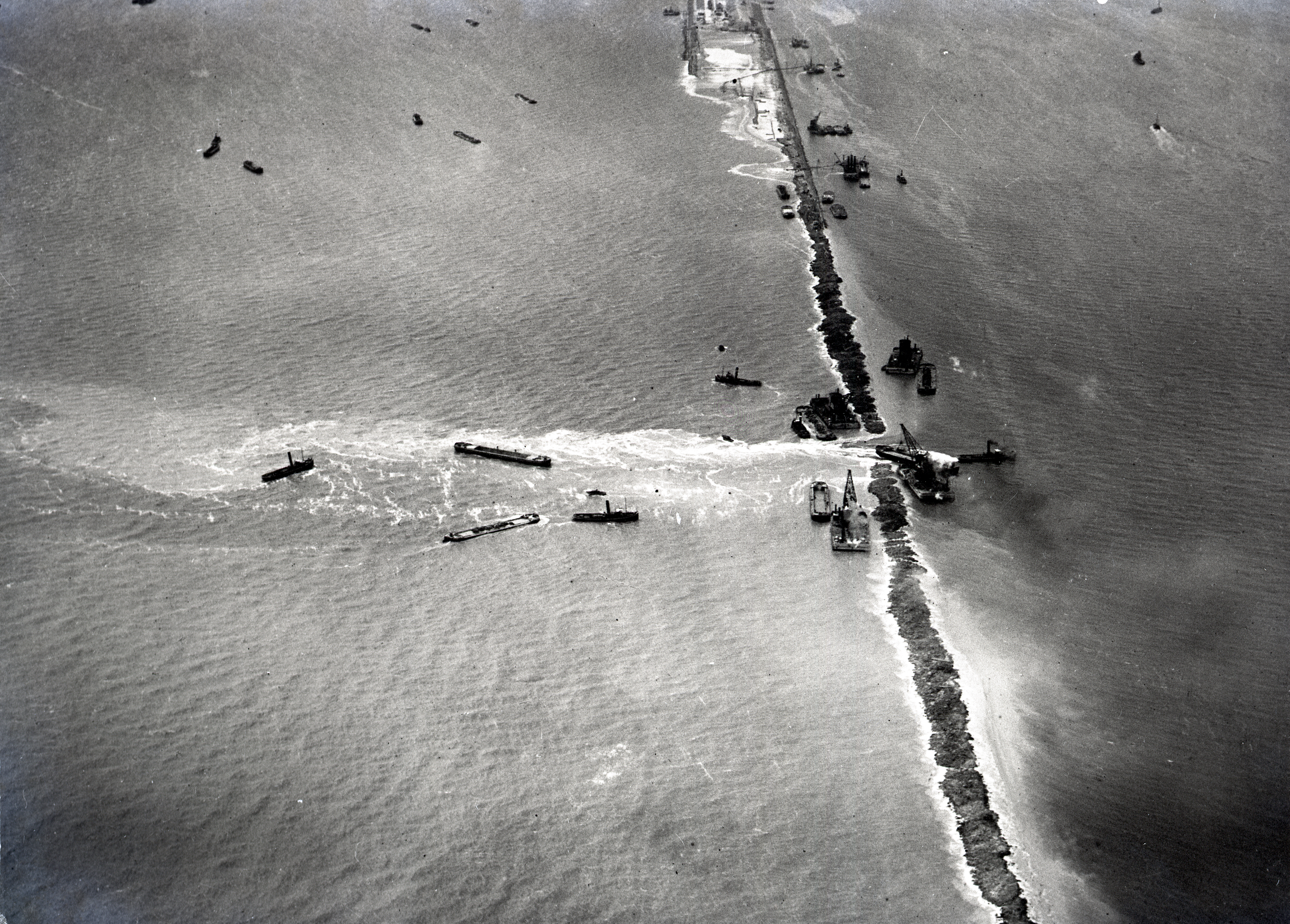
Closing gap De Vlieter in the Afsluitdijk (1932)

In the technique of horizontal stone closures, stone is deployed from both sides into the closing gap. The stone must be heavy enough to counter the increased velocity that results from the reduced flow profile. An added complication is the creation of turbulent eddies, which lead to further scouring of the seabed. It is therefore critical to lay a foundation of stone prior to commencing the closure. The closure of the Zuiderzee in 1932, as depicted in the attached photograph, vividly illustrates the downstream turbulence at the closing gap. Notably, during the Afsluitdijk closure, boulder clay was utilised in a manner akin to stone, which circumvented the need for costly imports of armourstone.

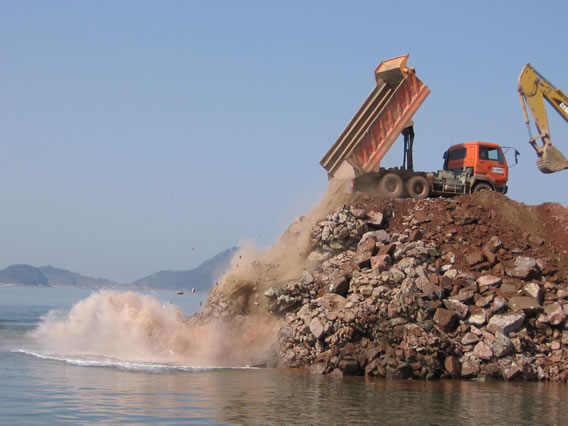
Dumping armourstone during a horizontal closure (Saemangeum, Korea)

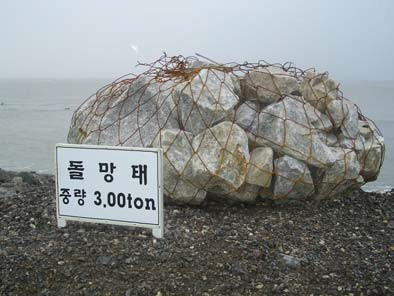
Armourstone in a net used in the closure of the Saemangeum estuary

In the Netherlands, horizontal stone closures have been relatively uncommon due to the high costs associated with armourstone and the prerequisite soil protection. Conversely, in countries where stone is more affordable and soils are less prone to erosion, horizontal stone closures are more frequently employed. A notable instance of this method was the closure of the Saemangeum estuary in South Korea, where a scarcity of heavy stone led to the innovative use of stone packed in steel nets as dumping material. The logistical challenges of transporting and deploying stone, especially within the constraints of a tight timeframe to prevent excessive bottom erosion, often pose significant challenges. Field measurements show that peak velocities occur just downstream of the narrowing gap, which means scour protection is usually required there.

=== Vertical stone closures ===
From a hydraulic perspective, vertical closures are preferable due to their reduced turbulence and consequent minimisation of soil erosion issues. However, their implementation is more complex. For parts of the dam submerged underwater, stone dumpers (either bottom or side dumpers) can be employed. Yet, this becomes impractical for the final segments due to insufficient navigational depth. Two alternatives exist: the construction of an auxiliary bridge or the use of a cable car.

==== Auxiliary bridge ====
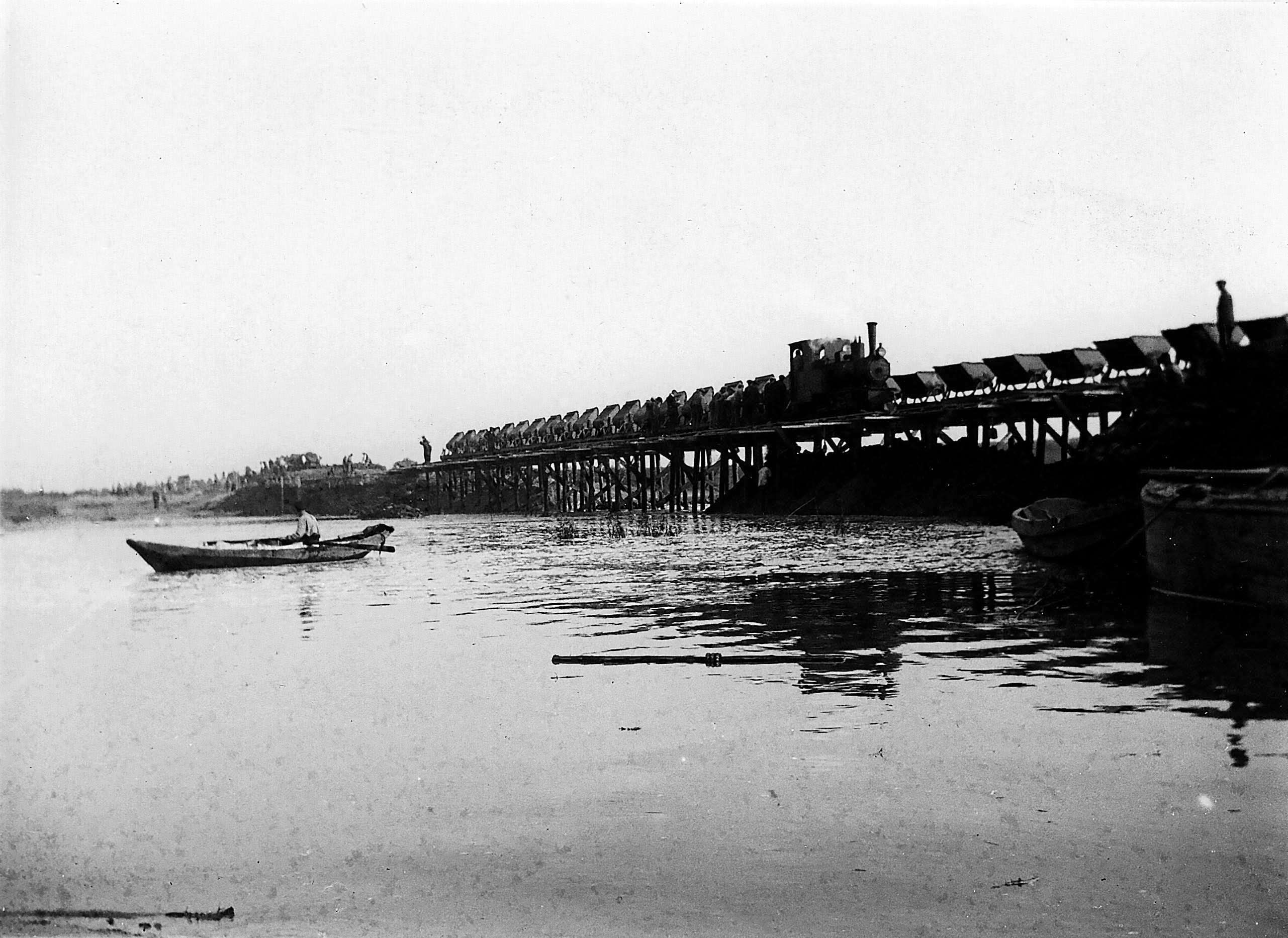
Closure of the dike around Polder De Biesbosch with a bridge and tipping carts

An auxiliary bridge allows armourstone to be directly deposited into the closing gap. This method was contemplated for the Delta Works' Oesterdam closure but was ultimately deemed more expensive than sand closure. In the Netherlands, such a technique was applied during the closure of the dike around De Biesbosch polder in 1926, where a temporary bridge facilitated the dumping of materials into the gap using tipping carts propelled by a steam locomotive.

==== Cable car ====
Constructing an auxiliary bridge for larger and deeper closing gaps can be exceedingly cumbersome, leading to the preference for cable cars in the Delta Works closures. The first application of a cable car was for the northern gap of the Grevelingendam, serving as a trial to gather insights for subsequent larger closures like the Brouwershavense Gat and the Oosterschelde.

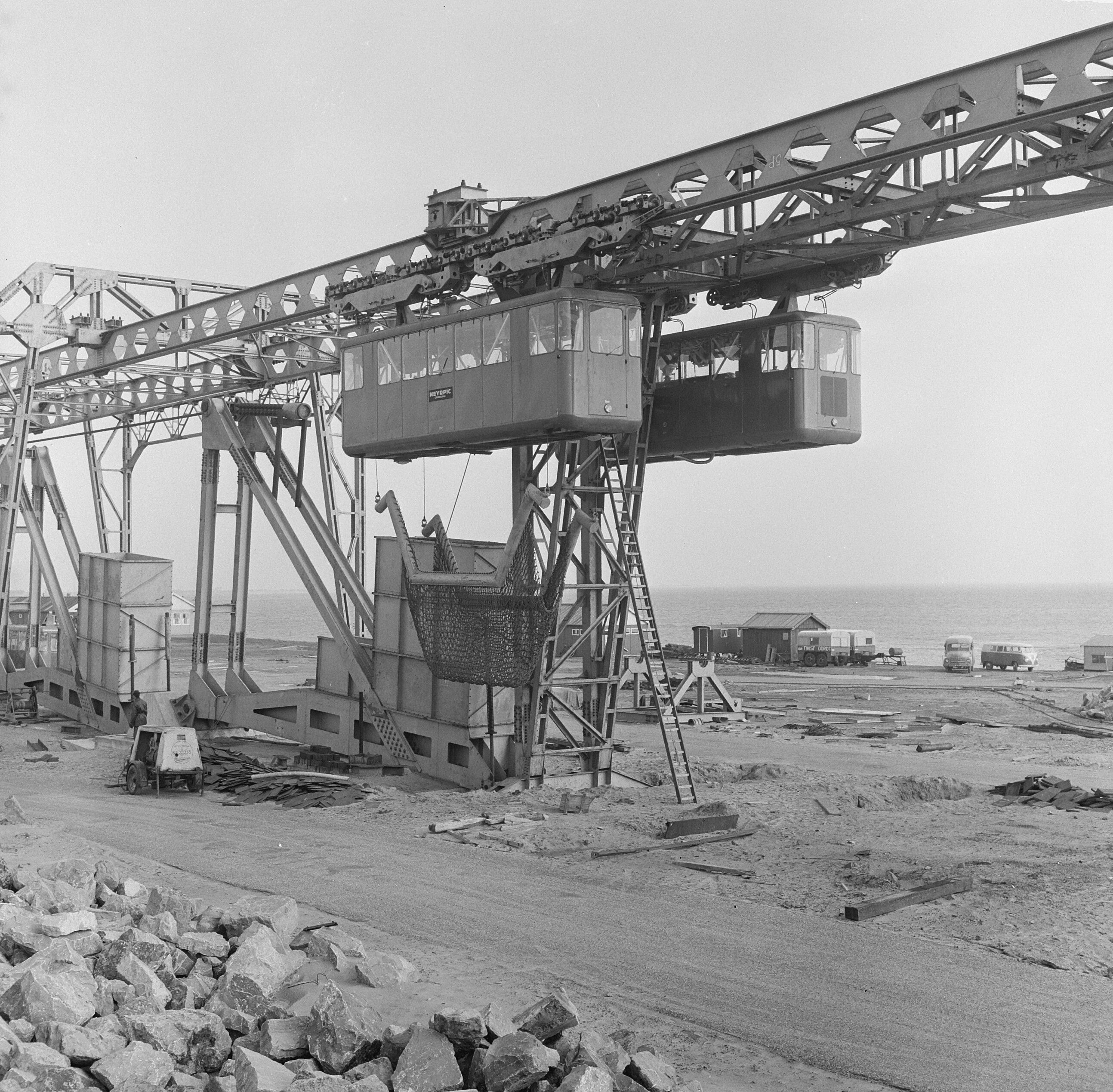
Closure of the Grevelingendam

Stone transport via cable involved wagons with independent propulsion, enhancing transport capacity through one-way traffic. The system's design, a collaboration between Rijkswaterstaat and French company Neyrpic, minimized malfunction risks across the network. The 'blondin automoteur continu' type cable car spanned approximately 1200 m, with a continuous track supported by two carrying cables and terminal turntables for wagon transfer. Initially, stone was transported in steel bottom-unloading containers, later supplemented by steel nets, allowing for a dumping rate of 360 tons per hour.

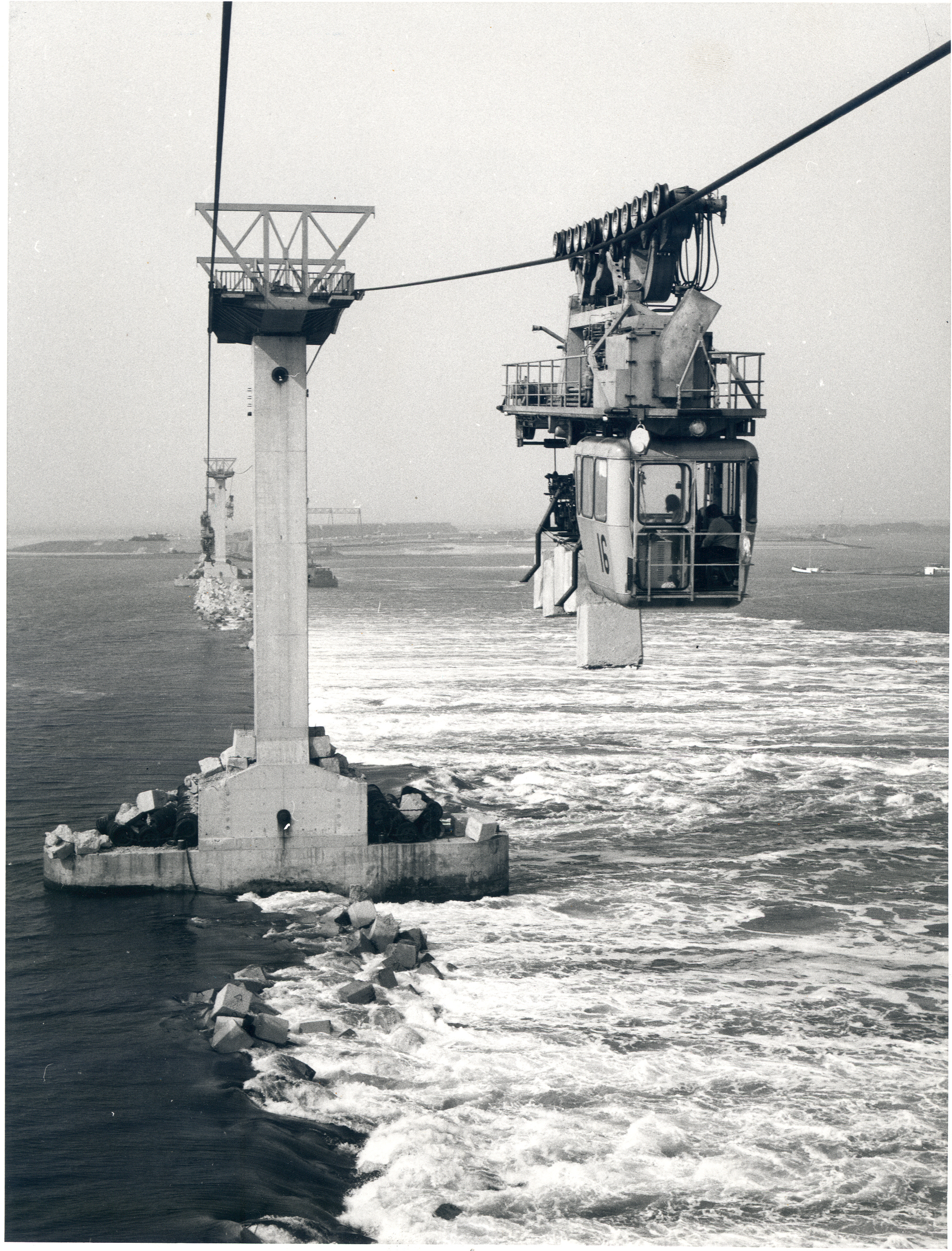
Brouwersdam cable car closure with 2500 kg concrete blocks

However, the system's loading capacity proved insufficient, prompting a switch to 1 m^{3} (2500 kg) concrete blocks for subsequent closures (Haringvliet and Brouwersdam). Although planned for the Oosterschelde closure, a policy shift led to the construction of a storm surge barrier instead, foregoing the use of the cable car for this purpose.

== Sand closure ==
Beyond the use of armourstone, closures can also be achieved solely with sand. This method necessitates a substantial dredging capacity. In the Netherlands, sand closures have been successfully implemented in various projects, including the Oesterdam, the Philipsdam, and the construction of the Second Maasvlakte.

=== Principles of a sand closure ===
Sand closures involve employing a dumping capacity within the closure gap that introduces more material per tidal cycle than can be removed by the current. Unlike stone closures, the material used here is inherently unstable under the flow velocities encountered. Typically, sand closures do not necessitate soil protection. This, among other reasons, makes sand closure a cost-effective solution when locally sourced sand is utilized. Since 1965, numerous tidal channels have been effectively sealed using sand, aided by the rapidly increasing capabilities of modern sand suction dredgers.

These advancements have enabled quick and voluminous sand delivery for larger closures, tolerating sand losses during the closing phase of up to 20 to 50%. The initial sand closures of tidal channels — including the Ventjagersgatje in 1959 and the southern entrance to the Haringvliet bridge in 1961 — contributed to the development of a basic calculation method for sand closures. Subsequent sand closures provided practical validation for this method, refining predictions of sand losses.

=== Selected sand closures ===
The following table outlines several channels that have been closed using sand, illustrating the technique's application and effectiveness.

Data from some sand closures in NW Europe
Project	Year	Surface (km^{2})	Closing Hole Width (m)	Area of Closing Hole (m^{2})	Tidal Range (m)	Max. Speed (m/s)	Closing Duration (Hours)	Number of Dredges	Average Sand Production (m³/hr)	Max. Sand Production (m³/hr)	Sand Loss (million m³)	Avg. Erosion (m³/hr)	Grain Size (mm)
Volkerak Southern Landhead	1961	N/A	N/A	1,600	2.10	1.75	430	N/A	N/A	N/A	0.9	N/A	N/A
Brielse Gat	1966	0.8	1720	390	2.2	2.3	36	2	310	10,500	0.05	6	160
Brielse Gat Side Channel	1966	1.57	1820	1,120	2.2	2.9	63	2	1,140	20,000	0.43	12	160
Oste (Channel of Elbe)	1968	N/A	300	N/A	N/A	1.5	N/A	N/A	1,500	3,300	N/A	N/A	90
Zuidwal, Lauwerszee	1968	N/A	3400	N/A	N/A	N/A	N/A	N/A	N/A	N/A	N/A	N/A	150
Haringliet South (Noord Pampus)	1968	2.43	N/A	N/A	N/A	1.3	37	2	N/A	N/A	0.22	N/A	135
Brouwersdam	1969	4.2	N/A	N/A	N/A	N/A	66	3	N/A	N/A	0.25	N/A	200
Eider Dam	1972	N/A	3200 + 1200	N/A	N/A	N/A	N/A	N/A	1	N/A	N/A	N/A	160
Oosterschelde Dam Section Channel	1972	N/A	2000	N/A	N/A	0.8	25	3	N/A	N/A	0.05	N/A	150
Meldorf Wöhrdenerloch	1978	1.7	1500	1,150	3.2	2.5	N/A	N/A	N/A	10,500	N/A	6	350-90
Krammer	1987	N/A	1100	5,580	2.24-0.5	2.2	6.5	N/A	14,700	22,000	N/A	7.1	200
Tholense Gat	1986	N/A	355	1,350	1.1	2.5	3	N/A	5,300	11,000	N/A	2.5	160
Maasvlakte 2 (Compartment)	2012	0.26	150	225	0.9	N/A	1	N/A	N/A	4,600	17	N/A	380
Maasvlakte 2	2012	0.51	150	N/A	0.9	N/A	1	3	N/A	7,100	12	N/A	280

Note: Several compartments did not encompass fully enclosed basins, making a surface area metric inapplicable.

During the closure of the Geul at the mouth of the Oosterschelde—characterised by a tidal capacity of roughly 30 million cubic metres and a maximum depth of 10 metres below mean sea level (MSL)—the Oosterschelde dam between the working islands of Noordland and Neeltje Jans in 1972 witnessed minimised sand losses thanks to the employment of high-capacity suction dredging. This strategy achieved a sand extraction rate exceeding 500,000 cubic metres per week, distributed across three suction dredgers. It was also demonstrated that initiating the closure from one side and progressing towards the shallowest part of the gap effectively reduces sand losses. This approach ensured the shortest possible distance for the sand to be deposited towards the closure's culmination, particularly during periods of maximum flow velocity.

This technique partly accounts for the significant sand losses, approximately 45%, observed during the closure of the Brielse Gat, which has a maximum depth of 2 metres below MSL and where sand was deposited from both sides towards the centre. Opting for a single sand deposit site, while reducing sand losses, necessitates substantial suction capacity and results in a notably wider closure dam to accommodate all discharge pipelines.

=== Designing sand closures ===
A defining feature of sand closures is the movement and subsequent loss of the construction material. The principle underpinning a sand closure relies on the production of more sand than what is lost during the process. Sand losses occur daily under average flow conditions through the closing gap, contingent upon the flow dynamics. In the context of "strength and load," the "strength" of a sand closure is represented by its production capacity, while the "load" is the resultant loss. A closure is deemed successful when the production exceeds the loss, leading to a gradual narrowing of the closing gap.

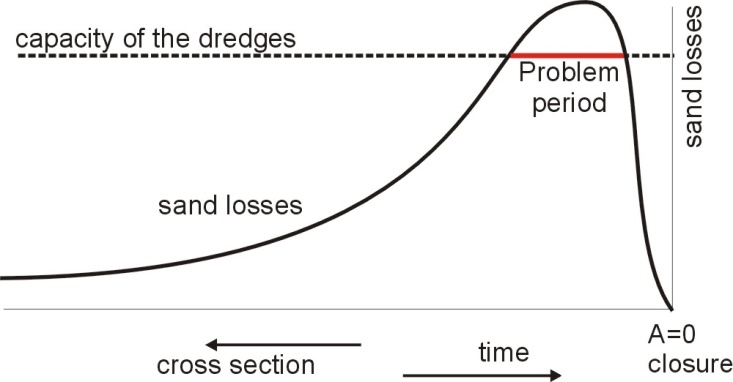
Dredge Capacity vs. Sand Losses

The production capacity, which includes a sufficiently large extraction site for the sand, must surpass the maximum anticipated loss during the closure operation. Consequently, the feasibility study for a (complete) sand closure must initially concentrate on identifying the phase associated with maximum losses. Employing hydraulic boundary conditions, the sand loss for each closure phase can be calculated and depicted graphically as illustrated. The horizontal axis in the diagram represents the closing gap's size, indicating that the depicted capacity is insufficient for a sand closure under these conditions.

A sand closure becomes viable if sufficient sand production can be sustained near the closure gap to overcome the phase with the highest losses. The essential criterion is that the average tidal loss remains lower than the production. However, considerable uncertainties exist in both the calculated losses and the anticipated production, necessitating careful attention. The loss curve, as a function of the closing gap area, typically exhibits a single peak. The maximal loss is usually found when the closing gap area is between 0 and 30% of its initial size. Hence, initial loss calculations can be restricted to this range of closing gap sizes.

Interestingly, the peak sand loss does not coincide with the near completion of the closure gap. Despite potentially high flow velocities, the eroded width of the closing hole is minimal, thus keeping overall sand losses low. Hydraulic boundary conditions can be determined using a storage/area approach.

In general, sand closures are theoretically feasible for maximum flow velocities up to approximately 2.0 to 2.5 m/s. Beyond these velocities, achieving a sand closure becomes virtually impossible due to the resulting flow rates, which are influenced by the reference flow rate U_{0} and the discharge coefficient μ. The discharge coefficient μ is affected by both friction and deceleration losses within the closing gap, with friction losses being notably significant due to the large dimensions of the sand dams. Consequently, the choice of gradient measurement distance significantly impacts the discharge coefficient, which exhibits considerable variability. However, this variability diminishes during the crucial final phase of the closure, where a value of 0.9 is recommended as a reasonable upper limit for the discharge coefficient. The actual flow velocity within the closing gap is determined by applying the storage area approach, adjusted by the discharge coefficient.

== Sudden closures (caissons) ==
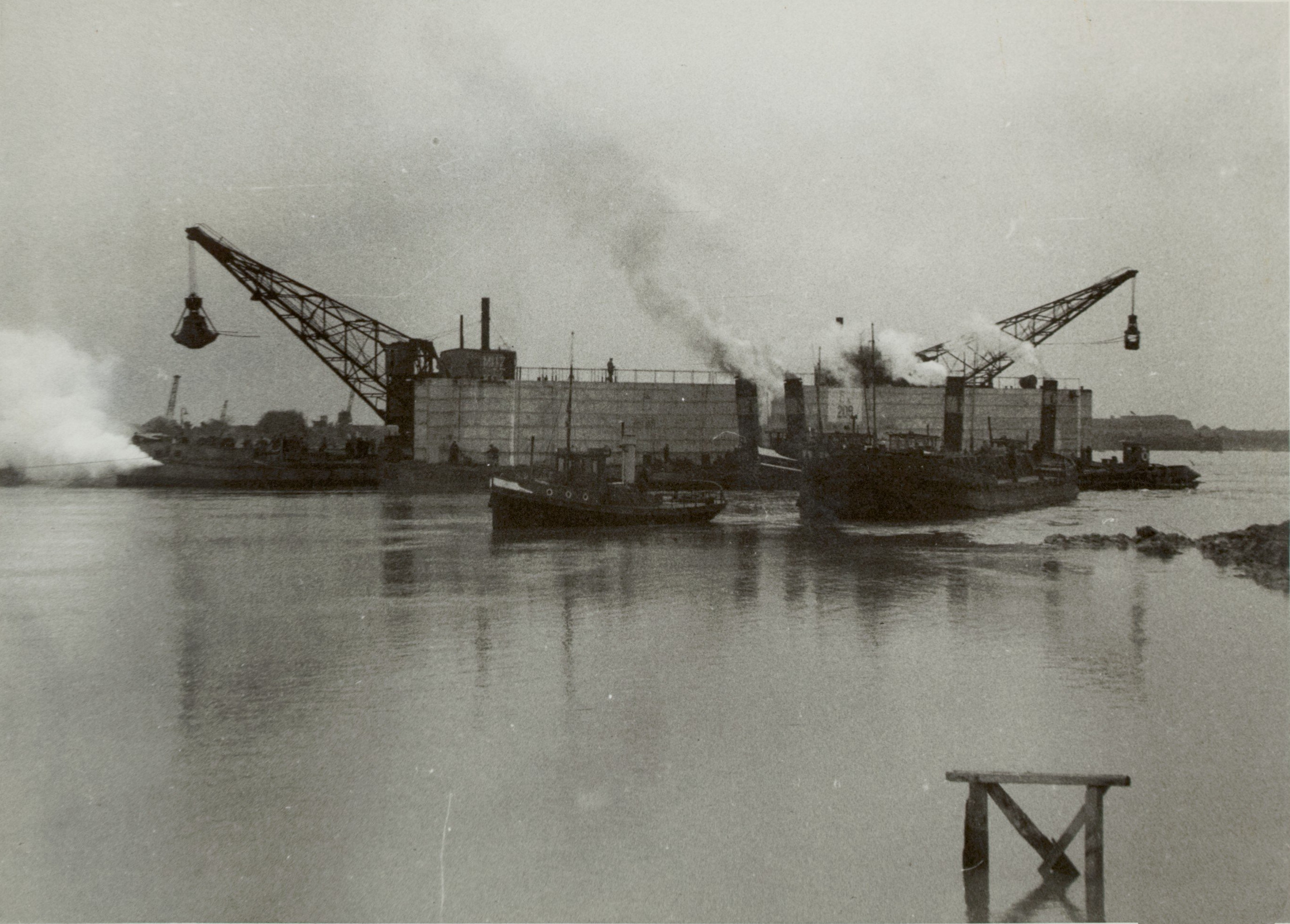
Phoenix caissons at Fort Rammekens

A sudden closure involves the rapid sealing of a tidal inlet or breach in a dike. This is typically prepared in such a manner that the gap can be entirely closed in one swift action during slack tide. The use of caissons or sluice caissons is common, though other unique methods, such as sandbags or ships, have also been employed. Caissons were initially utilized as an emergency response for sealing dike breaches post the Allied Battle of Walcheren in 1944 and subsequently after the 1953 North Sea flood. This technique has since been refined and applied in the Delta Works projects.

=== Caisson closure ===
A caisson closure involves sealing the gap with a caisson, essentially a large concrete box. This method was first applied in the Netherlands for mending dike breaches resulting from Allied assaults on Walcheren in 1944. The following year, at Rammekens, surplus caissons (Phoenix caissons) sourced from England, originally used for constructing the Mulberry harbours post-Normandy landings by Allied troops, were repurposed for dike repairs.

In the aftermath of the 1953 storm disaster, the closure of numerous breaches with caissons was contemplated. Given the uncertainty surrounding the final sizes of the gaps and the time-consuming nature of caisson construction, a decision was made shortly after February 1, 1953, to pre-fabricate a considerable quantity of relatively small caissons. These were strategically employed across various sites, and later, within the Delta Works.

A limited supply of larger Phoenix caissons from the Mulberry harbours was also utilized for sealing a few extensive dike breaches, notably at Ouwerkerk and Schelphoek.

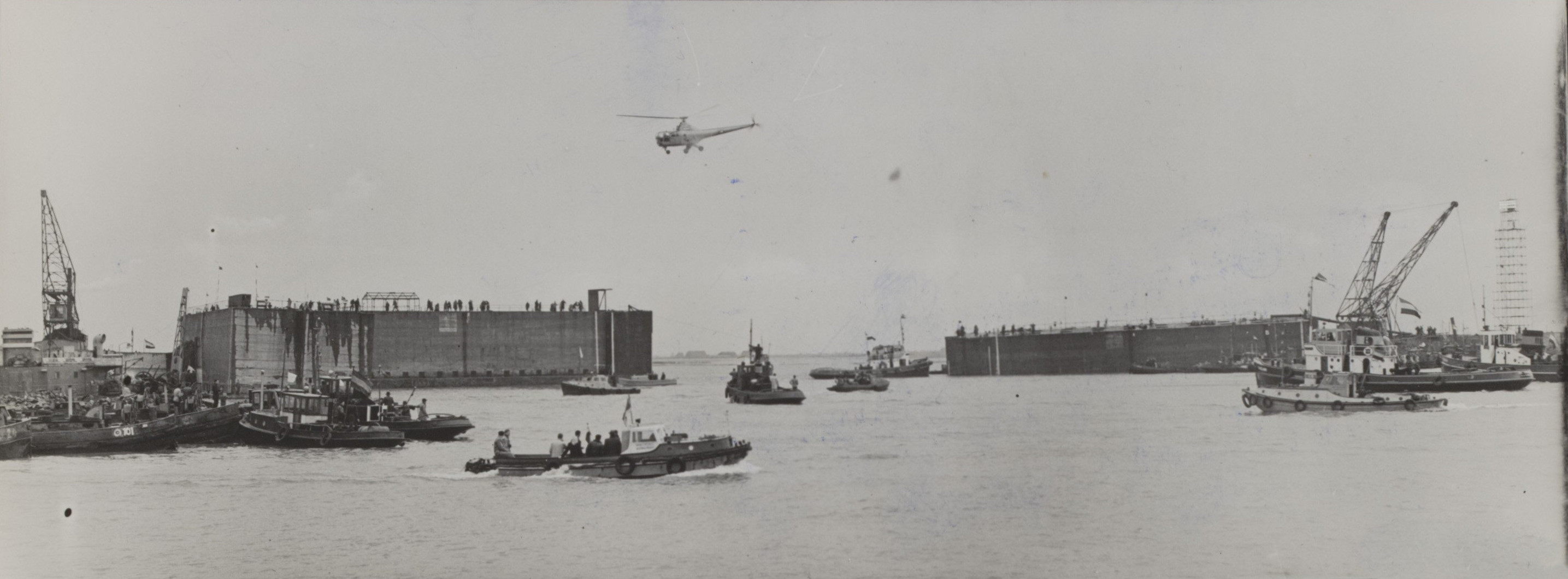
The 1953 closure using Phoenix caissons near Ouwerkerk.

==== Placing a caisson ====
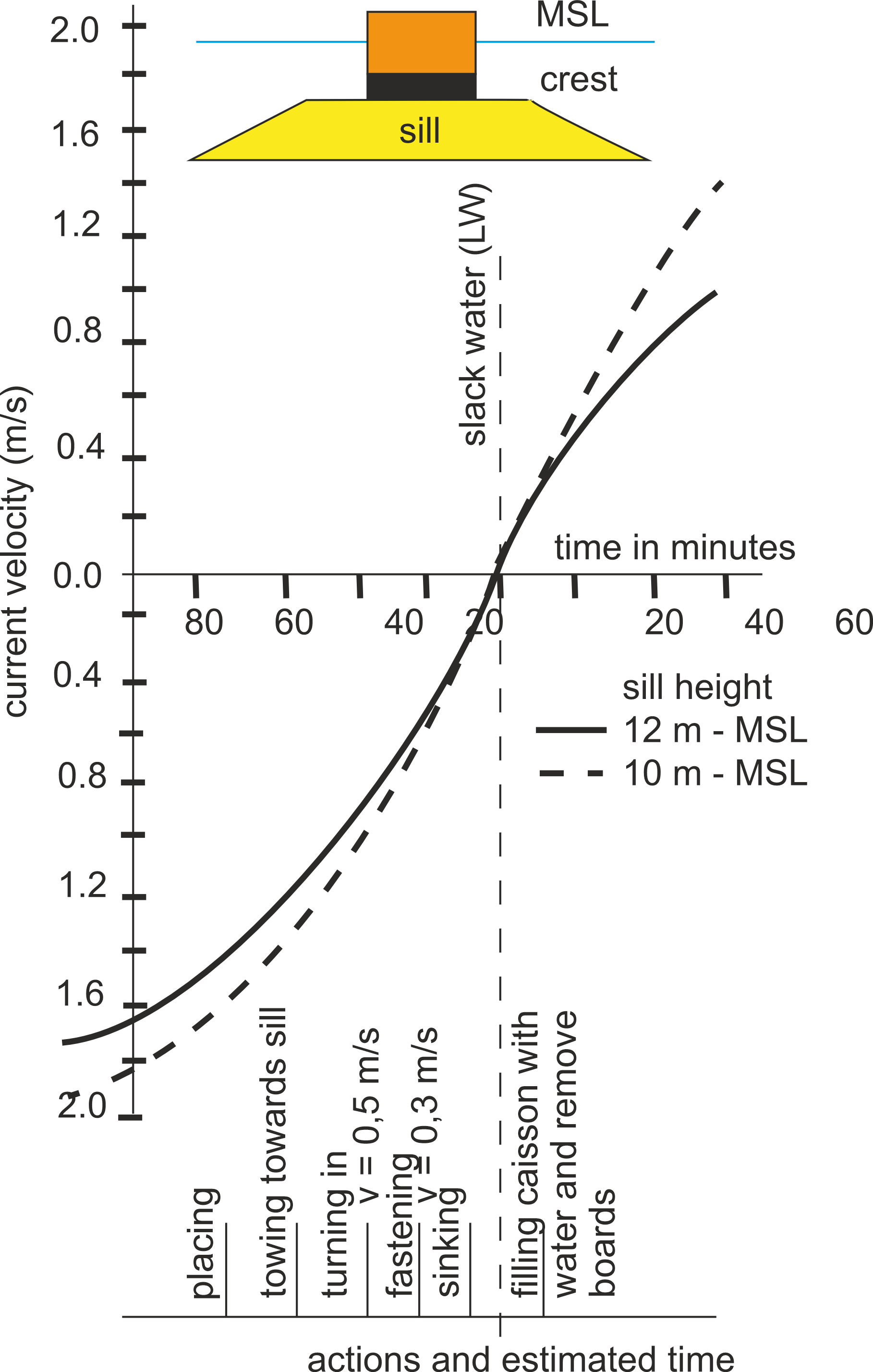
Time needed for sinking

To successfully sink a caisson, it's imperative that the flow velocity within the closing gap is minimized; thus, the operation is conducted during slack water. Given the extremely brief period during which the current is genuinely still, the sinking process must commence while the tidal flow remains at a manageable low speed. Past experiences with caisson closures have demonstrated that this speed should not exceed 0.3 m/s, guiding the timing for various phases of the operation as follows:

Timing Related to Slack Water for Caisson Sinking
Activity	Time Relative to Slack Water	Velocity Above the Sill
Sailing in caisson into gap	-70 min	
Positioning of caisson	-55 min	
Fasting V_{cr} < 0.75 m/s	-30 min	< 0.75 m/s
Sinking V_{cr} < 0.30 m/s	-13 min	< 0.30 m/s
Caisson on sill	-5 min	
Moment of slack water	0 min	
Removal of wooden boards	+10 min	
Placing ballast stone	+60 min	

This schedule dictates that flow speeds must reduce to 0.30 m/s at most 13 minutes before slack water and to 0.75 m/s at most 30 minutes before. Considering the sinusoidal nature of tides in the Netherlands, with a cycle of 12.5 hours, the maximum velocity in the closing gap should not surpass 2.5 m/s. This velocity threshold can be ascertained through a storage/basin analysis. The accompanying diagram illustrates outcomes for sill heights at MSL -10 m and MSL -12 m, indicating that a sill at MSL -12 m is necessary as the sinking time at MSL -10 m is insufficient. Consequently, caisson closures are feasible only at considerable channel depths.

==== Sluice caissons ====
The challenge in sealing larger gaps with caissons lies in the diminishing flow area as more caissons are placed, resulting in significantly increased flow speeds (exceeding the aforementioned 2.5 m/s), complicating the final caisson's proper placement. This issue is addressed through the use of sluice caissons, essentially a box equipped with gates on one side. During installation, these gates are shut to maintain buoyancy, and the opposite side is sealed with wooden boards.

Once each caisson is positioned, the boards are removed, and the gates opened, allowing the tidal current to pass with minimal impedance. This approach ensures that the flow area doesn't drastically reduce, and flow velocities remain manageable, facilitating the placement of subsequent caissons. After all caissons are set, the gates are closed at slack water, completing the closure. Subsequently, sand is sprayed in front of the dam, and the gates along with other movable mechanisms are removed, available for reuse in future closures.

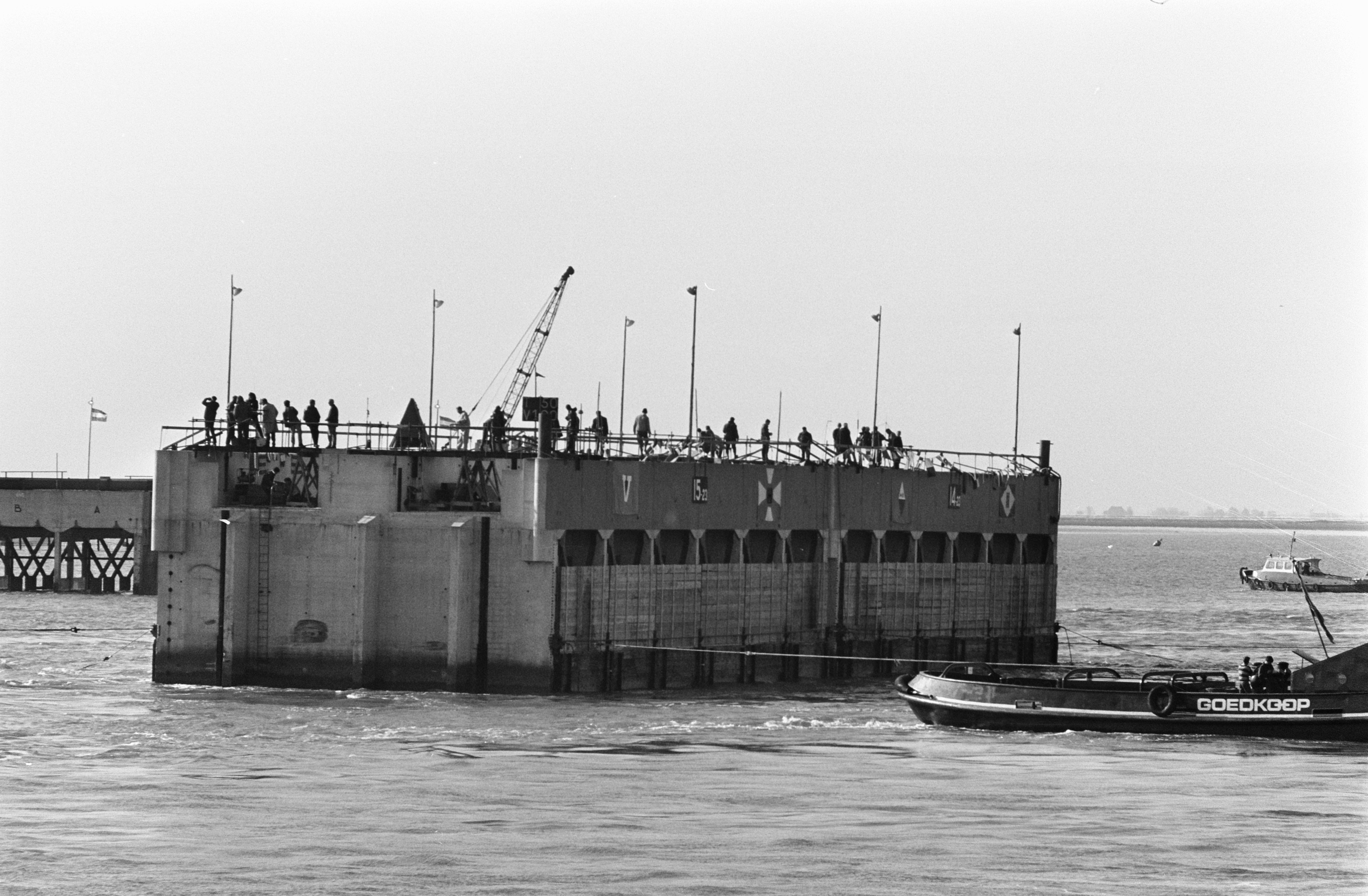
Closing the Lauwerszee with the last caisson

Sluice caissons were first employed in closing the Veerse Gat, and subsequently utilized at the Brouwersdam and the Volkerak. They were also deployed in the closure of the Lauwerszee.

===== Design of Sluice Caissons =====
For caisson closures, it is crucial to maintain the largest effective flow profile possible during installation. Additionally, the discharge coefficient must be as high as possible, indicating the degree to which flow is obstructed by the caisson's shape.

===== Flow Area =====
The flow area of each caisson should be maximised. This can be achieved by:

- Ensuring the greatest possible distance between the caisson walls, with steel diagonals providing sufficient torsional stiffness.
- Designing the bottom of the caissons to be as thin as possible.
- Incorporating ballast spaces within the superstructure of the caisson to add necessary weight, thereby generating sufficient friction between the caisson and the sill.

===== Discharge Coefficient =====
Besides the flow area, the discharge coefficient is of paramount importance. Measures to improve the discharge coefficient include:

- Streamlining the diagonals between the walls.
- Adding extra features to streamline the sill.

The table below provides the discharge coefficients for various sluice caissons designed in the Netherlands.

Characteristics of Sluice Caissons
Project	Sill Depth Below MSL	Discharge Coefficient
Veerse Gat 1961	-5.5 m	0.78
Lauwerszee 1969	-6.5 m	0.65
Volkerak 1969	-7 m	0.75
Brouwersdam 1971	-10 m	0.85
Oosterschelde (Design)	-20 m	1.00

== Special closures ==
=== Closure by sinking ships ===
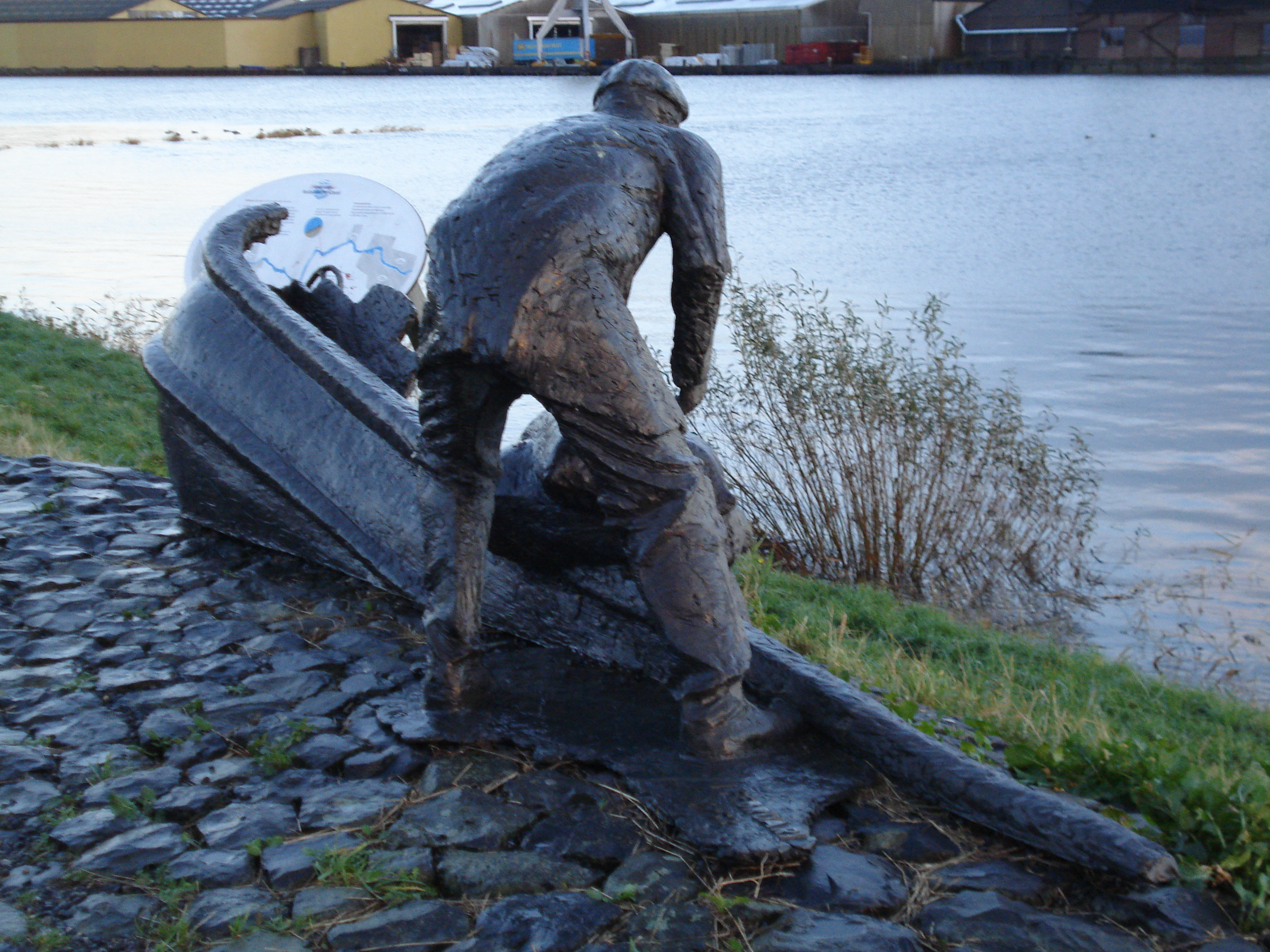
Monument "a dime on its side" near Nieuwerkerk aan den IJssel

In exceptional circumstances, typically during emergencies such as dike breaches, efforts are made to seal the breach by manoeuvring a ship into it. Often, this method fails due to the mismatch between the dimensions of the ship and the breach. Instances have been recorded where the ship, once directed into the breach, was then dislodged by the powerful current. Another frequent issue is the incompatibility of the ship's bottom with the seabed of the breach, leading to undermining. The ensuing strong current further erodes the seabed beneath the ship, rendering the closure attempt unsuccessful. A notable exception occurred in 1953 during a dike breach along the Hollandse IJssel, which was successfully sealed; a monument commemorates this event later.

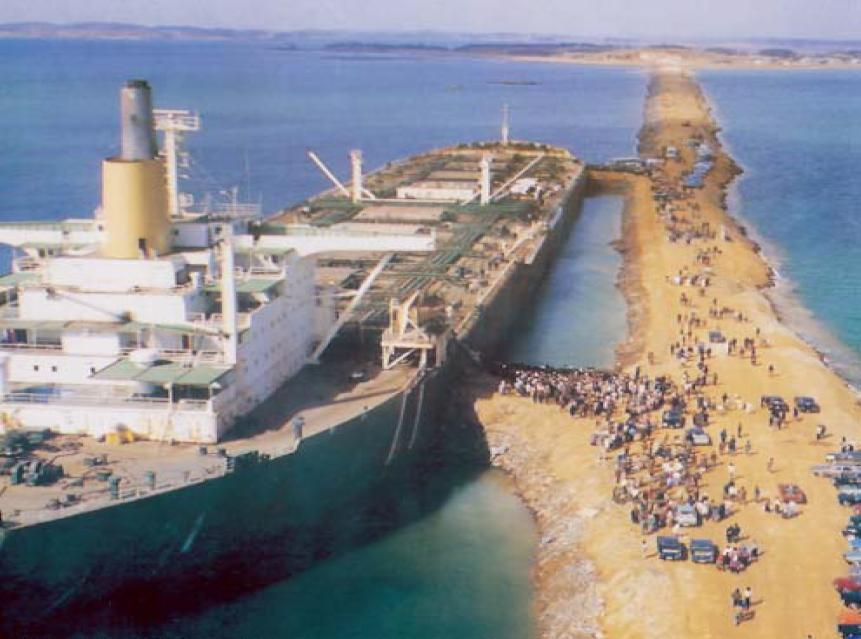
Closing the Seosan estuary in Korea

In Korea, an attempt was made in 1980 to close a tidal inlet using an old oil tanker. Little information is available about the outcome of this attempt, suggesting it may not have been notably successful, especially considering the numerous subsequent closures in Korea that have utilized stone. Later Google Earth imagery indicates that the ship was eventually removed following the dam's closure.

=== Closure with sandbags ===
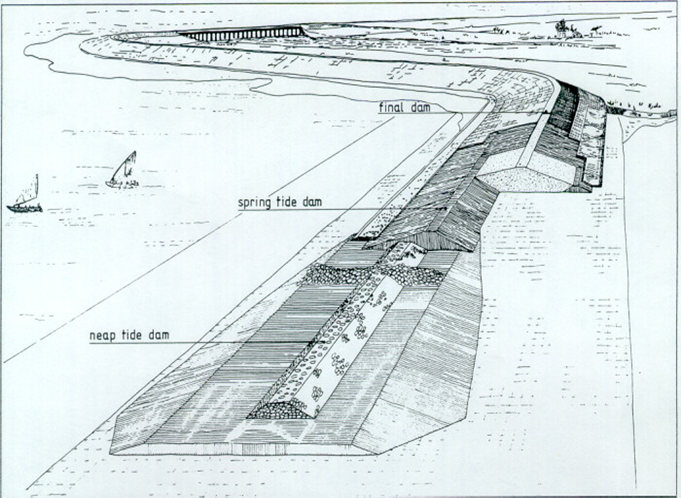
Feni Dam

Utilizing sandbags and a significant workforce represents another unique closure method. This approach was employed during the construction of the dam across the Feni river in Bangladesh. At low tide, the riverbed at the closure site was almost completely exposed.

Twelve depots, each containing 100,000 sandbags, were established along the 1,200 m wide closure gap. On the day of the closure, 12,000 workers deployed these bags into the gap over a span of six hours, outpacing the rising tide. By the day's end, the tidal inlet was sealed, albeit only to the water levels typical of neap tides. In the ensuing days, the dam was further augmented with sand to withstand spring tides and, over the next three months, reinforced to resist storm surges up to 10 metres above the dam's base.

== Storage area approach ==
This so-called "storage-area approach" is standard in closure design literature. It models a short basin by mass balance, neglecting friction and inertia, and yields practical graphs of maximum gap velocity as a function of basin area, gap width, and sill level.

Utilising the tidal prism for velocity calculations in the neck of a tidal inlet

If a tidal basin is relatively short (i.e., its length is minor compared to the tidal wave's length), it's assumed that the basin's water level remains even, merely rising and falling with the tide. Under this assumption, the basin's storage (tidal prism) equals its surface area times the tidal range.

The formula for basin storage then simplifies to:

$P = B \Delta H$, in which:
- $P$ represents the tidal prism (m^{3}),
- $B$ signifies the basin area (m^{2}),
- $\Delta H$ denotes the tidal range at the basin's entrance (m).

This methodology facilitates a reliable estimation of current velocities within the tidal inlet, essential for its eventual closure. Termed the storage area approach, this technique provides a straightforward means to gauge local hydraulic conditions essential for barrier construction.

Within this approach, estuary water movement is modelled without either friction and inertia effects, leading to:

$$Q = B \frac{dh_3}{dt}$$,

in which $Q$ is the flow rate in the inlet, $B$ is the basin storage area, and $\frac{dh_3}{dt}$ is the water level's rate of change.

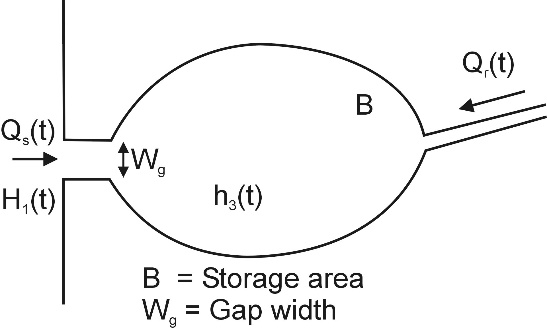
Schematic of the Storage Area Approach

The depicted basin storage system assumes:

- A river discharge $Q_r(t)$, with inflow considered positive,
- A flow through the closure $Q_s(t)$, governed by the energy height difference upstream $H_1(t)$ and water level at the gap $h_2(t)$, along with the gap's drainage characteristics.

For an imperfect weir:

$$Q_s = \mu h_2 W_g \sqrt{2g (H_1 - h_2)} \quad \text{and} \quad h_2 = h_3 \quad \text{for} \quad h_3 > \frac{2}{3} H_1$$

And for a perfect weir:

$$Q_s = m \frac{2}{3} h_2 W_g \sqrt{\frac{2}{3}g H_1} \quad \text{and} \quad h_2 = \frac{2}{3}H_1 \quad \text{for} \quad h_3 < \frac{2}{3} H_1$$

Symbol meanings are as follows:

Symbol	Description
Q_{s}	Flow rate through the closure gap [m^{3}/s]
W_{g}	Flow area at the gap [m^{2}]
g	Acceleration due to gravity [m/s^{2}]
H_{1}	Energy height upstream relative to the sill [m]
h_{2} / h_{3}	Water level at/in the gap relative to the sill [m]
d	Sill height [m]
μ	Discharge coefficient in imperfect weir conditions [-]
m	Discharge coefficient in perfect weir conditions [-]

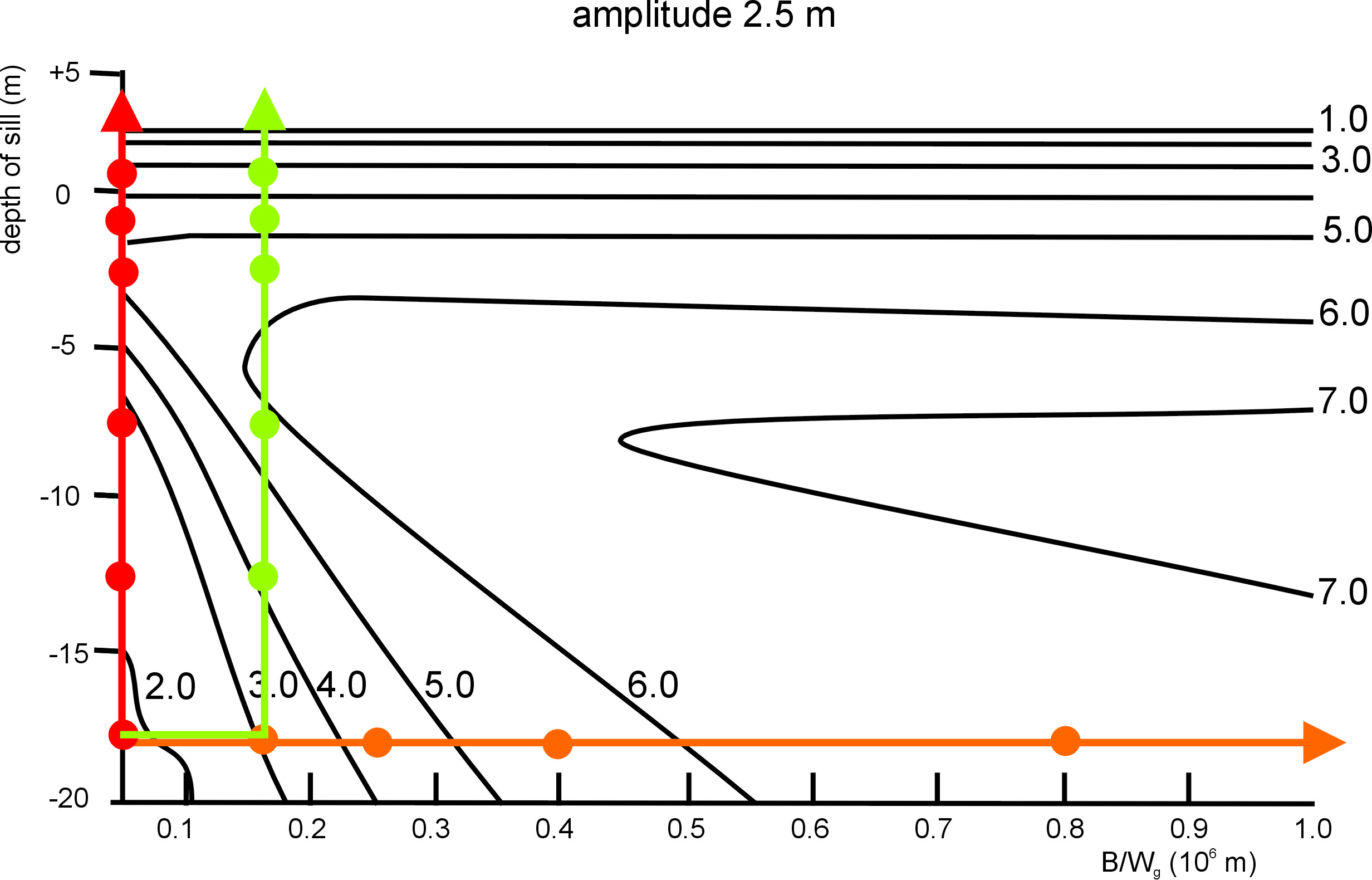
Velocity (m/s) as a function of B/W_{g} and sill height

Combining these yields the basin storage equation, facilitating velocity graphs within the closure gap. An example graph for a tidal amplitude of 2.5 m (therefore a total range of 5 metres) shows velocities as functions of the tidal storage area (B) to closure gap width (W_{g}) ratio and sill depth (d'). Red indicates vertical closures, orange horizontal, and green a combination, highlighting the speed differences between closure types.

== General reference ==
- Verhagen, Henk Jan; van Duivendijk, Hans; Beaufort, Gé (2012). Rock Manual, chapter 7, Design of closure works (PDF) (2nd ed.). CIRIA, CUR & CETMEF. pp. 907–963. ISBN 978-0-86017-683-1.
- Huis in 't Veld, Hans (1987). The closure of tidal basins: Closing of estuaries: tidal inlets and dike breaches. Delft: Delft University press. ISBN 90-6275-287-X.
- Konter, J.L.M.; Klatter, H.E.; Jorissen, R.E. (1992). Afsluitdammen, regels voor het ontwerp [Closure dams, rules for design] (in Dutch). Rijkswaterstaat, Bouwdienst.
- Van Roode, Ferd (1994). Damming of tidal estuaries and lowland rivers. Delft: Delft University of Technology.
- Verhagen, Henk Jan (2017). Closure works. Delft: Delft Academic press. ISBN 978-90-6562-402-4.
