= Tidal prism =

Volume of water in an estuary or inlet between mean high tide and mean low tide

A tidal prism is the volume of water in an estuary or inlet between mean high tide and mean low tide, or the volume of water leaving an estuary at ebb tide.

The inter-tidal prism volume can be expressed by the relationship: P=H A, where H is the average tidal range and A is the average surface area of the basin. It can also be thought of as the volume of the incoming tide plus the river discharge. Simple tidal prism models stated the relationship of river discharge and inflowing ocean water as Prism=Volume of ocean water coming into an estuary on the flood tide + Volume of river discharge mixing with that ocean water; however, there is some controversy as to whether traditional prism models are accurate. The size of an estuary's tidal prism is dependent on the basin of that estuary, the tidal range and other frictional forces.

== Applications of tidal prism ==
Calculations of tidal prism are useful in determining the residence time of water (and pollutants) in an estuary. If it is known how much water is exported compared to how much of the estuarine water remains, it can be determined how long pollutants reside in that estuary. If the tidal prism forms a large proportion of the water in an estuary at high tide, then when the tide ebbs, it will take with it the majority of the water (this occurs in shallow estuaries) and any pollutants or sediments suspended in that water. This means that the estuary has a good flushing time, or that the residence time of water in that estuary is low. On the contrary, in deeper estuaries, the amount of water that is influenced by the tides forms a smaller proportion of the total water. The difference between high tide and low tide is not as great as in shallower estuaries creating a smaller tidal prism and a longer residence time.

The size of an inlet or estuary is determined, according to O’Brien by tidal prism. Tidal prism magnitude can be calculated by multiplying the area of the estuary by the tidal range of that estuary. During spring or fall tides, when sea level is relatively high and floods backbarrier areas that are normally above tidal inundation, the cross sectional area at the entrance of the estuary increases as tidal prism increases. Since tidal prism is largely a function of area of open water and tidal range, it can be changed by alterations of the basin area of estuaries and inlets as in dredging; however, if the estuary or inlet is dredged, or the size changed, the channel will fill in with sediment until it has returned to tidal prism equilibrium.

== Sand transport ==
Additionally, there are correlations between tidal prism and amount of sediment deposited and exported in an estuary or inlet. The Walton and Adams relationship shows a strong relationship between the magnitude of the tidal prism and the volume of sand in ebb dominated deltas. The larger the tidal prism, the larger the amount of sand that is deposited in deltas in ebb-dominated estuaries. Inlets with small tidal prisms have too little power to remove sand deposited from adjacent shores. Inlets with large tidal prisms can erode sand and deposit it in ebb-tidal deltas in deeper waters (National Research Council). The size of ebb tidal deltas is proportional to tidal prism. If tidal prism increases, there is an increase in deltas and shoals formed by sand transport during ebb tide.

== Tidal prism models and assumptions ==
There are assumptions that go along with tidal prism models. The first is that they are applied to smaller estuaries (less than a few kilometers wide) and secondly, that the estuaries are internally well mixed. Additionally, it is assumed that the water entering the estuary is of oceanic salinity mixing with the fresh river discharge, and that the mixed water will be exported on the ebb tide. Officer provides a model for simple tidal prism theory where the estuary is represented by a box with the inflow as the volume of river discharge at a salinity of 0, within the estuary, the river discharge mixes with the volume of the tide flooding in (Vp) from the ocean at oceanic salinity (So) and the mixed VR + VP) water flows out at ebb tide.
