= Brouwersdam =

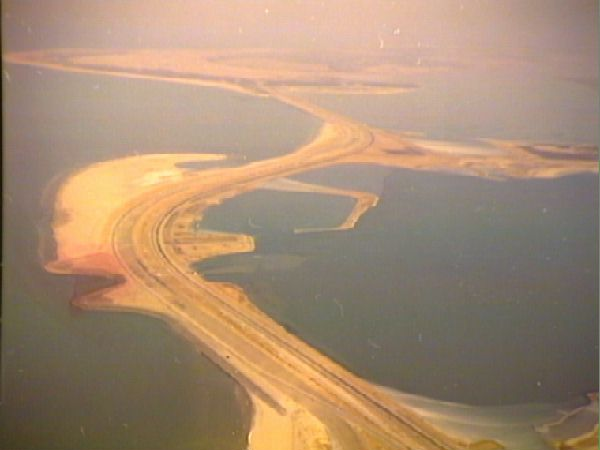
- Brouwersdam
- Coordinates: 51°46′0″N 3°52′0″E
- Carries: N57
- Owner: Rijkswaterstaat

Characteristics
- Total length: 6.5 kilometres (4.0 mi)

History
- Construction start: 1962
- Construction end: 1971

Location
- Interactive map of Brouwersdam

The Brouwersdam is the seventh structure of the Delta Works in the Netherlands, forming a barrier across the former estuary known as the Brouwershavense Gat. As a result, the area of water became known as the Grevelingenmeer.

== Construction ==
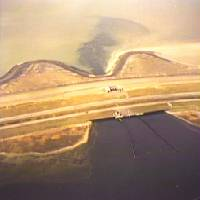
Spuisluis in the Brouwersdam

The Grevelingendam between Goeree-Overflakkee and Schouwen-Duiveland was completed in 1965. The Grevelingen south of Goeree-Overflakkee were still connected to the North Sea. The storm surge could therefore be higher here, so dykes were raised on the south side of the island in 1965. Construction of the Brouwersdam was begun immediately after the Grevelingendam was completed in order to shorten the period of higher flood. After more than six years, in the spring of 1971, the dam was finished. Between 1964 and 1971 there had been some very high water levels. In November 1966 the water was just a few centimeters below the level of the infamous floods of February 1, 1953.

Construction of the six-kilometer long dam was begun in 1962. The inlet between Goeree-Overfkakke and Schouwen-Duiveland was 30 meters deep. As with other dams, caissons with holes were lowered, allowing the tides to go through during the construction of the dam. This avoided creating too strong a current in the narrowing gap. This method was used for the northern gap at De Kous.

Besides the caissons for the Southern gap, the Brouwershavense Gat, a cableway was used. From the cableway, large blocks of concrete were dropped in the trench, on top of which sand was sprayed. This constructed two large sandbars. The local channel was too deep and the water flowed too fast for the caissons method. After all the caissons were lowered, all the gaps were plugged.

The Brouwersdam was finished in 1971. Following the completion of the Gravelingen the fall in water level exposed about 3,000 hectares of dry land. The road to the dam (National Highway 57) was commissioned on March 30, 1973. After completion, the native flora and fauna quickly began to die off as rainwater and water flowing in from the surrounding polders began to transform the lake into a brackish body of water. A decision was made to return the salinity to its original state. On June 1, 1978, the Brouwerssluis, an inlet sluice, was installed in the dam, allowing water in from the sea.

== Activities ==
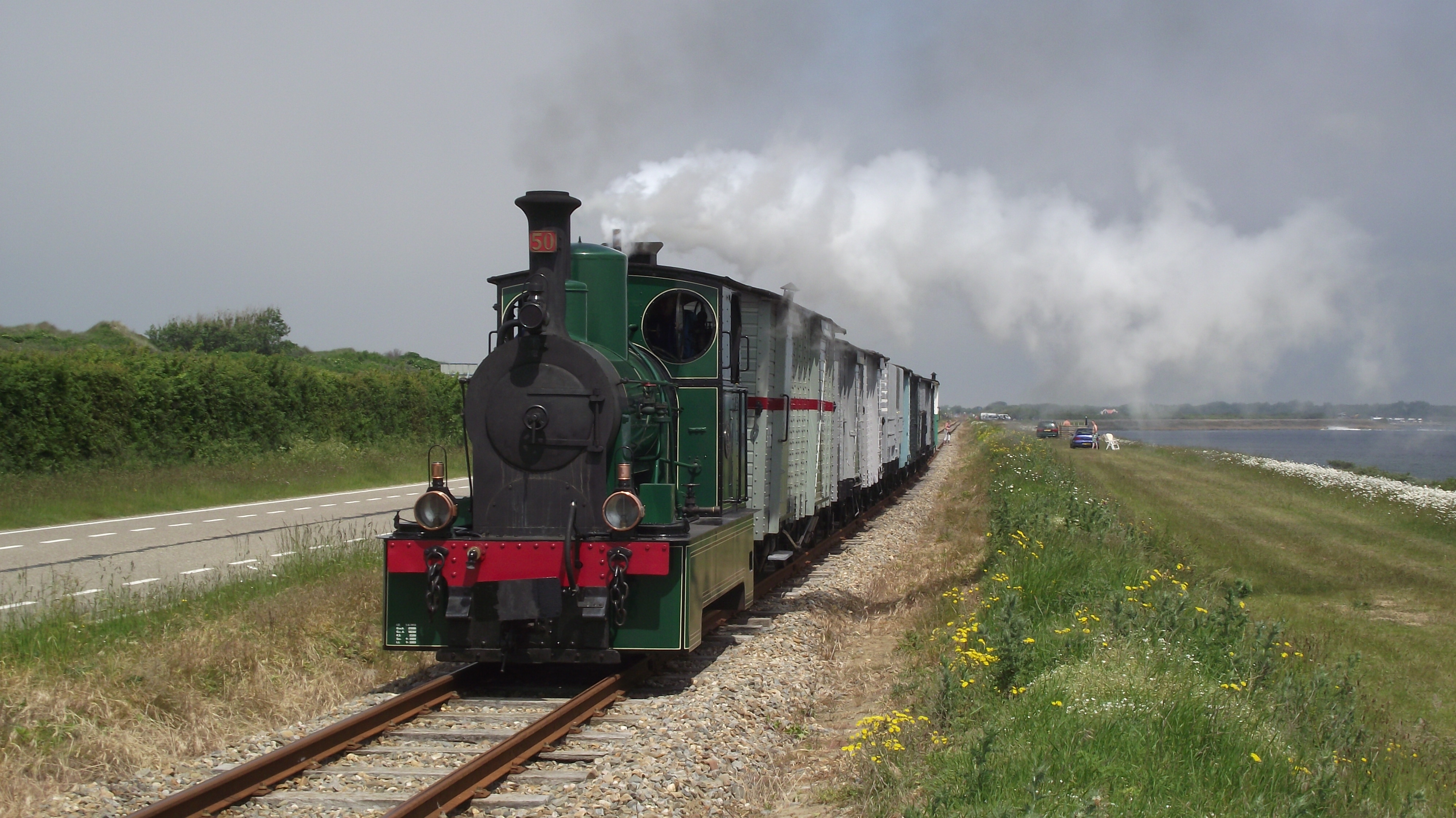
RTM Stoomgoederentram on the Brouwersdam

Kitesurfing at Brouwersdam

Halfway through the dam is a marina and the holiday park, Port Zélande. In the area water sports such as kitesurfing and windsurfing are popular.

The Rijdend Tram Museum Foundation operates a route from Ouddorp (Punt de Goeree), via Port Zélande, to Scharendijke using historic stock from the Rotterdamse Tramweg Maatschappijt.

The three-day "Concert at Sea" music festival has been held annually since 2006 at the Brouwersdam.
