= Aeroflot-Cargo =

Russian cargo airline

Aeroflot-Cargo Division Аэрофлот-Карго
IATA	ICAO	Call sign
SU	RCF	AEROFLOT CARGO
- Founded: 1995; 31 years ago
- Ceased operations: April 5, 2010 (Merged with Aeroflot)
- Hubs: Sheremetyevo International Airport
- Alliance: SkyTeam Cargo
- Fleet size: 3
- Destinations: 11
- Parent company: Aeroflot
- Headquarters: Moscow, Russia
- Key people: Oleg Konstantinovich Korolev (General Director)
- Website: www.aeroflot.ru

CJSC "Aeroflot-Cargo" (Russian: Аэрофлот-Карго) was a fully owned subsidiary of Aeroflot, founded in 1995. It was the second largest cargo airline in Russia, behind Volga-Dnepr subsidiary AirBridge Cargo. In June 2009, the shareholders of Russia's flagship air carrier, Aeroflot, decided to declare the company's cargo subsidiary, Aeroflot Cargo, bankrupt.

The cargo division of Aeroflot now operates as part of the airline's regular fleet instead of a subsidiary. On 11 May 2011, Aeroflot Russian Airlines completed preparations for joining the global airline alliance SkyTeam Cargo. They will be the 9th member of the alliance.

== Operations ==
Until December 2009, Aeroflot-Cargo operated regular cargo-carrying flights from Europe to Asia and back via Russia.

On 5 April 2010, the company was declared bankrupt and bankruptcy proceedings were introduced, aircraft were returned to lessors and a general wind-down of operations.

== Destinations ==
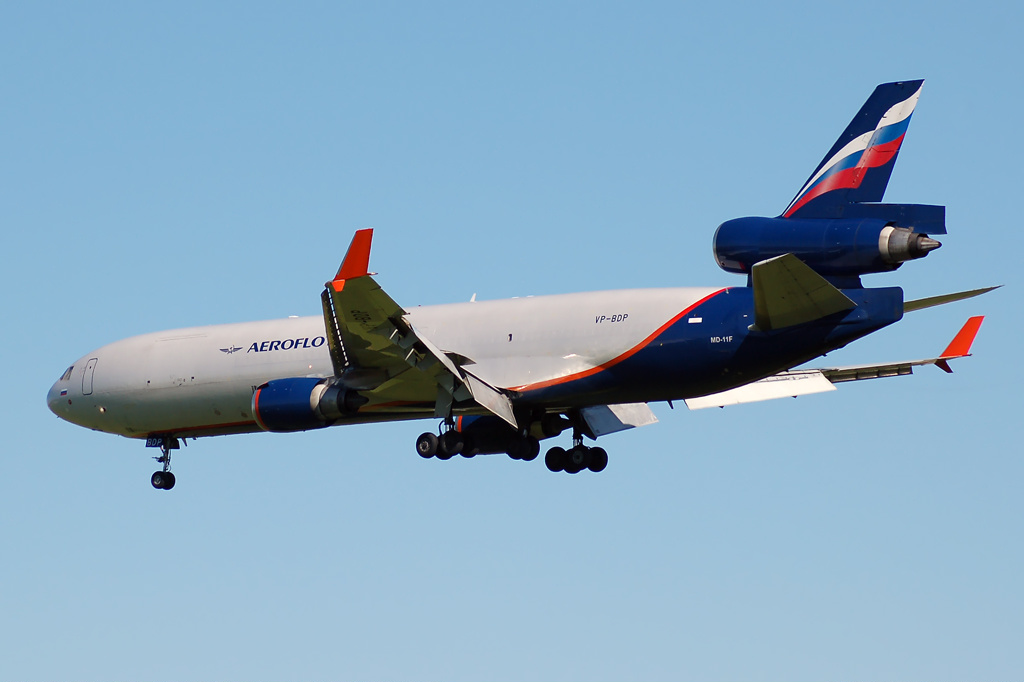
An Aeroflot-Cargo McDonnell Douglas MD-11F at Sheremetyevo International Airport (2010)

Aeroflot-Cargo served the following destinations (as of June 2009):

=== Asia ===
- China
  - Beijing - Beijing Capital International Airport
  - Shanghai - Shanghai Pudong International Airport
- Hong Kong
  - Hong Kong - Hong Kong International Airport
- Japan
  - Tokyo - Narita International Airport
- South Korea
  - Seoul - Incheon International Airport
- United Arab Emirates
  - Dubai - Dubai International Airport

=== Europe ===
- Finland
  - Helsinki - Helsinki Airport
- Germany
  - Hahn - Frankfurt–Hahn Airport
- Russia
  - Moscow - Sheremetyevo International Airport Hub
  - Novosibirsk - Tolmachevo Airport
  - Saint Petersburg - Pulkovo Airport
- Turkey
  - Istanbul - Atatürk Airport

== Fleet ==
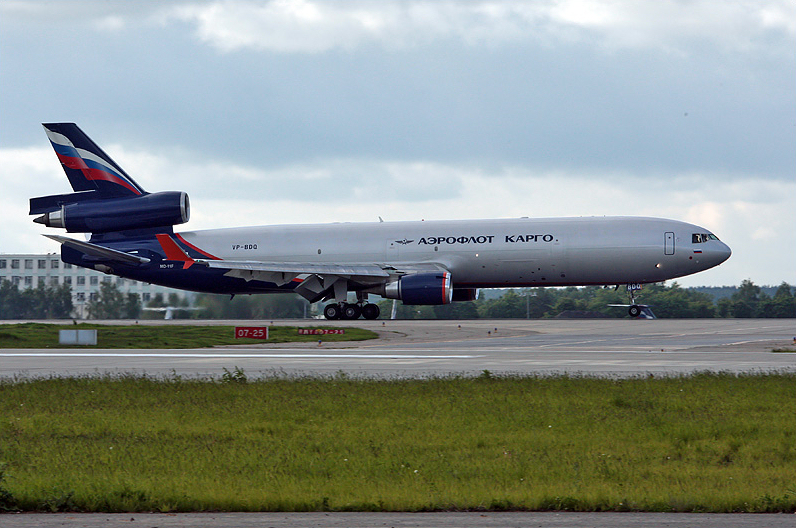
A former Aeroflot-Cargo MD-11 in 2006-2009 livery

The Aeroflot-Cargo Division fleet consists of the following (at 24 May 2011):

Aeroflot-Cargo Fleet
Aircraft	In service	Orders	Notes
McDonnell Douglas MD-11F	3	0	Were part of former Aeroflot Cargo fleet.
