= Korean Air =

National airline of South Korea

Korean Air Lines Co., Ltd.

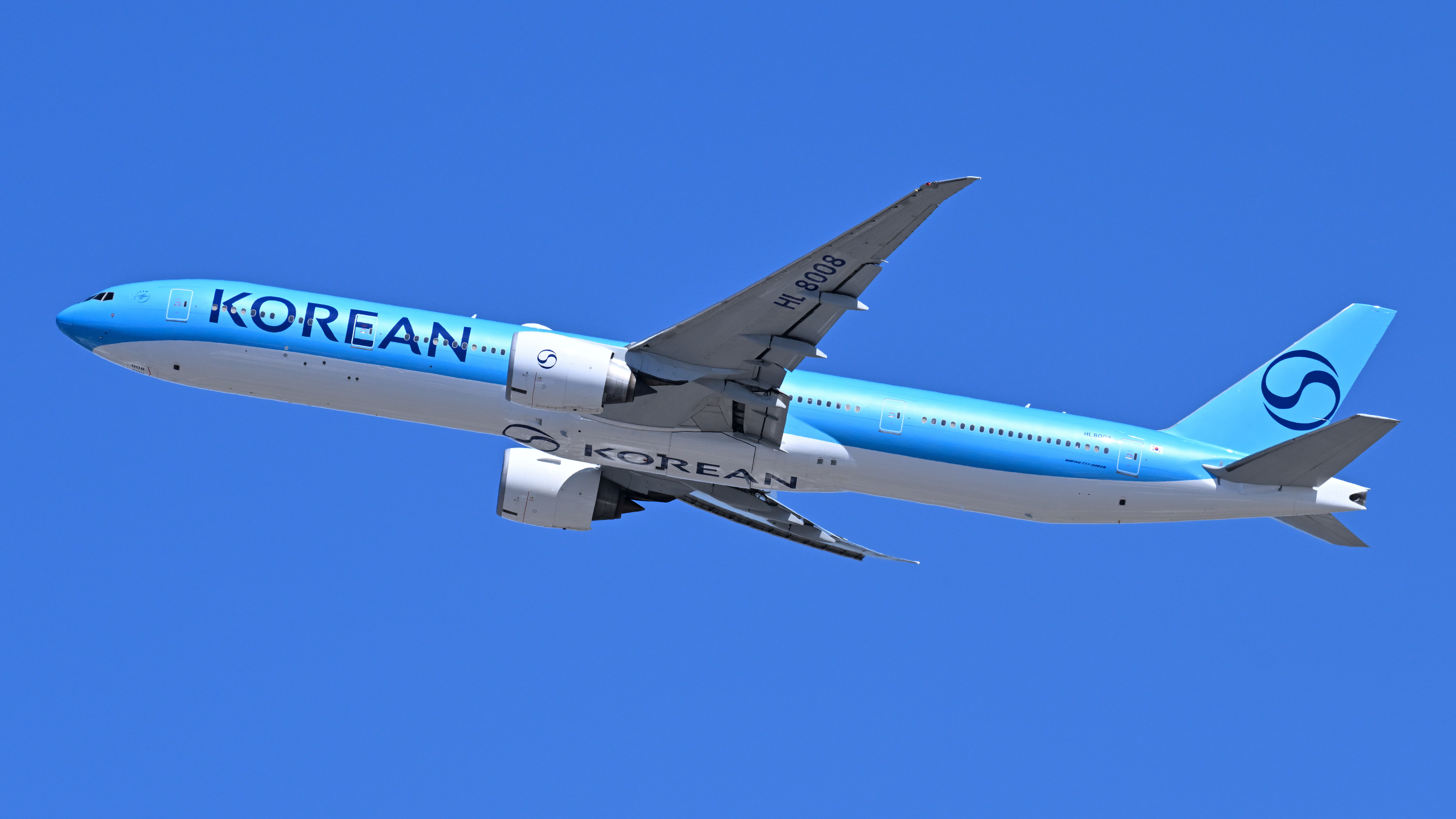
- Korean Air Boeing 777-300ER
IATA	ICAO	Call sign
KE	KAL	KOREAN AIR
- Founded: June 1962; 64 years ago (as Korean Air Lines)
- Commenced operations: 1 March 1984; 42 years ago (as Korean Air)
- Hubs: Seoul–Gimpo; Seoul–Incheon
- Focus cities: Busan; Jeju
- Frequent-flyer program: SKYPASS
- Alliance: SkyTeam; SkyTeam Cargo
- Subsidiaries: Airlines: Asiana Airlines (63.9%); Jin Air; Non-airlines: Air Total Service; CyberSky; Global Logistics System Korea; HIST; Korea Airport Service; Korean Air C&D Service
- Fleet size: 169
- Destinations: 108
- Parent company: Hanjin Group
- Traded as: KRX: 003490
- Headquarters: 260 Haneul-gil, Gangseo District, Seoul, South Korea
- Key people: Walter Cho (Chairman & CEO); Woo Kee-Hong (Vice Chairman); Jason Yoo (COO & Chief Safety Officer)
- Revenue: ▲US$11.5 billion (2025)
- Operating income: ▼US$1,072.8 million (2025)
- Net income: ▼US$672.5 million (2025)
- Total assets: ▲US$25.95 billion (2025)
- Employees: 20,000
- Website: www.koreanair.com

Korean name
- Hangul: 대한항공
- Hanja: 大韓航空
- RR: Daehan hanggong
- MR: Taehan hanggong

Notes
- Financials as of 23 April 2026. References

Korean Air Lines Co., Ltd. (KAL; Korean: 대한항공) is the flag carrier of South Korea and its largest airline based on fleet size, international destinations, and international flights. It is owned by the Hanjin Group. Korean Air is a founding member of SkyTeam alliance and SkyTeam Cargo. As of 2024, it is one of the 11 airlines ranked 5-star airline by Skytrax, and the top 20 airlines in the world in terms of passengers carried and is also one of the top-ranked international cargo airlines.

The present-day Korean Air traces its history to March 1, 1969, when the Hanjin group acquired government-owned Korean Air Lines, which had operated since June 1962. Korean Air's international passenger division and related subsidiary Korean Air Cargo division together serve 126 cities in 44 countries. Its domestic division serves 13 destinations. The airline's global headquarters is located in Seoul, South Korea. The airline had approximately 20,540 employees as of December 2014.

The airline was, around 1999, known as "an industry pariah, notorious for fatal crashes" due to its poor safety record and a large number of incidents and accidents. The airline's reputation has significantly improved by 2009 as it has focused investment on improving its safety record including by hiring consultants from Boeing and Delta Air Lines. In November 2020, it was announced that Korean Air would merge with competitor Asiana Airlines, but was switched to only acquire a major stake after the original merger plan was blocked by the United States Department of Justice for monopoly concerns. The acquisition was completed on December 12, 2024.

== History ==
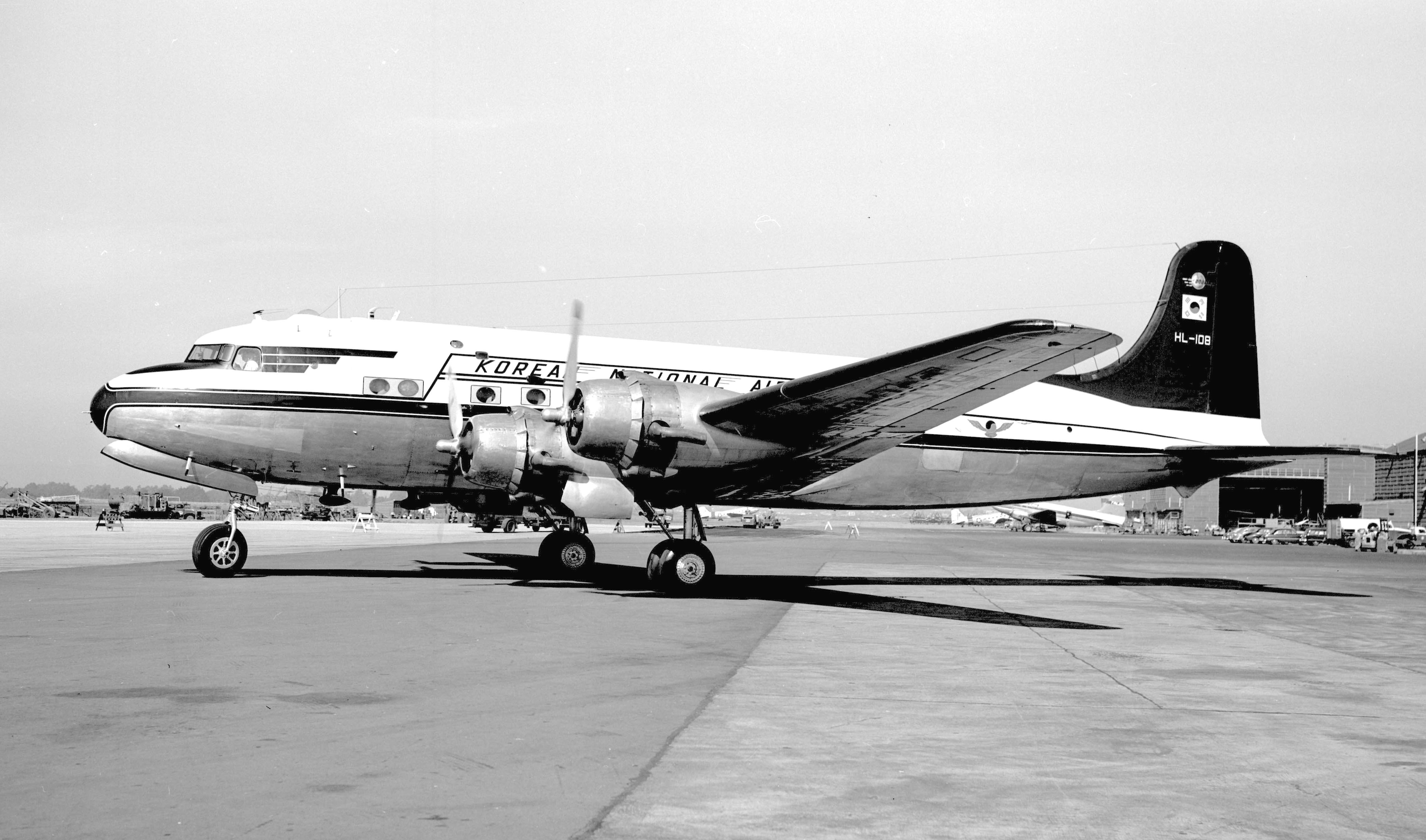
A Korean National Airlines Douglas DC-4 at Oakland in 1953

=== Founding ===
In 1962, government of the Republic of Korea acquired Korean National Airlines, which was founded in 1946, and changed its name to Korean Air Lines to become a state-owned airline. On 1 March 1969, the Hanjin Group acquired the state-owned airline and it is the beginning of Korean Air. Long-haul trans-pacific freight operations were introduced on April 26, 1971, followed by passenger services to Los Angeles International Airport on April 19, 1972.

=== Expansion ===
Korean Air Lines logo from 1969 to 1984.

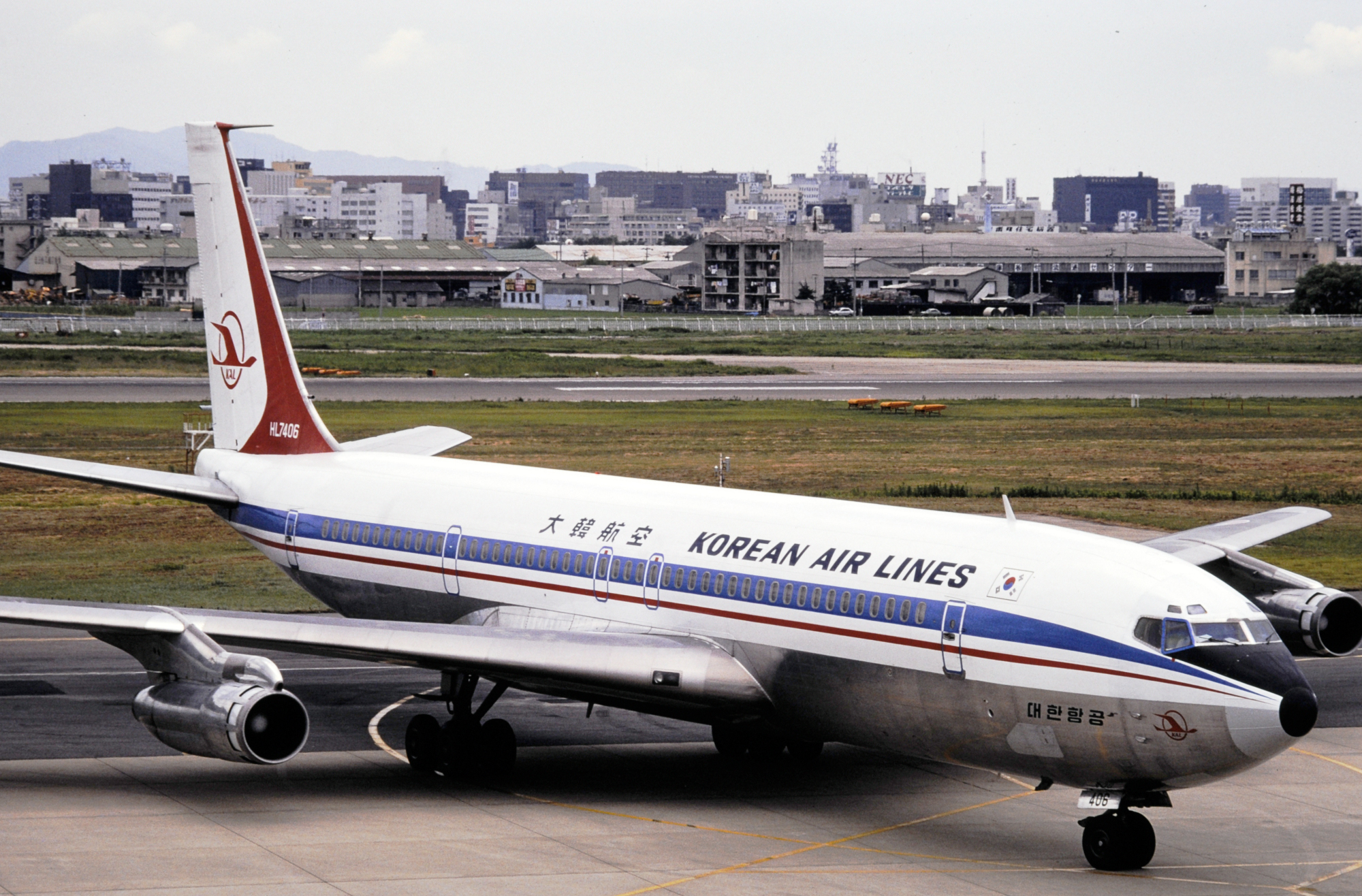
A Korean Air Boeing 707 at Fukuoka Airport in August 1987 with a previous livery. This aircraft is the only Boeing 707 ordered by Korean Air from Boeing, and was destroyed in 1987 as Korean Air Flight 858.

Korean Air operated international flights to destinations such as Hong Kong, Japan, Taiwan, and Los Angeles with Boeing 707s until the introduction of the Boeing 747 in 1973. That year, the airline introduced Boeing 747s on its trans-Pacific routes and started a European service to Paris, France, using the 707 and then McDonnell Douglas DC-10. In 1975, the airline became one of the earliest Asian airlines to operate Airbus aircraft with the purchase of three Airbus A300s, which were put into immediate service on Asian routes. In 1981, Korean Air opened its cargo terminal at Los Angeles International Airport. Since South Korean aircraft were prohibited from flying in the airspace of North Korea and the Soviet Union at the time, the European routes had to be designed eastbound from South Korea, such as Seoul ~ Anchorage ~ Paris.

=== Change to 'Korean Air' ===
Korean Air's logo from March 1, 1984 to March 10, 2025, still used on some aircraft.

A blue-top, silver and redesigned livery with a new corporate "Korean Air" logo featuring a stylized Taegeuk design was introduced on March 1, 1984, and the airline's name changed to Korean Air from Korean Air Lines. This livery was introduced on its MD-80s and Boeing 747-300s. It was designed in cooperation between Korean Air and Boeing. In the 1990s, Korean Air became the first airline to use the new McDonnell Douglas MD-11 to supplement its new fleet of Boeing 747-400 aircraft; however, the MD-11 did not meet the airline's performance requirements, and they were eventually converted to freighters. Some older 747 aircraft were also converted for freight service. In 1984, Korean Air's head office was in the KAL Building on Namdaemunno, Jung District, Seoul.

=== Checkered safety culture and record ===
Korean Air was once notorious for its abysmal safety record and high rate of fatal crashes. In 1999, Korea's President Kim Dae-jung described the airline's safety record as "an embarrassment to the nation" and chose Korean Air's smaller rival, Asiana, for a flight to the United States.

Between 1970 and 1999, Korean Air wrote off 16 aircraft due to serious incidents and accidents, with the loss of over 700 lives. In the case of Korean Air Flight 801, the National Transportation Safety Board unanimously concluded that the airline's inadequate pilot training contributed to the pilot error that caused the fatal crash.

In 1999, Delta Air Lines suspended its code-sharing relationship with Korean Air, explicitly citing its poor safety record following the fatal crash of Korean Air Cargo Flight 6316. It marked the first time safety was explicitly cited as the reason for stopping a major code-sharing alliance by an airline. Other partners including Air Canada and Air France followed suit.

In 2001, the Federal Aviation Administration downgraded South Korea's aviation safety rating and blocked South Korean carriers from expanding into the United States after the country and its carriers failed to improve sufficiently following a warning the previous year. The move was driven by the country's lax oversight of its carriers including Korean Air.

The rating has since been restored as the airline invested billions of dollars to improve safety, upgrade its fleet, install new technology, and overhaul its corporate culture including hiring consultants from Boeing and Delta Air Lines. In 2002, the New York Times noted that Korean Air had been removed from many "shun lists".

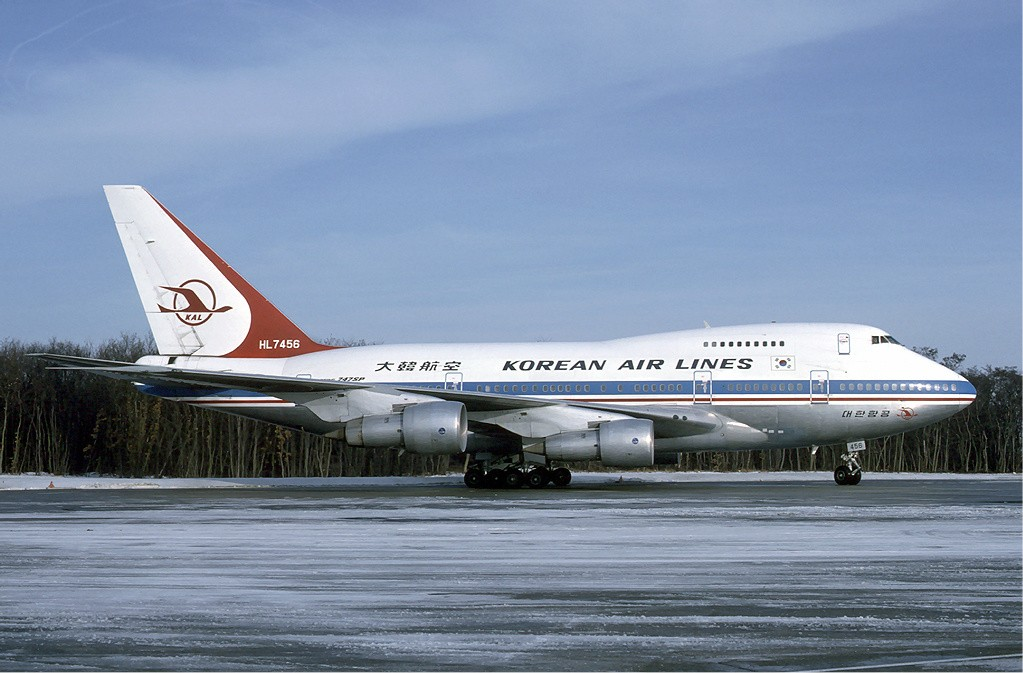
Korean Air Lines Boeing 747SP at EuroAirport Basel Mulhouse Freiburg in 1985

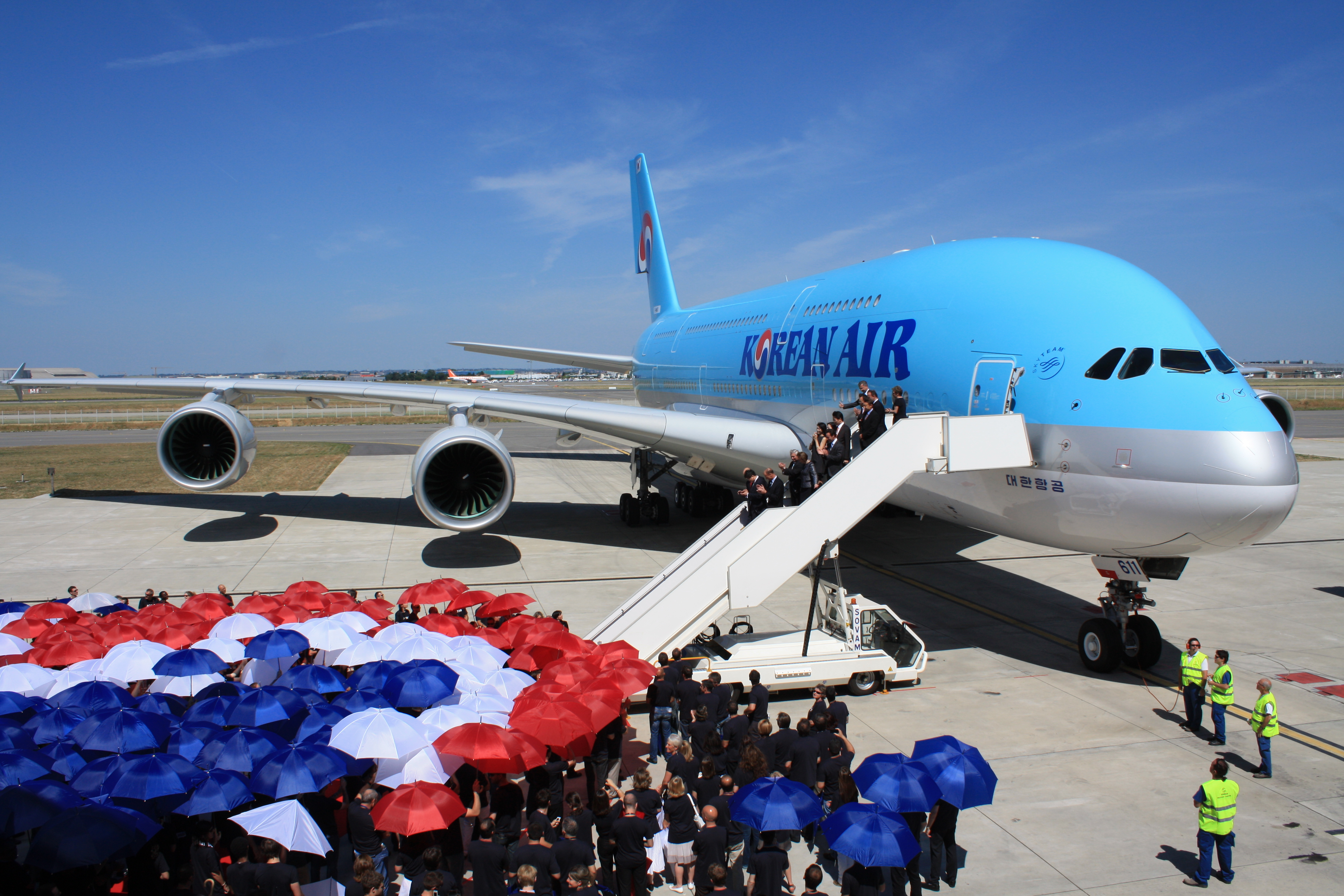
Korean Air takes delivery of its first Airbus A380 at Toulouse–Blagnac Airport, France on May 25, 2011.

=== Early 21st century ===
On 23 June 2000, along with Aeroméxico, Air France, and Delta Air Lines, Korean Air founded major airline alliance, SkyTeam and SkyTeam Cargo, founded on 28 September 2000.

On 5 June 2007, Korean Air said that it would create a new low-cost carrier called Jin Air in Korea to compete with Korea's KTX high-speed railway network system, which offered cheaper fares and less stringent security procedures compared to air travel. Jin Air started scheduled passenger service on July 17, 2008. Korean Air announced that some of its 737s and A300s would be given to Jin Air.

In mid-2010, a co-marketing deal with games company Blizzard Entertainment sent a 747-400 and a 737-900 taking to the skies wrapped in StarCraft II branding. In August 2010, Korean Air announced heavy second-quarter losses despite record-high revenue. In August 2010, Hanjin Group, the parent of KAL, opened a new cargo terminal at Navoiy International Airport in Uzbekistan, which will become a cargo hub with regular Seoul-Navoi-Milan flights.

In 2013, Korean Air acquired a 44% stake in Czech Airlines. It sold the stake in October 2017. On 1 May 2018, the airline launched a joint venture partnership with Delta Air Lines.

In 2019, Korean Air began playing a safety video with the K-pop group SuperM. It featured the song "Let's go everywhere", which was to be released as a single. The airline also featured the group on a livery sported by a Boeing 777-300ER, with registration HL8010.

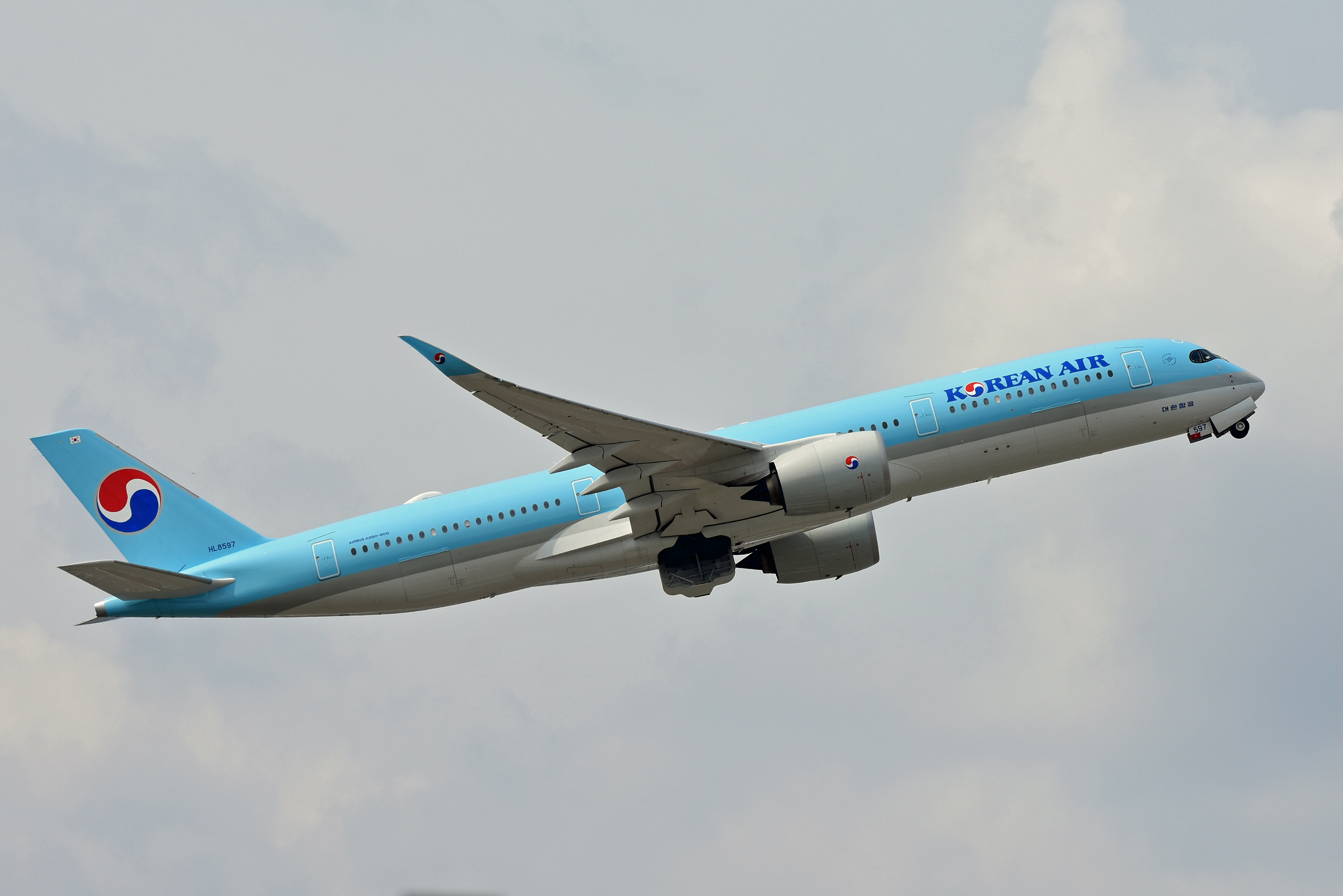
A Korean Air Airbus A350-900

In 2023, Korean Air was certified a 5-star Airline by Skytrax, an air transport rating organization.

In 2025, a 10% shareholding was acquired in Canadian airline WestJet.

=== Nut rage incident ===
Cho Hyun-Ah, also known as "Heather Cho", is the daughter of then-chairman Cho Yang-ho. She resigned from some of her duties in late 2014 after she ordered a Korean Air jet to return to the gate to allow a flight attendant to be removed from the aircraft. The attendant had served Cho nuts in a bag instead of on a plate. As a result of further fallout, Cho Hyun-Ah was later arrested by Korean authorities for violating South Korea's aviation safety laws.

=== Merger with Asiana Airlines ===
In November 2020, during the COVID-19 pandemic, the South Korean Government officially announced that Korean Air will acquire Asiana Airlines. The Ministry of Land, Infrastructure and Transport of the Republic of Korea will integrate subsidiaries Air Busan, Air Seoul, and Jin Air to form a combined low-cost carrier which will focus on regional airports in Korea.

In March 2021, KAL announced that the merger with Asiana Airlines would be delayed as foreign authorities had not approved the deal. As of 2023, the deal has not been completed as essential countries have approached the deal with skepticism.

On 12 December 2024, Reuters reported that Korean Air had completed the purchase of debt-laden Asiana Airlines in a deal worth 1.5 trillion won (USD 1.6 billion). The deal enables Korean Air to acquire 63.88% of the second-largest airline in the country, becoming the 12th largest airline in the world by international capacity.

Korean Air Taegeuk symbol since 11 March 2025

=== Rebranding ===
On 11 March 2025, as part of its merger with Asiana Airlines, in which the latter brand will be fully absorbed in 2027, Korean Air unveiled its first major corporate rebrand since 1984. The rebranding was done in partnership with design agency Lippincott and saw the existing "Taegeuk" symbol lose its blue and red color palette in favor of outlined monochromatic dark blue color of the same symbol. It also replaced the wordmark "KOREAN AIR" written in a modified Cooper Black typeface with a sans-serif version named "Korean Air Sans" designed by Dalton Maag for the same wordmark (in the case of aircraft liveries, the wordmark is just "KOREAN"). Lippincott notes that reinterpreting the Taegeuk symbol and removing it from the logotype enhances its visibility, and its calligraphic brush-strokes style adds elegance to the new identity. Meanwhile, the new uniforms for Korean and Asiana employees signifying the unified "Korean Air" brand will be introduced in 2027.

== Corporate affairs and identity ==
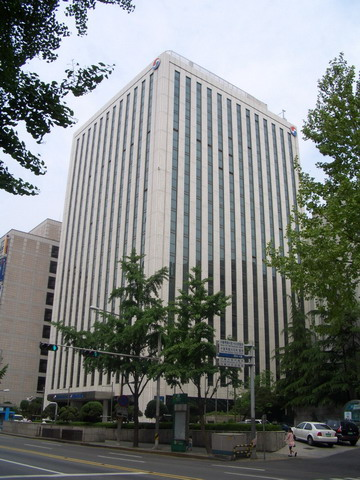
One of the airline's offices, the KAL building in Seoul

=== Ownership ===
Korean Air is owned by Hanjin Group, and it is majority controlled by Hanjin KAL Corporation. Walter Cho, its current chairman and CEO, is the third generation of the family who controls Hanjin KAL to lead the airline. (Hanjin KAL's largest shareholder is Delta Air Lines, at 14.90% ownership.) As of 5 June 2020, Hanjin KAL holds 29.27% of Korean Air shares.

=== Hubs and headquarters ===
Incheon International Airport Terminal 2 is Korean Air's international hub.

Korean Air's headquarters (대한항공 빌딩/大韓航空 빌딩) is located on the grounds of Gimpo International Airport in Gonghang-dong, Gangseo District, Seoul. The company also maintains a satellite headquarters campus at Incheon.

Korean Air's other hubs are at Jeju International Airport, Jeju and Gimhae International Airport, Busan. The maintenance facilities are located in Gimhae International Airport. The majority of Korean Air's pilots, ground staff, and flight attendants are based in Seoul and Busan.

=== Chaebol and nepotism ===
Korean Air has been cited as one of the examples of the South Korean "chaebol" system, wherein corporate conglomerates, established with government support, overreach diverse branches of industry. For much of the time between the foundation of Korean Air as Korean National Airlines in 1946 and the foundation of Asiana Airlines in 1988, Korean Air was the only airline operating in South Korea.

The process of the sale of Korean National Airlines to Hanjin in 1969 was supported by Park Chung Hee, the South Korean military general-turned president who seized power of the country through a military coup d'état; and the monopoly of the airline was secured for two decades until his assassination in 1979.

After widening the chaebol branches, the subsidiary corporations of Korean Air include marine and overland transportation businesses, hotels, and real estate among others; and the previous branches included heavy industry, passenger transportation, construction, and a stockbroking business. The nature of the South Korean chaebol system involves nepotism. A series of incidents involving Korean Air in the 2000s have "revealed an ugly side of the culture within chaebols, South Korea's giant family-run conglomerates".

=== Hotel ownership ===
Korean Air owns three hotels: a KAL hotel in Seogwipo, Jeju, the Hyatt in Incheon, and a hotel/office building called the Wilshire Grand Tower in Los Angeles. This building in downtown Los Angeles houses the largest InterContinental Hotel in the Americas in what is the tallest building in Los Angeles.

=== Korean Air Aerospace Division ===
Korean Air Aerospace logo

Korean Air is also involved in aerospace research and manufacturing. The division, known as the Korean Air Aerospace Division (KAL-ASD), has manufactured licensed versions of the MD Helicopters MD 500 and Sikorsky UH-60 Black Hawk helicopters, as well as the Northrop F-5E/F Tiger II fighter aircraft, the aft fuselage and wings for the KF-16 fighter aircraft manufactured by Korean Aerospace Industries and parts for various commercial aircraft including the Boeing 737, Boeing 747, Boeing 777, and Boeing 787 Dreamliner; and the Airbus A330 and Airbus A380. In 1991, the division designed and flew the Korean Air Chang-Gong 91 light aircraft. KAA also provides aircraft maintenance support for the United States Department of Defense in Asia and maintains a research division with focuses on launch vehicles, satellites, commercial aircraft, military aircraft, helicopters, and simulation systems.

In October 2012, a development deal between Bombardier Aerospace and a government-led South Korean consortium was announced, aiming to develop a 90-seat turboprop regional airliner, targeting a 2019 launch date. The consortium would have included Korea Aerospace Industries and Korean Air. While this plan did not come to fruition, in 2019, Korean Aerospace Industries nevertheless decided to conduct a two-year study to assess the feasibility of taking the lead on building a turboprop airliner.

== Destinations ==
=== Codeshare agreements ===
Korean Air has codeshare agreements with the following airlines:

- Aerolíneas Argentinas
- Aeroméxico
- Air Europa
- Air France
- Air Tahiti Nui
- Air New Zealand
- Alaska Airlines
- Aurora
- China Airlines
- China Eastern Airlines
- China Southern Airlines
- Delta Air Lines (Joint Venture Partner)
- Emirates
- Etihad Airways
- Garuda Indonesia
- Gol Linhas Aéreas Inteligentes
- Hainan Airlines
- Hawaiian Airlines
- Japan Airlines
- Jin Air (Subsidiary)
- Kenya Airways
- KLM
- LATAM Brasil
- LATAM Chile
- LATAM Perú
- Malaysia Airlines
- MIAT Mongolian Airlines
- Myanmar Airways International
- Rossiya Airlines
- Royal Brunei Airlines
- Saudia
- Scandinavian Airlines
- Shanghai Airlines
- SriLankan Airlines
- TAROM
- Uzbekistan Airways
- Vietnam Airlines
- Virgin Atlantic
- WestJet
- XiamenAir

=== Interline agreements ===
Korean Air has interline agreements with the following airlines:

- Air Premia
- flydubai
- JetBlue

Korean Air is also an airline partner of Skywards, the frequent-flyer program for Emirates. Skywards members can earn miles for flying Korean Air and can redeem miles for free flights.

== Fleet ==
=== Current fleet ===
As of January 2026, Korean Air operates the following aircraft:

Korean Air fleet
Aircraft	In service	Orders	Passengers				Notes
Aircraft	In service	Orders	F	J	Y	Total	Notes
Airbus A220-300	10	—	—	—	140	140	
Airbus A321neo	20	36	—	8	174	182	Order with 20 options.
Airbus A330-300	17	—	—	24	248	272	
Airbus A330-300	17	—	—	24	252	276	
Airbus A330-300	17	—	—	24	260	284	
Airbus A350-900	3	3	—	28	283	311	Deliveries started in January 2025.
Airbus A350-1000	—	20	TBA				
Airbus A380-800	6	—	12	94	301	407	Originally planned to be retired in 2026. Currently postponed.
Boeing 737-800	2	—	—	12	126	138	
Boeing 737-900	9	—	—	8	180	188	
Boeing 737-900ER	6	—	—	8	165	173	
Boeing 737 MAX 8	6	11	—	8	138	146	Order with 20 options.
Boeing 737 MAX 8	1	11	VIP				Leased to Republic of Korea Air Force as VIP transport.
Boeing 737 MAX 10	—	62	TBA				12 converted from Boeing 737 MAX 8. An additional 50 ordered on 25 August 2025.
Boeing 747-8I	4	—	6	48	314	368	Includes HL7644, the last passenger 747 ever built.
Boeing 747-8I	1	—	VIP				Leased to Republic of Korea Air Force as VIP transport.
Boeing 777-300	4	—	—	41	297	338	
Boeing 777-300ER	25	—	8	42	227	277	
Boeing 777-300ER	25	—	8	56	227	291	
Boeing 777-9	—	40	TBA				Deliveries from 2028.
Boeing 787-9	14	6	—	24	245	269	Order with 10 options. Order converted from Boeing 787-8.
Boeing 787-9	14	6	—	24	254	278	Order with 10 options. Order converted from Boeing 787-8.
Boeing 787-10	12	53	—	36	289	325	Order with 10 options.
Korean Air Cargo fleet
Airbus A350F	—	7	Cargo				
Boeing 747-400ERF	4	—	Cargo				
Boeing 747-8F	7	—	Cargo				
Boeing 777F	12	—	Cargo				
Boeing 777-8F	—	8	Cargo				Deliveries from 2030.
Korean Air Business Jet fleet
AgustaWestland AW139	4	—	8–14				
Airbus Helicopters H160-B	1	—	6				
Boeing 737-700/BBJ1	1	—	16–26				
Boeing 787-8/BBJ	1	—	39				
Bombardier Global Express XRS	1	—	13				
Gulfstream G650ER	1	—	13				
Gulfstream G800	1	—	13				
Sikorsky S-76C+	1	—	5–6				
Total	174	246					

=== Fleet development ===
At the Association of Asia Pacific Airlines Assembly in 2018, Korean Air announced that it was considering a new large wide-body aircraft order to replace older Airbus A330, Boeing 747-400, Boeing 777-200ER, and Boeing 777-300 aircraft. Types under consideration for replacement of older wide-body aircraft in the fleet included the Boeing 777X and Airbus A350 XWB. At the International Air Transport Association Annual General Meeting (IATA AGM) in Seoul, Chairman Walter Cho said Korean Air's wide-body order is imminent and it is considering an extra order of Airbus A220 aircraft, including the developing version Airbus A220-500.

In 2022, Korean Air was considering ordering a new freighter to continue to support the cargo demand worldwide. Chairman of Korean Air Walter Cho said KAL is considering two options. Three years later, on 25 August 2025, the freighter choice was finalized with an order for eight Boeing 777-8F aircraft.

=== Gallery ===
Korean Air current fleet

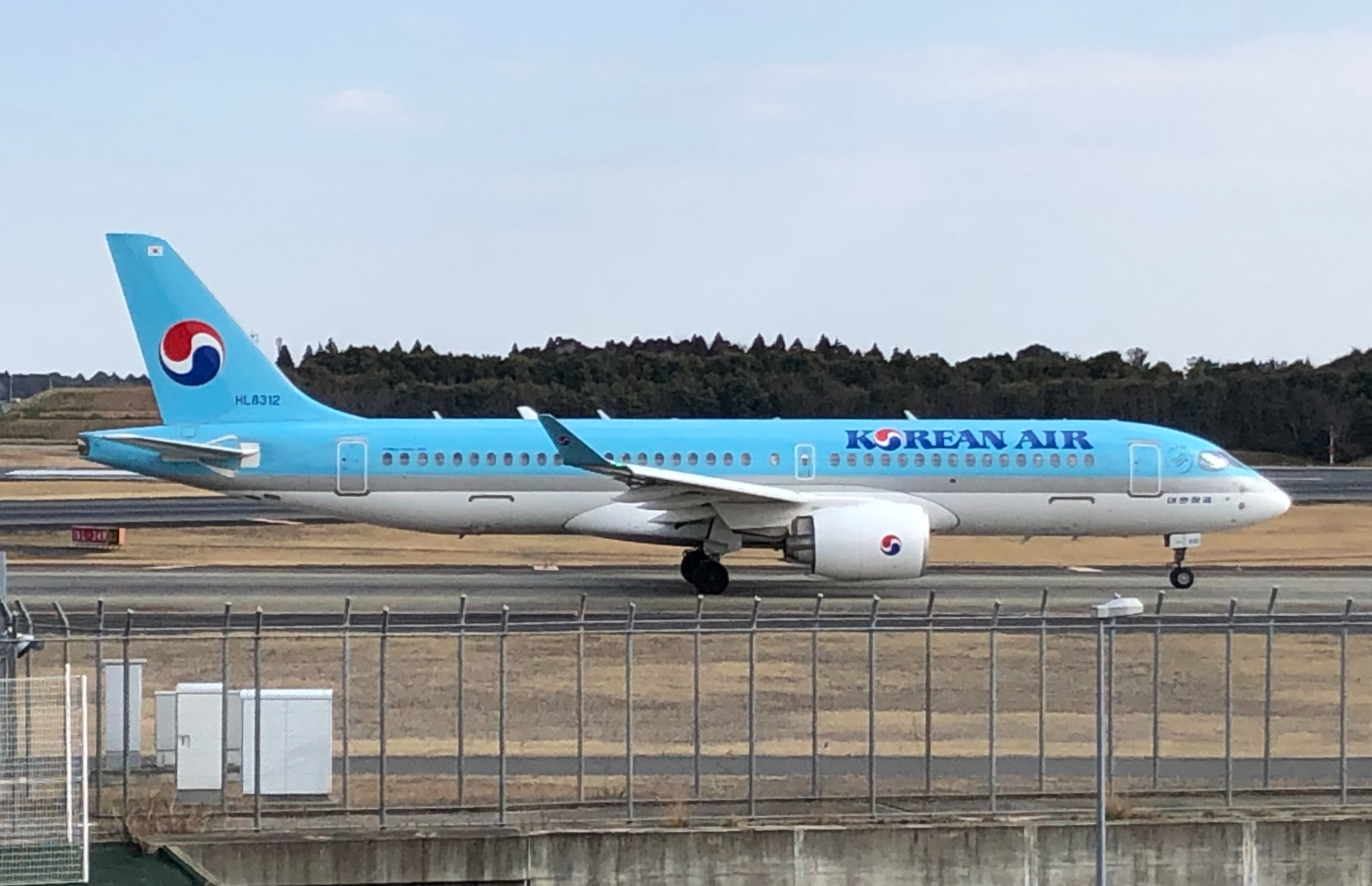
Airbus A220-300

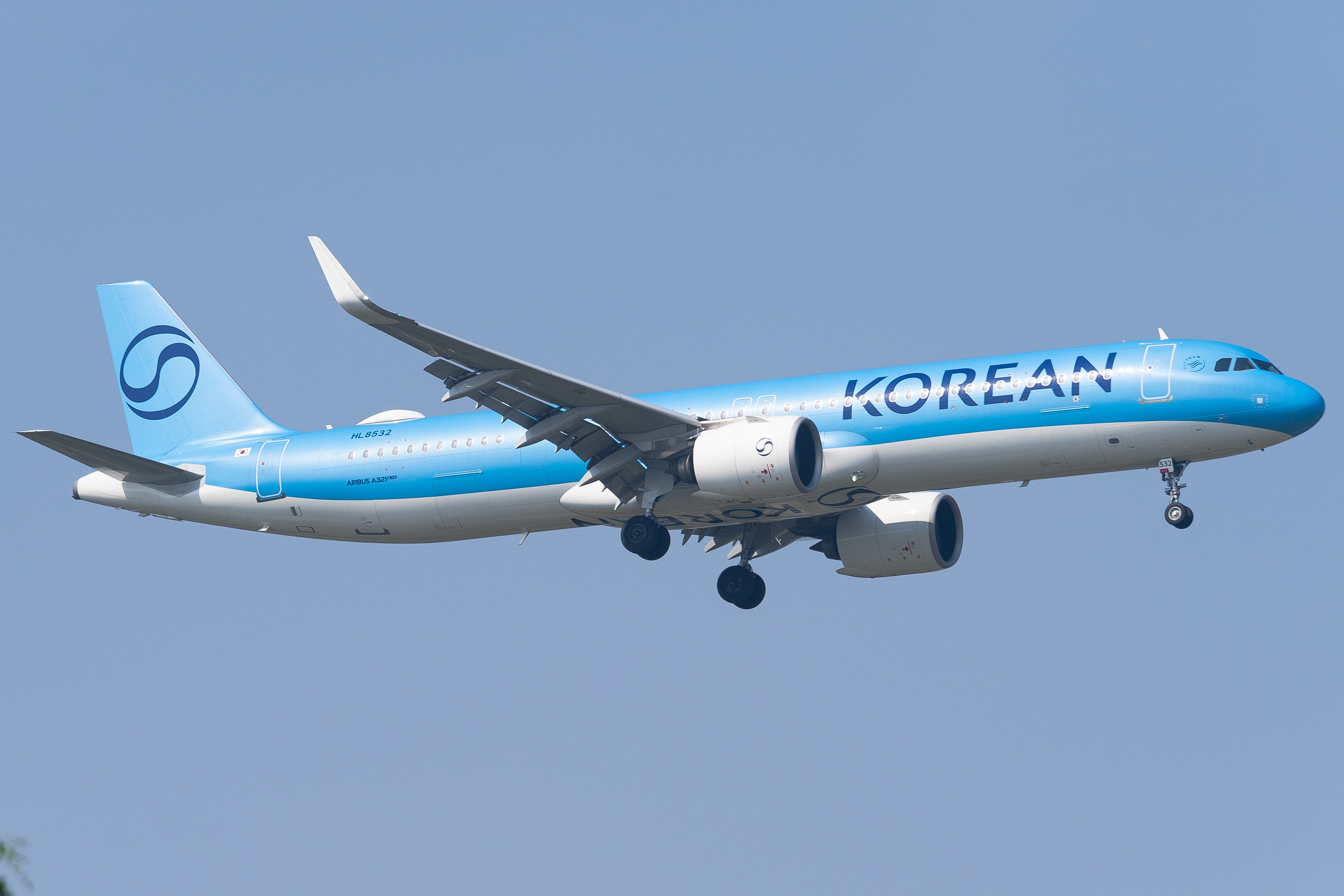
Airbus A321neo

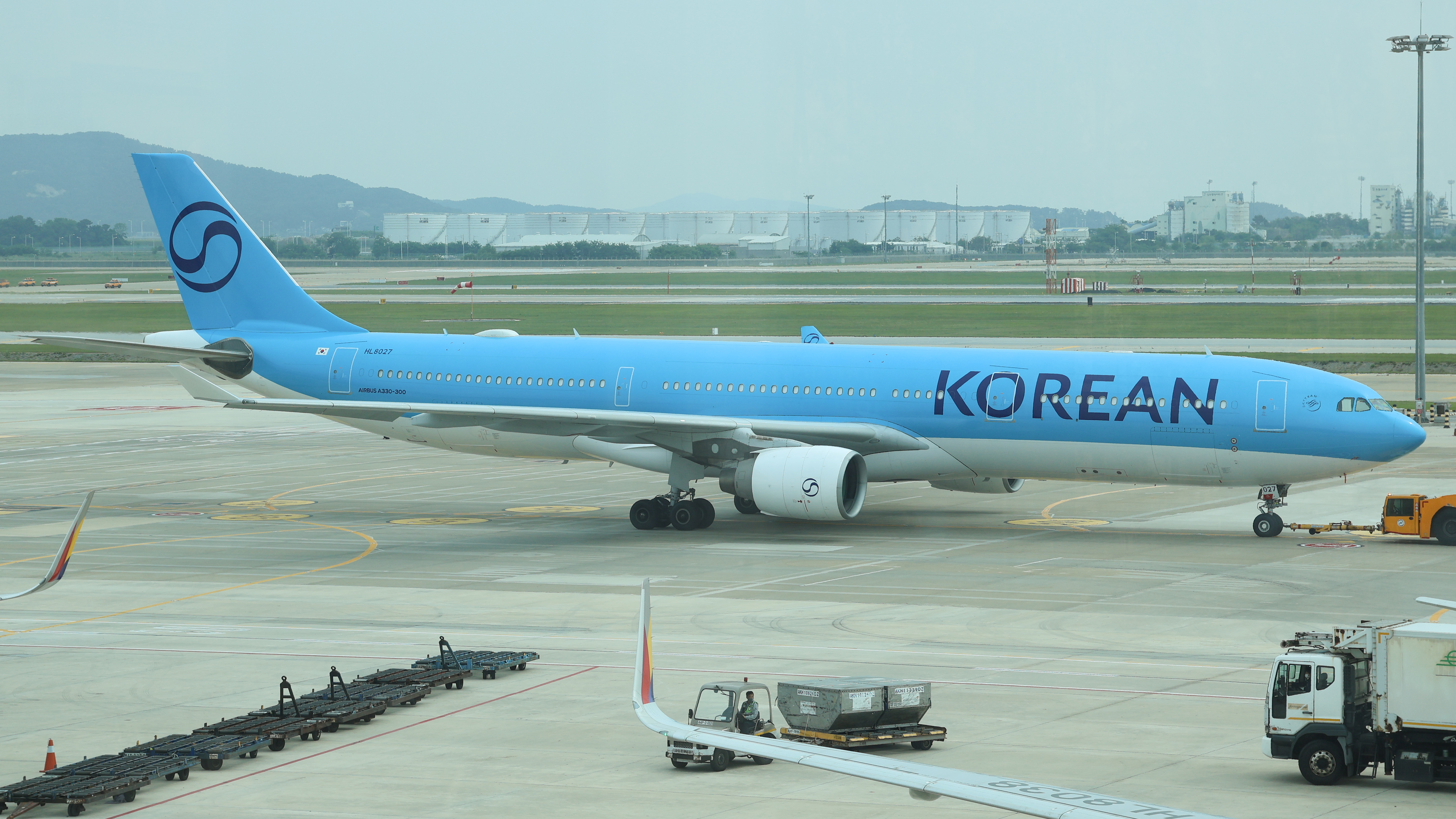
Airbus A330-300

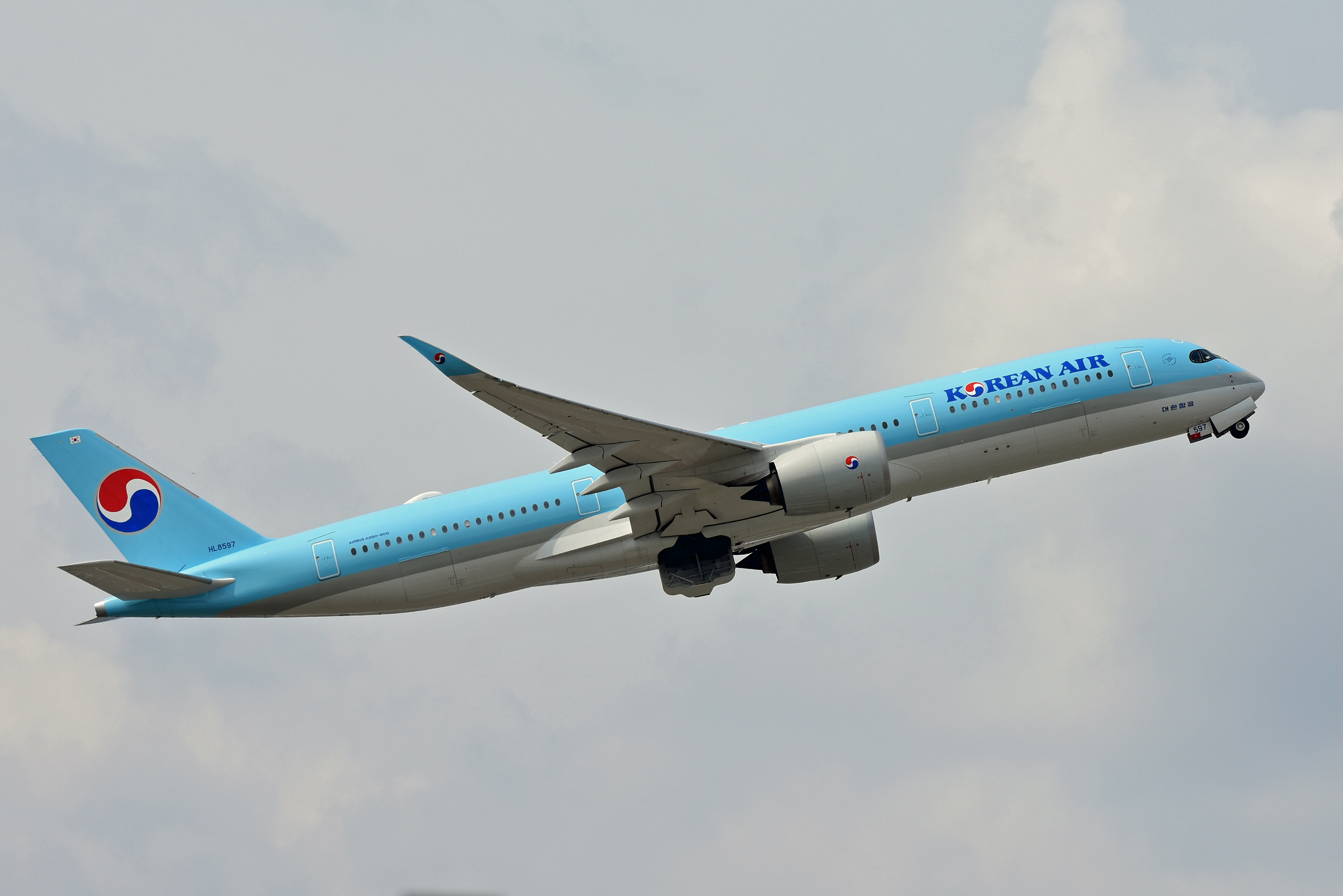
Airbus A350-900

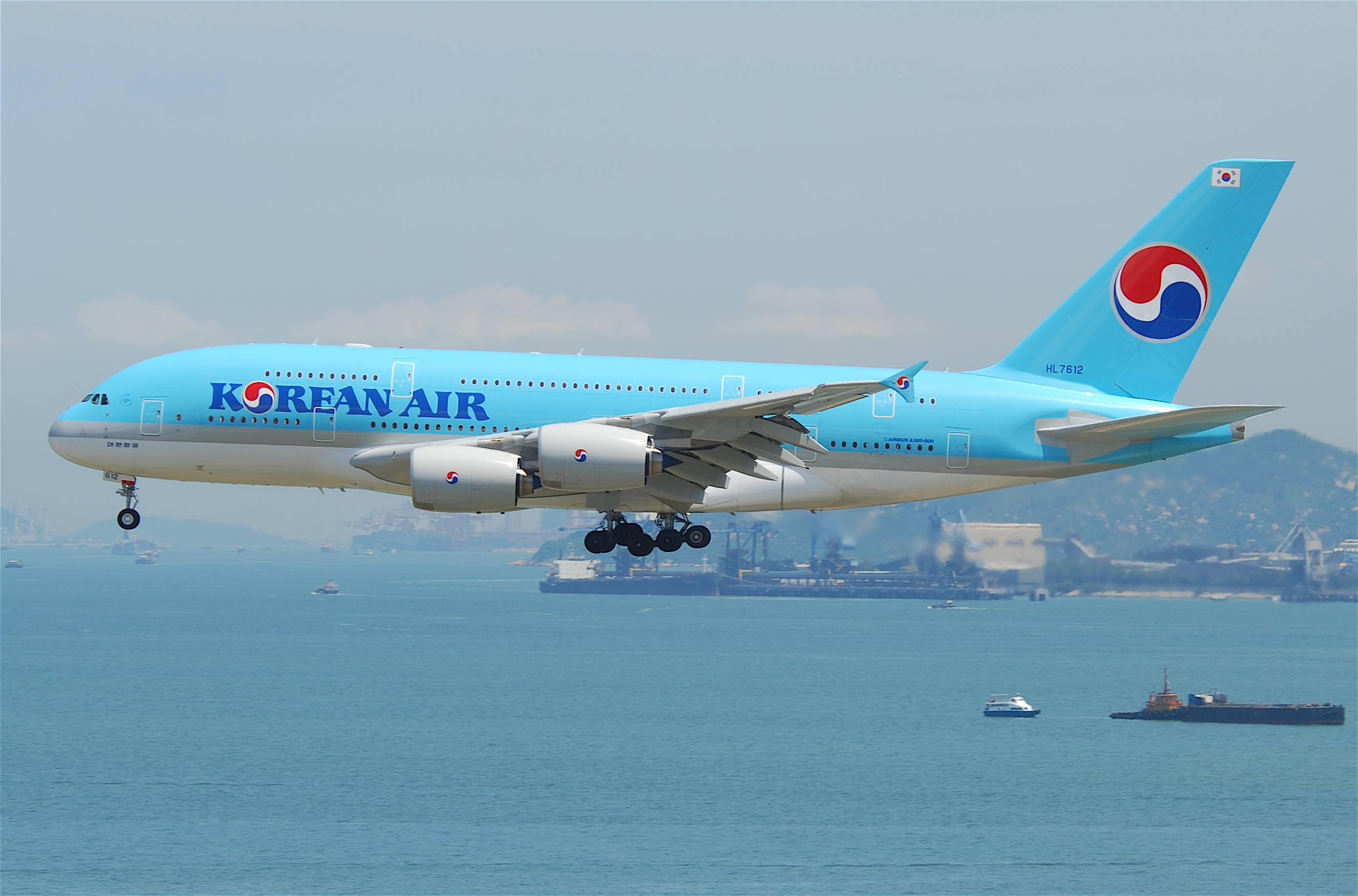
Airbus A380-800

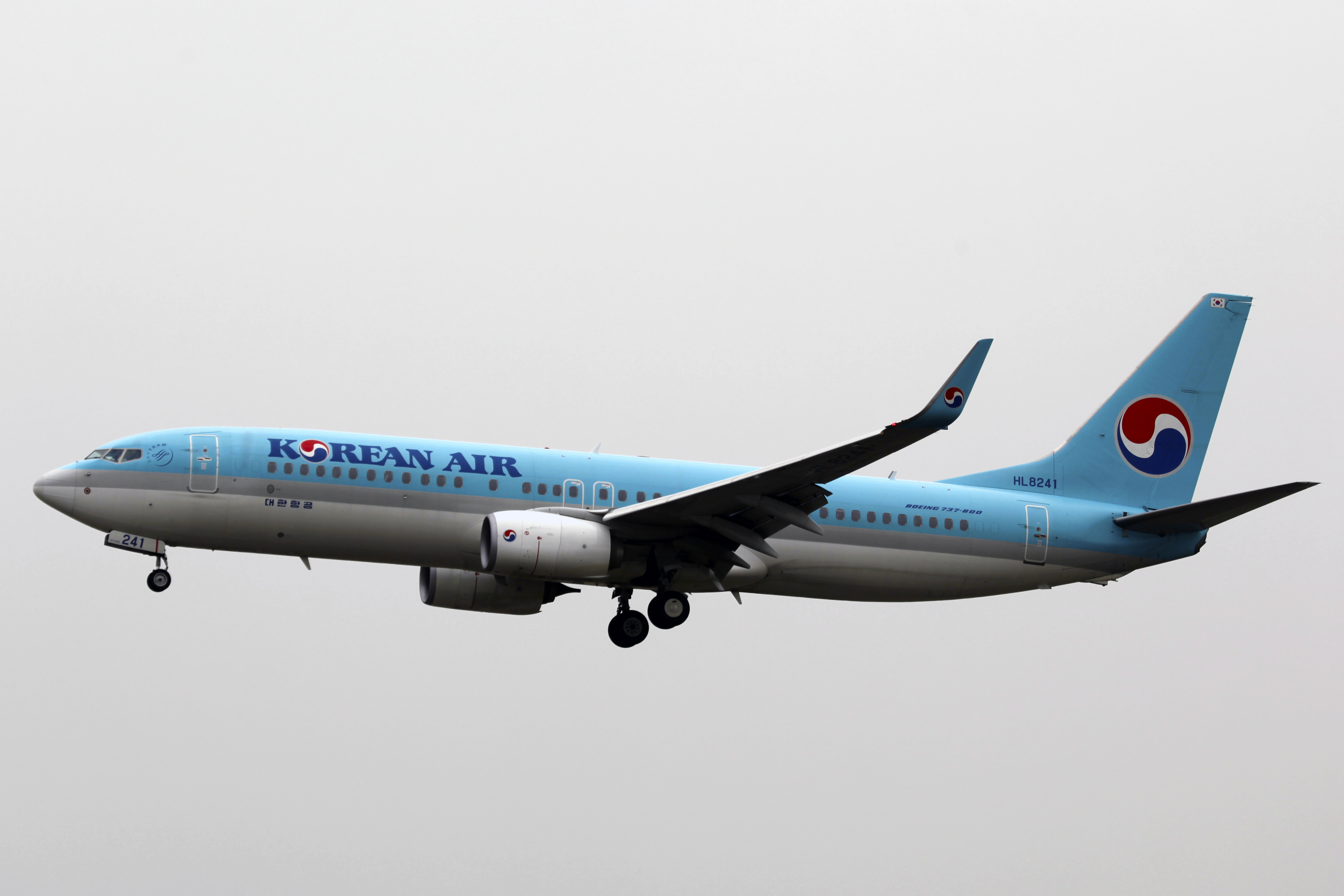
Boeing 737-800

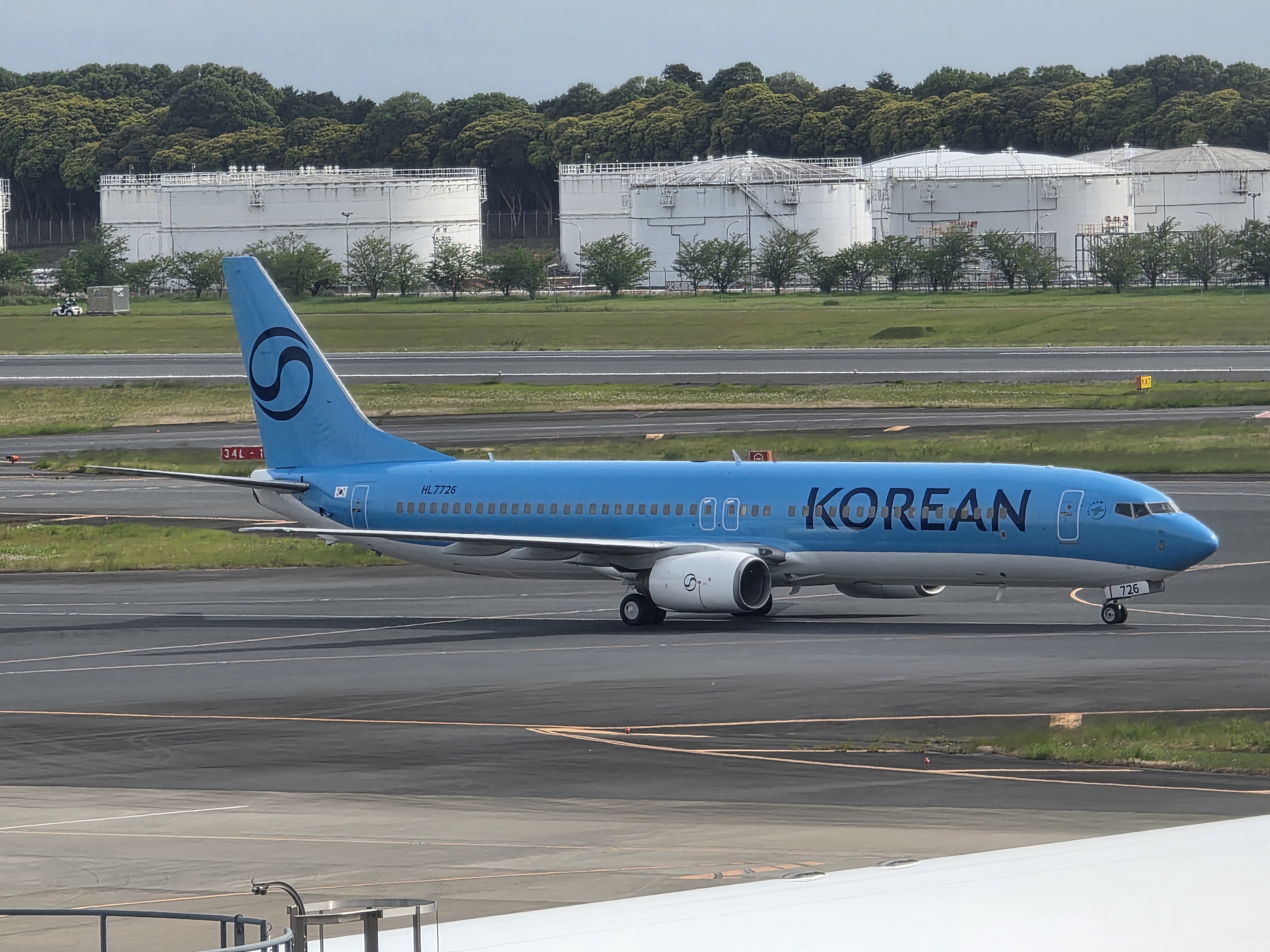
Boeing 737-900

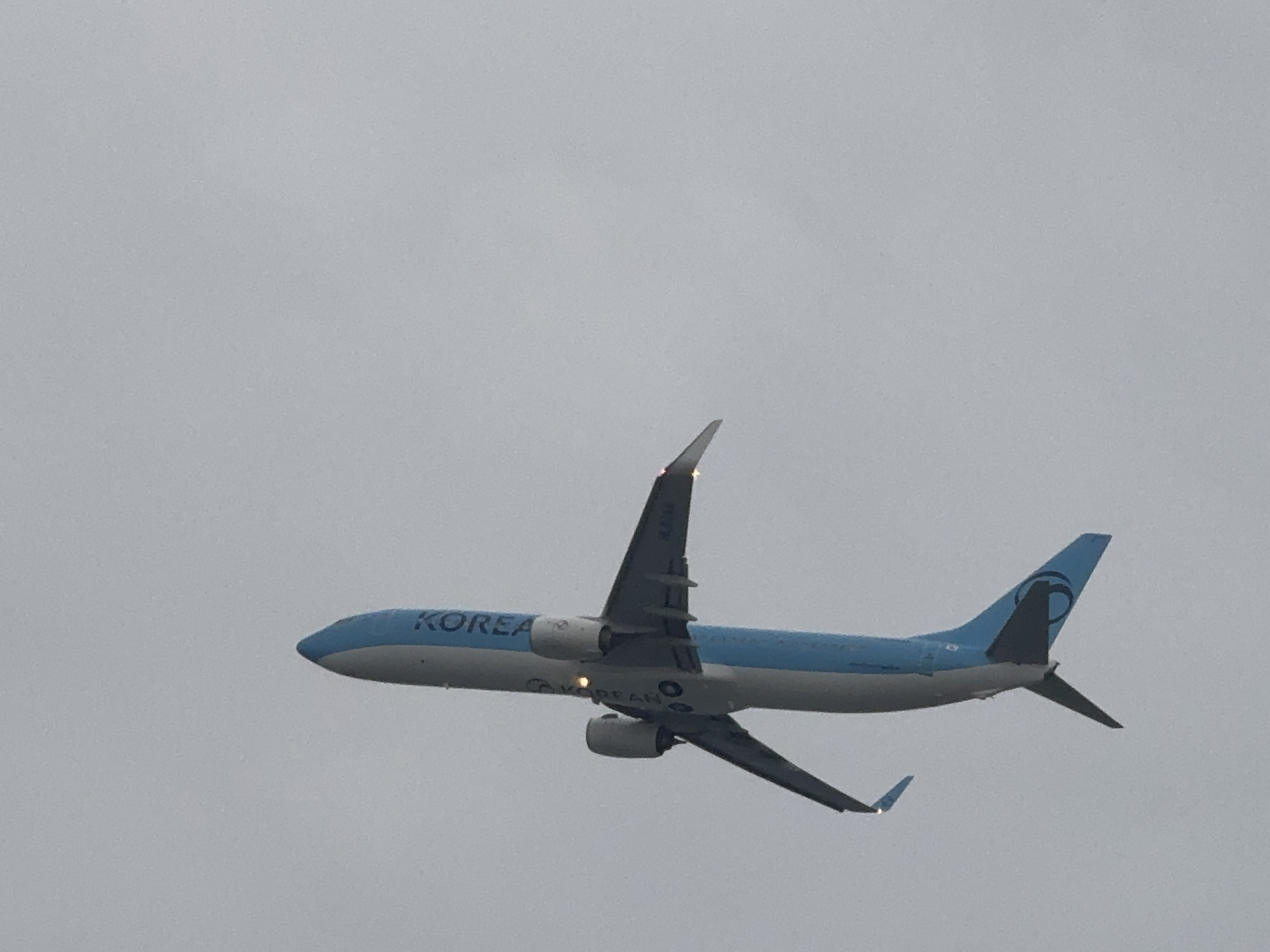
Boeing 737-900ER

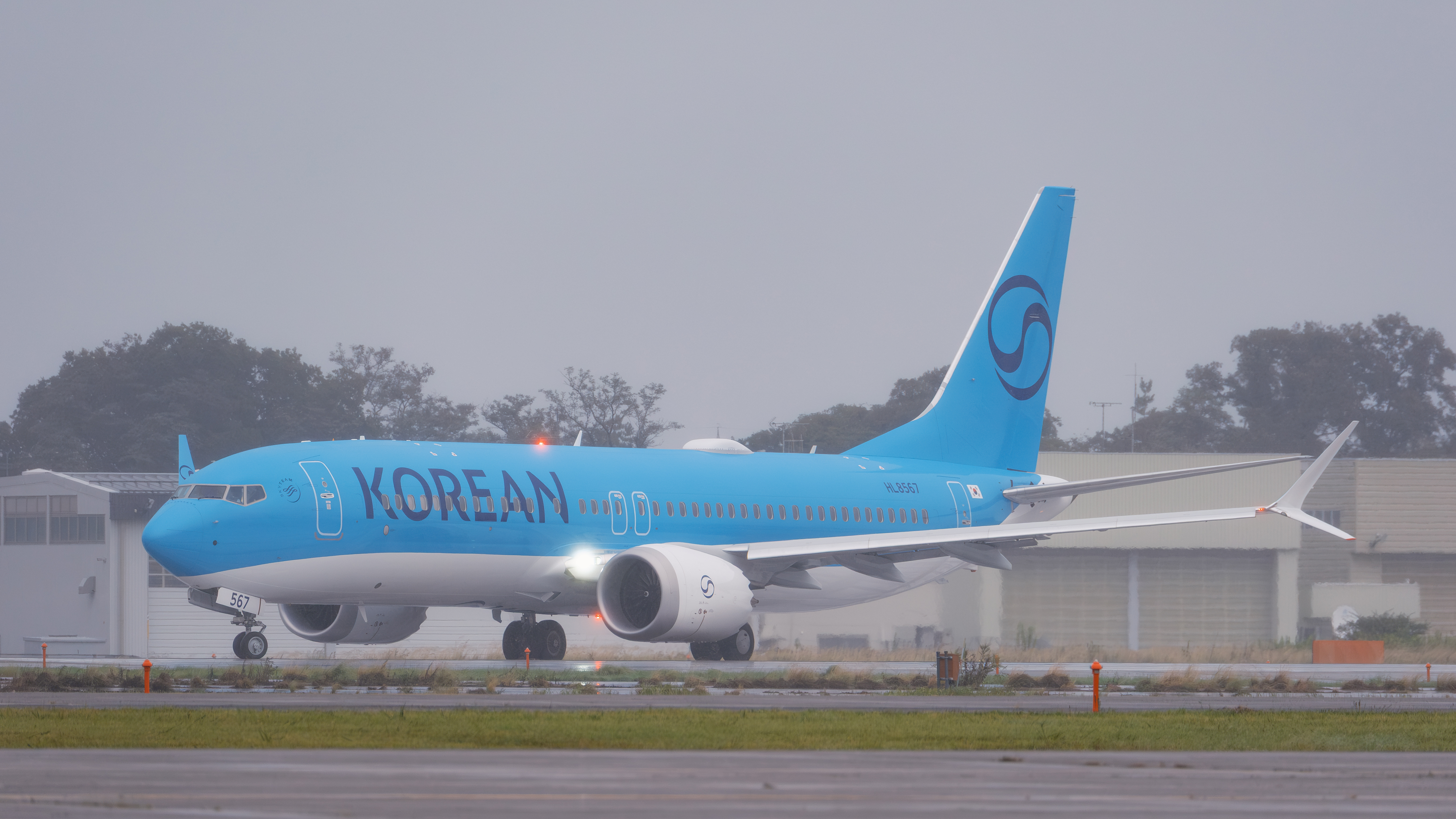
Boeing 737 MAX 8

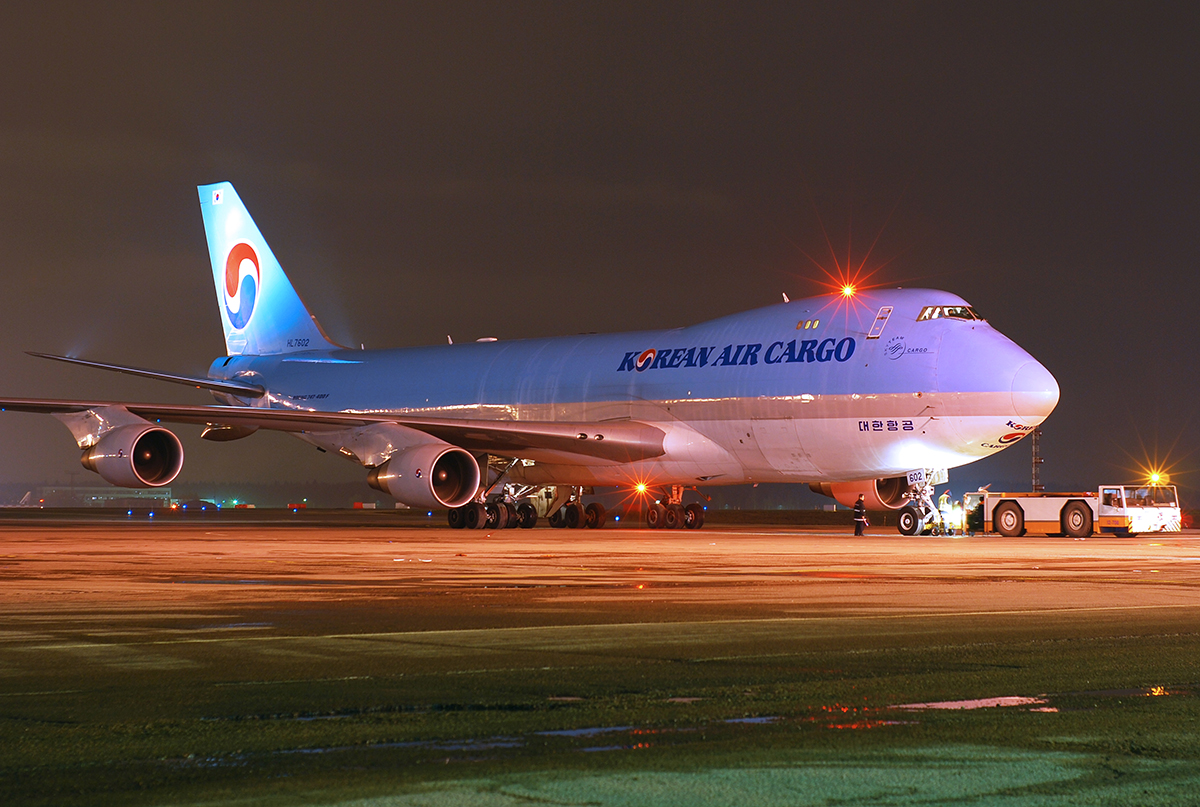
Boeing 747-400ERF

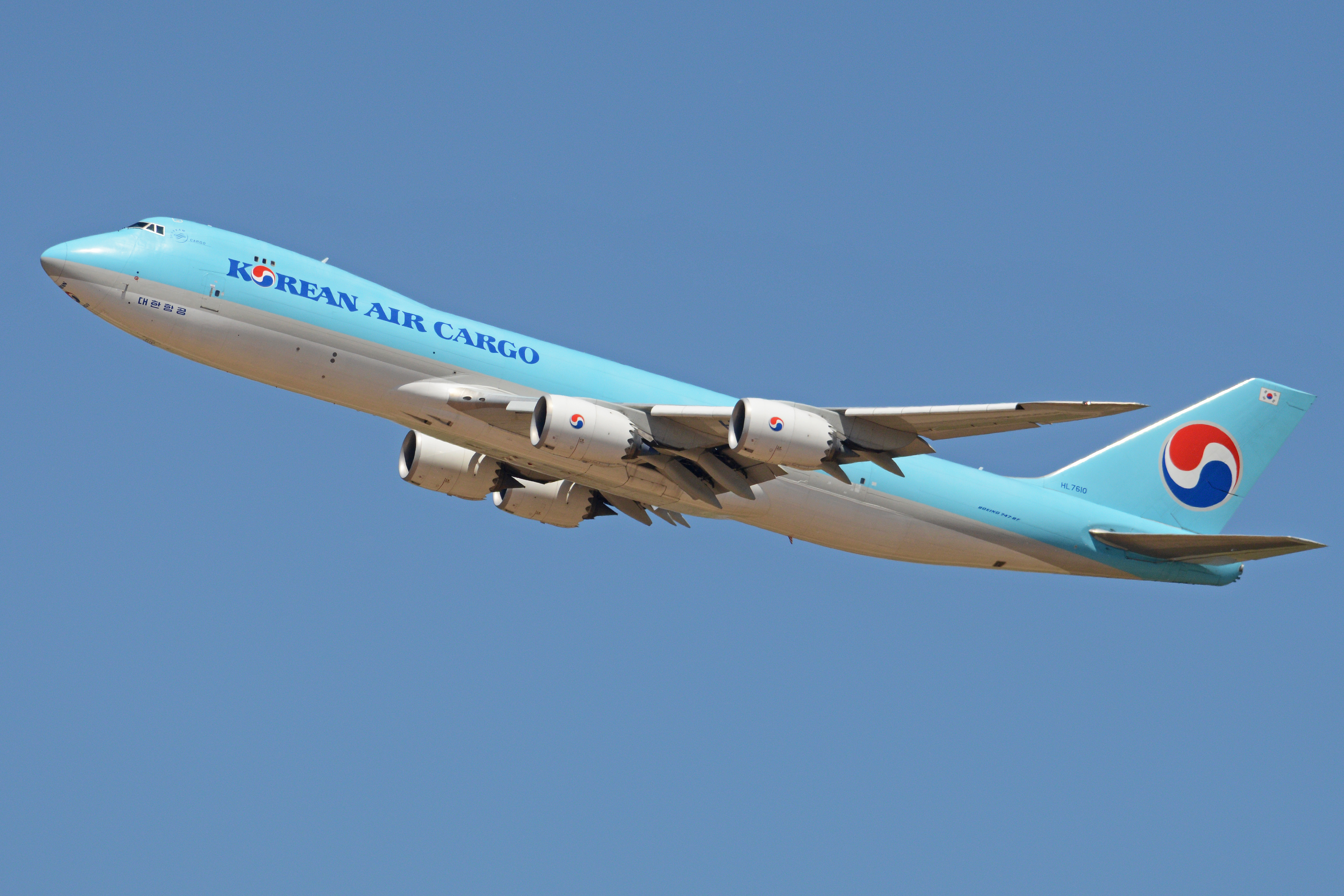
Boeing 747-8F

Boeing 747-8

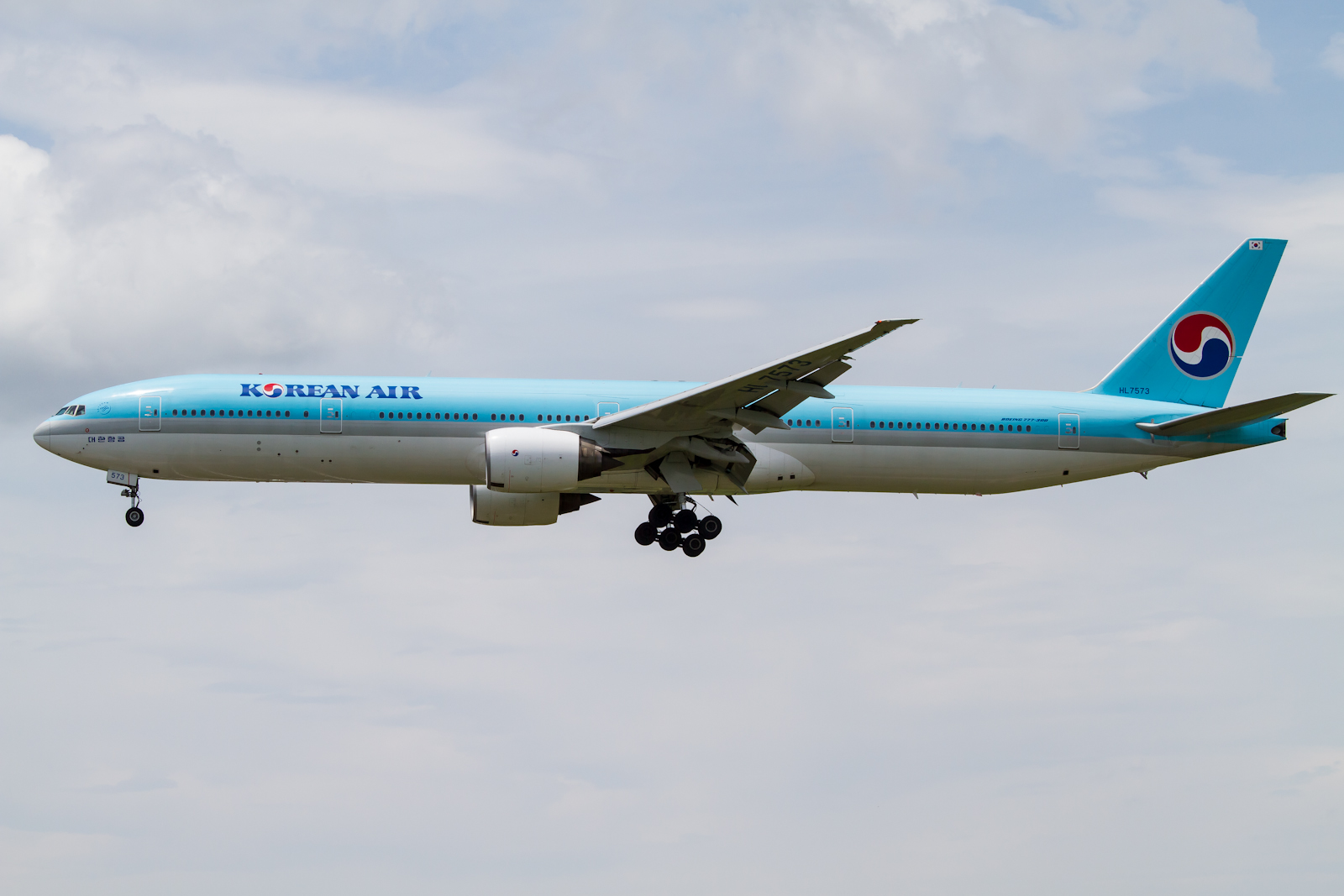
Boeing 777-300

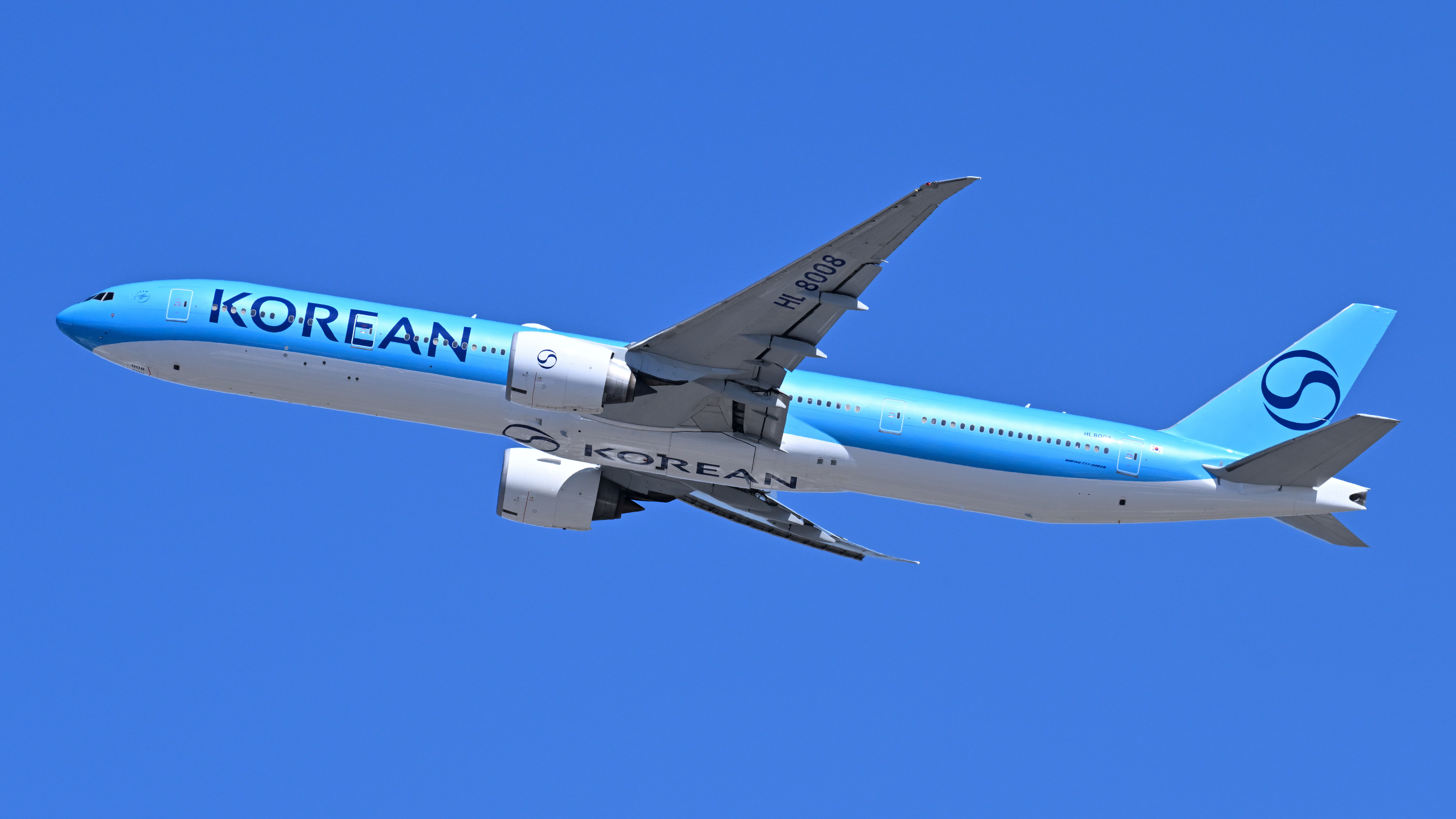
Boeing 777-300ER

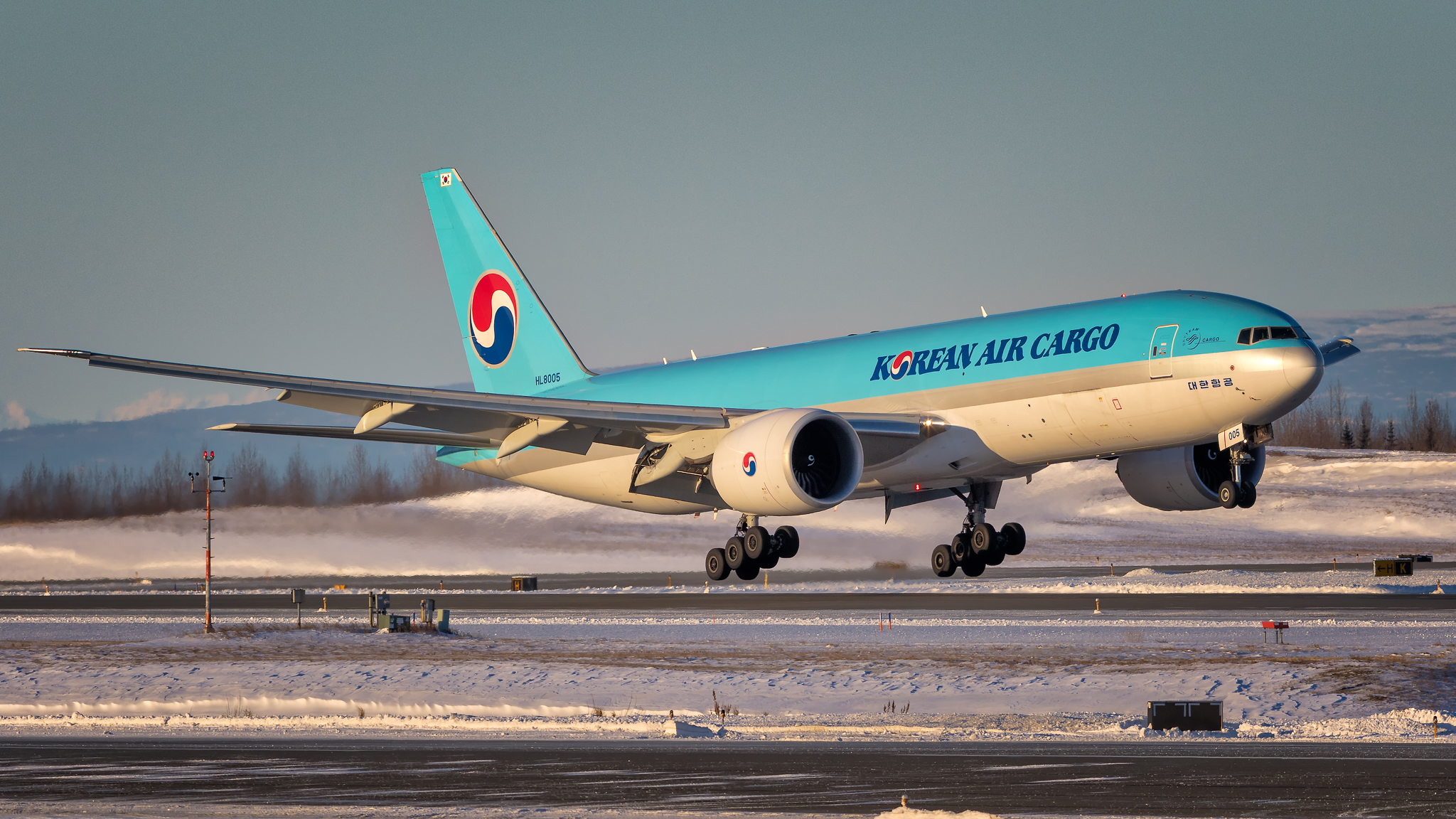
Boeing 777F

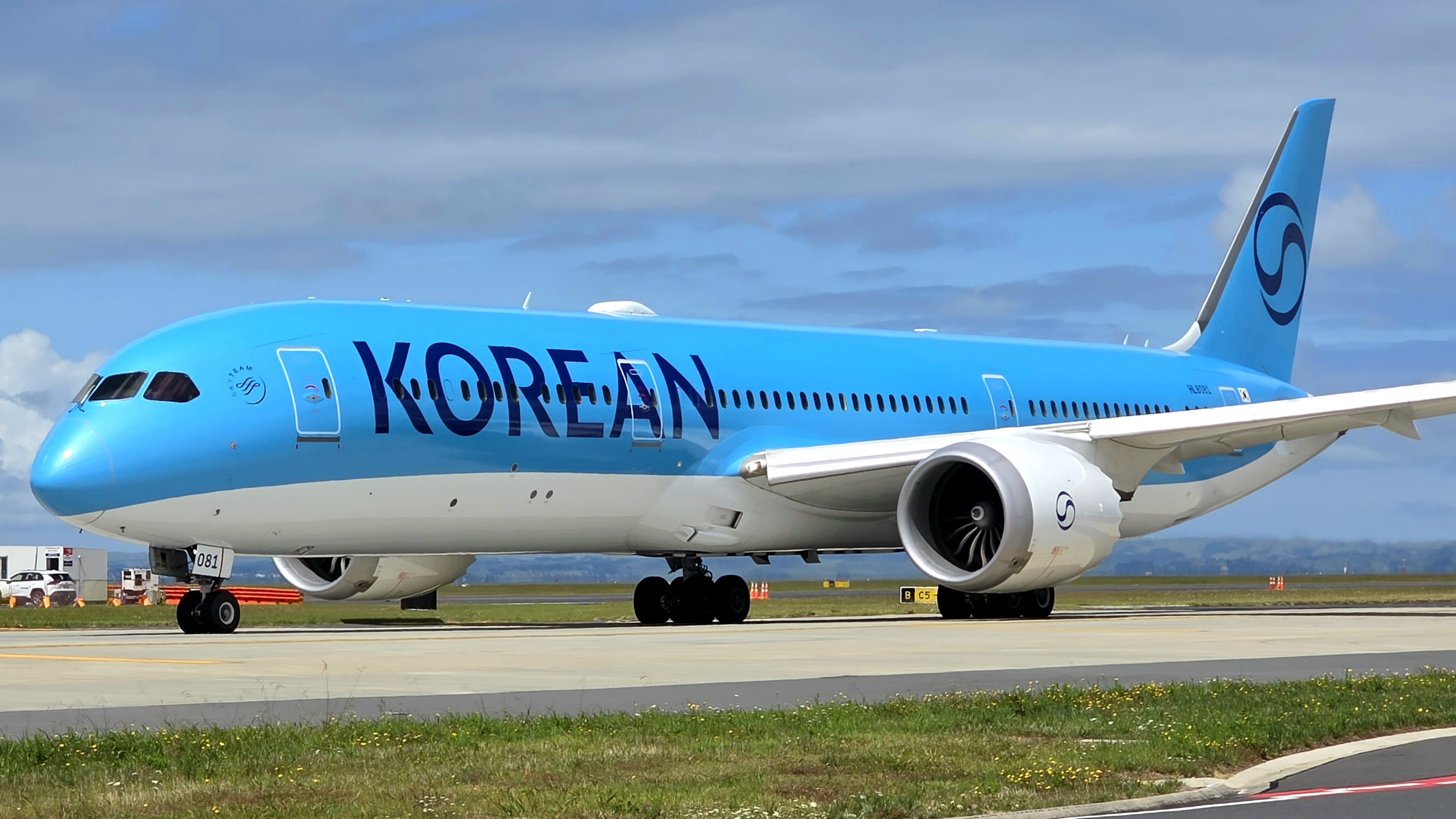
Boeing 787-9

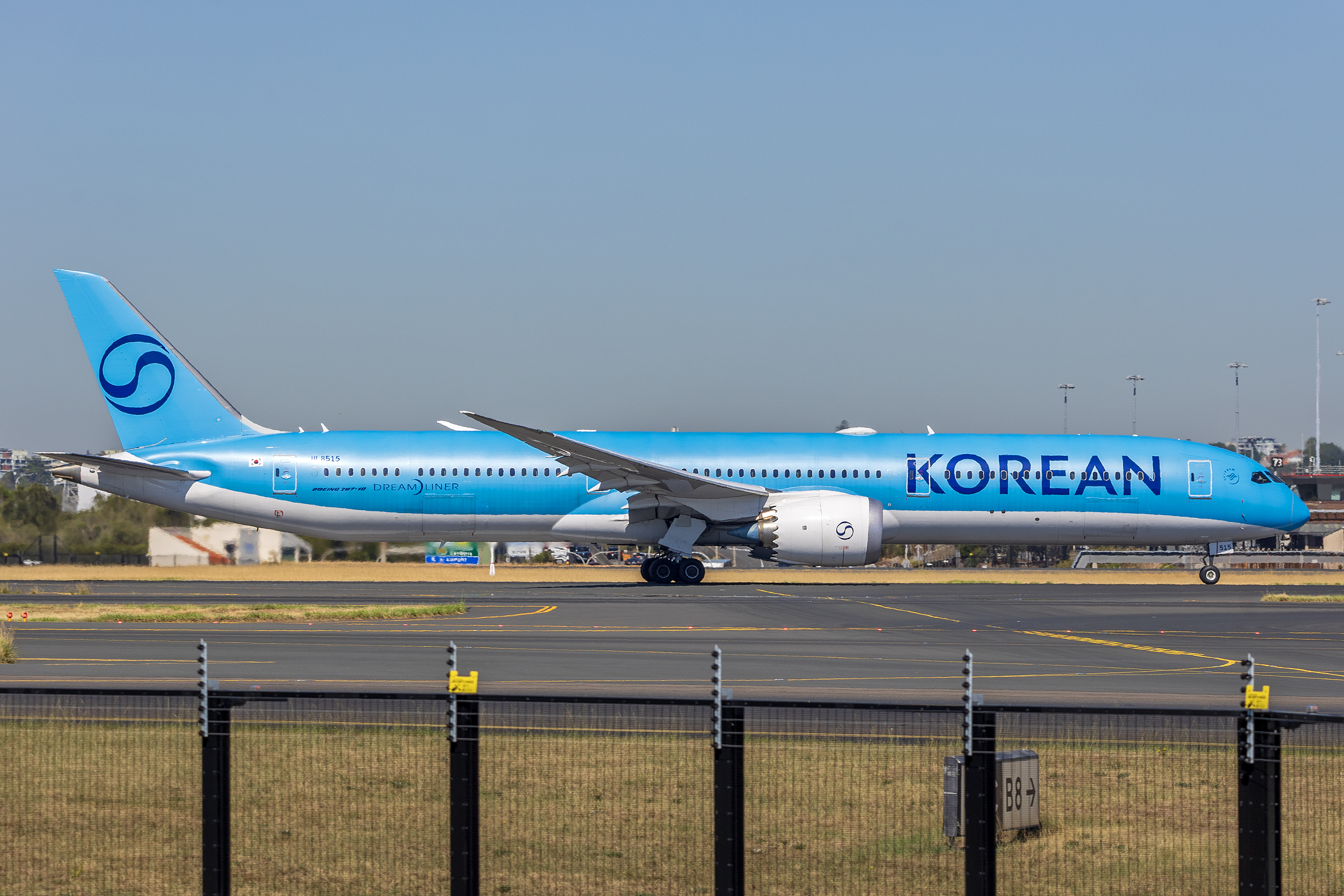
Boeing 787-10

=== Retired fleet ===
Korean Air has operated the following aircraft:

Korean Air retired fleet
Aircraft	Total	Introduced	Retired	Replacement	Notes
Airbus A300B4-2C	8	1975	1997	Airbus A330	
Airbus A300B4-200F	2	1986	2000	None	
Airbus A300-600R	27	1987	2014	Airbus A330	
Airbus A300-600R	2	1987	2014	Airbus A330	Converted into freighters and transferred to Korean Air Cargo.
Airbus A300-600R	1	1987	1994	None	Crashed as flight KE2033.
Airbus A330-200	3	1998	2025	Boeing 787 Dreamliner	
Airbus A330-200	6	1998	2025	Boeing 787 Dreamliner	Leased to T'way Air.
Boeing 707-320B	4	1971	1989	Boeing 747-200B	
Boeing 707-320B	1	1971	1978	None	Shot down as flight KE902.
Boeing 707-320C	7	1971	1990	Boeing 747-200B	
Boeing 707-320C	1	1971	1987	None	Destroyed as flight KE858.
Boeing 720	2	1969	1977	Boeing 747-200B	
Boeing 727-100	5	1972	1980	McDonnell Douglas MD-80	
Boeing 727-200	12	1980	1996	McDonnell Douglas MD-80	
Boeing 737-700/BBJ1	1	2008		None	
Boeing 747-200B	9	1973	1998	Boeing 747-400	
Boeing 747-200B	2	1973	1998	Boeing 747-400	Converted into freighters and transferred to Korean Air Cargo.
Boeing 747-200B	1	1973	1983	None	Shot down as flight KE007.
Boeing 747-200B	1	1973	1980	None	Destroyed as flight KE015.
Boeing 747-200C	2	1973	2000	None	
Boeing 747-200F	7	1978	2006	Boeing 747-400F	
Boeing 747-200F	1	1978	1999	None	Crashed as flight KE8509.
Boeing 747-200SF	2	1991	2002	Boeing 747-400F	
Boeing 747-300	1	1984	2005	Boeing 747-400	
Boeing 747-300	1	1984	1997	None	Crashed as flight KE801.
Boeing 747-300M	1	1988	2001	Boeing 747-400M	Converted into freighters and transferred to Korean Air Cargo.
Boeing 747-300SF	1	2001	2006	Boeing 747-400F	
Boeing 747-400	17	1989	2020	Airbus A380-800; Boeing 747-8I	
Boeing 747-400	8	1989	2007	Airbus A380-800; Boeing 747-8I	Converted into freighters and transferred to Korean Air Cargo.
Boeing 747-400	1	1989	1998	None	Crashed as flight KE8702.
Boeing 747-400	1	2001	2010	None	Leased to Republic of Korea Air Force for VIP transport until 2021.
Boeing 747-400BCF	8	2007	2014	Boeing 777F	
Boeing 747-400ERF	4	2003	2017	Boeing 777F	
Boeing 747-400F	10	1996	2018	Boeing 777F	
Boeing 747-400M	1	1990	2010	Boeing 777-300ER	
Boeing 747SP	2	1981	1998	Boeing 777-200ER	
Boeing 777-200ER	14	1997	2025	Airbus A350-900	
Boeing 777-200ER	4	2005	2016	Airbus A350-900	Transferred to subsidiary Jin Air.
Bombardier Global Express XRS	2	2011	2017	None	
CASA C-212	1	1980	2000	None	
Douglas DC-3	2	1950	1970	Unknown	
Douglas DC-4	2	1953	1969	Unknown	
Douglas DC-8-60	6	1972	1976	Boeing 707	
Eurocopter EC135-P2+	5	2011	2018	None	
Eurocopter EC155-B1	2	2004	2018	None	
Fairchild-Hiller FH-227	2	1967	1970	NAMC YS-11A-200	
Fokker F27-200	3	1963	1980	Fokker F27-500	
Fokker F27-500	3	1969	1991	Fokker F28-4000	
Fokker F27-600	1	1982	1986	Fokker F28-4000	
Fokker F28-4000	3	1984	1993	Fokker 100	
Fokker F28-4000	1	1984	1989	None	Crashed as flight KE175.
Fokker 100	12	1992	2004	Boeing 737-800	
Gulfstream IV	1	1994	2012	Boeing BBJ1	
Lockheed L-749A Constellation	Unknown	Unknown	Unknown	None	
Lockheed L-1049H Super Constellation	3	1966	1967	None	
McDonnell Douglas DC-9-32	2	1967	1972	Boeing 727	
McDonnell Douglas DC-10-30	4	1975	1996	McDonnell Douglas MD-11	
McDonnell Douglas DC-10-30	1	1975	1989	None	Crashed as flight KE803.
McDonnell Douglas DC-10-30CF	1	1978	1983	None	Crashed as flight KE084.
McDonnell Douglas MD-11	5	1991	1995	Airbus A330	Converted into freighters and transferred to Korean Air Cargo.
McDonnell Douglas MD-11F	4	1995	2005	Boeing 747-400BCF	
McDonnell Douglas MD-11F	1	1995	1999	None	Crashed as flight KE6316.
McDonnell Douglas MD-82	9	1993	2001	Boeing 737 Next Generation	
McDonnell Douglas MD-83	6	1994	2001	Boeing 737 Next Generation	
McDonnell Douglas MD-83	1	1994	1999	None	Crashed as flight KE1533.
NAMC YS-11A-200	6	1968	1976	Boeing 727	
NAMC YS-11A-200	1	1968	1969	None	Hijacked and captured by North Korea.

== Services ==
=== Cabins ===
Korean Air currently offers two types of first class, three types of business (Prestige) class, and one standard economy class, with First Class seats installed on all of its Airbus A380-800s, Boeing 747-8Is, and Boeing 777-300ERs. The airline markets Business Class as "Prestige Class", with Prestige class seats in some aircraft equipped as doored suites. The airline announced its introduction of Premium Economy in 2017. The first aircraft equipped with premium economy marketed as "Economy Plus Class" was CS300 (Airbus A220-300). The premium economy product was eliminated in 2019 due to discordance of service and profit loss, but is set to be reintroduced through a retrofit of Boeing 777-300ER aircraft with the older "Prestige Sleeper" business class product and marketed as "Premium Class" instead of "Economy Plus Class". The airline also offers Economy Class.

=== In-flight catering ===
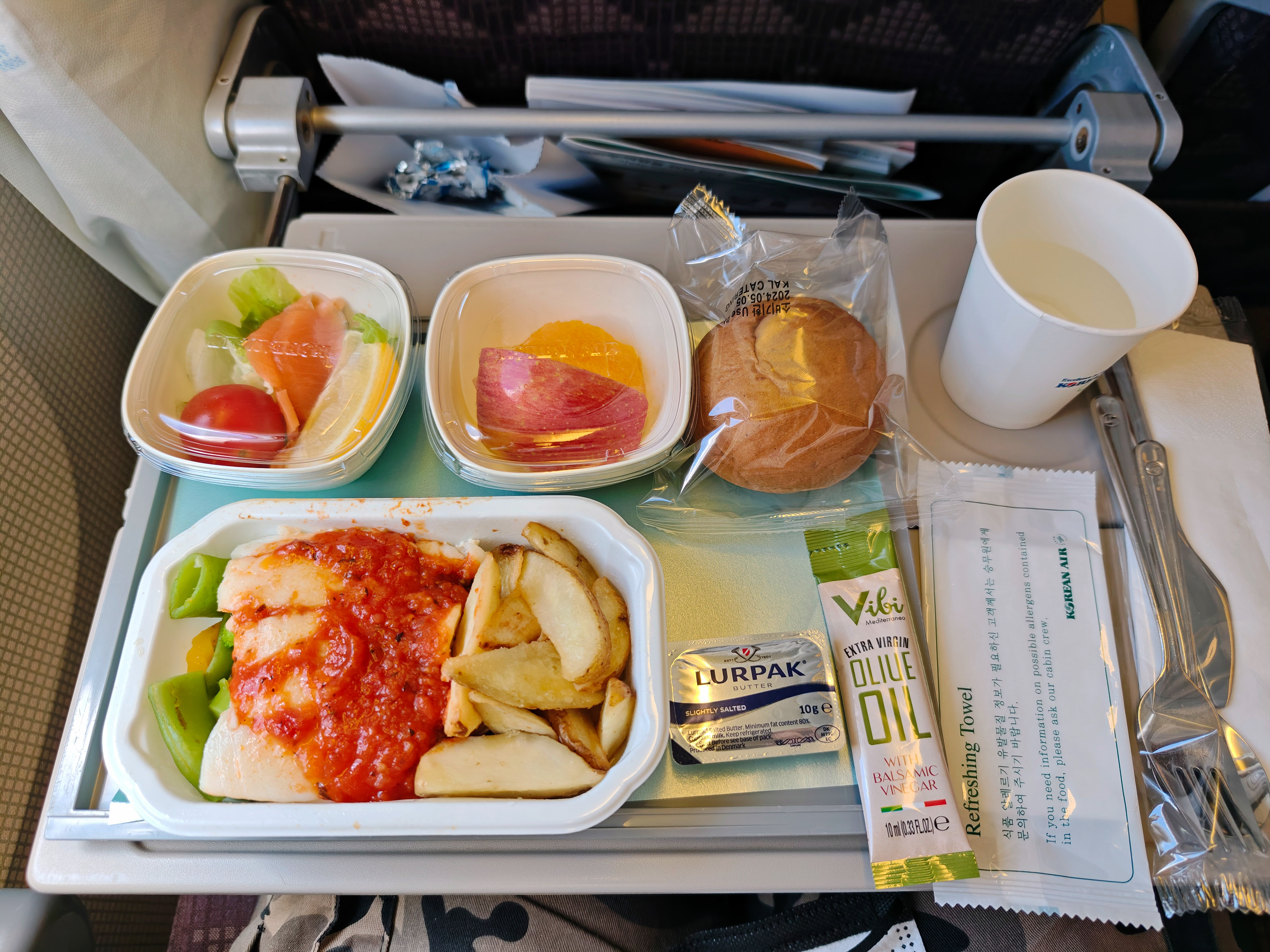
A meal served in Korean Air's Economy Class

Korean Air offers a diverse in-flight catering service, providing passengers with a selection of both traditional Korean dishes and Western meals. The airlines also provides Chinese cuisine on certain flights. The specific offerings can vary depending on the flight route and class of service. In Economy Class, passengers can enjoy Korean options like bibimbap, served with gochujang and sesame oil, or bulgogi rice, while Western selections include grilled beef tenderloin and roasted cod. Chinese options include stir-fried snapper with chilli sauce. Prestige Class (Business Class) enhances these offerings with options such as tuna bibimbap, Korean spicy seafood stew and upgraded versions of Western meals with enhanced presentation and sides. Stir-fried ling fish with oyster sauce is available as one of the Chinese options.

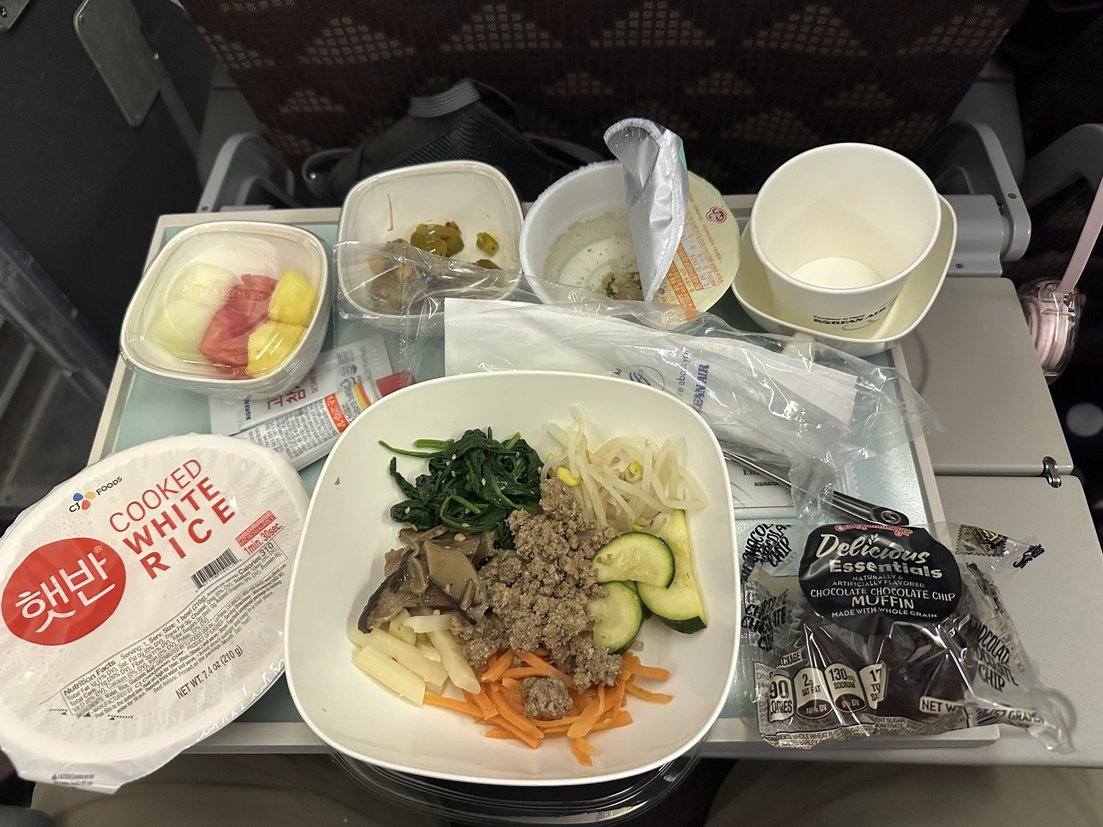
Bibimbap served onboard a Korean Air flight from Seattle to Seoul

First Class provides premium dishes such as Korean spicy pork, spicy beef short ribs with bulgogi sauce, and braised pork belly. Western options include veal chop with Madeira sauce, seared monkfish with orang teriyaki sauce, and sirloin steak. Previously, Korean Air offered instant cup noodles as a mid-flight snack in Economy Class. However, due to safety concerns related to turbulence, this option has been discontinued. However, in Business and First Class cabins, the option to order instant noodles remains available. Alternative snacks such as pizza, sandwiches, corn dogs, and hot pockets are now available at a snack bar for Economy Class passengers.

In 2025, Korean Air collaborated with Inha University and updated their special dietary meals by introducing new selections for low-fat, diabetic and low-calorie meals, bland meals, gluten intolerant meals, low-salt meals, and low-lactose meals.

=== In-flight entertainment ===
Korean Air's business class offers high-quality in-flight entertainment with large personal screens, varying by aircraft. The Boeing 787-10 Dreamliner features 23.8-inch UHD monitors, while the Airbus A321neo has 24-inch 4K screens with Bluetooth support. Other aircraft, like the Boeing 777 and 787-9, have 15.4-inch to 18-inch screens, depending on the seat type.

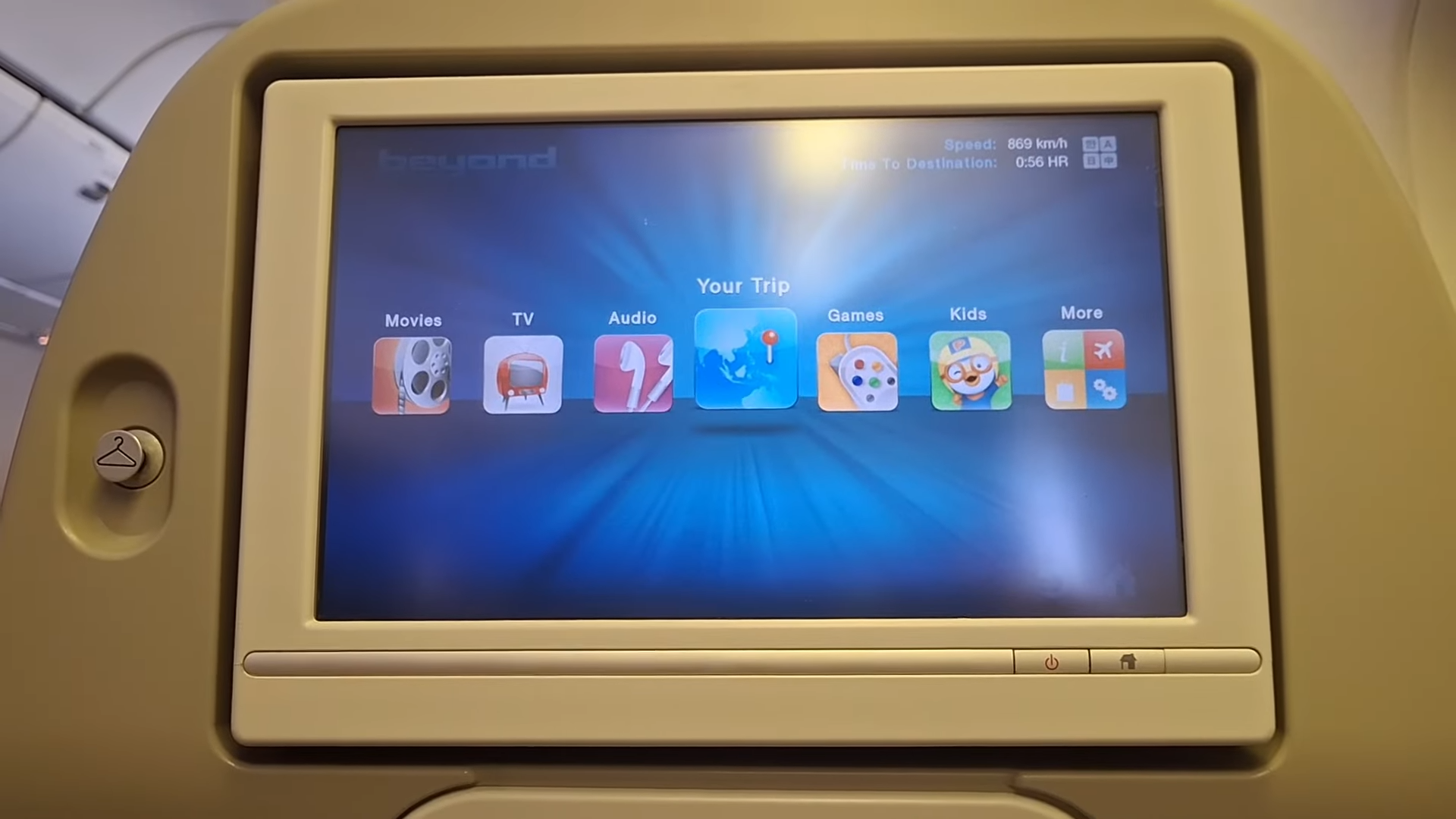
The In-Flight entertainment screen onboard a Korean Air Boeing 777-300ER

The entertainment system provides a diverse selection of movies, TV shows, dramas, music (including K-pop and classical), and interactive games. Some aircraft offer Bluetooth connectivity for wireless headphones and Wi-Fi for internet access.

== Awards ==
- 2020 Skytrax Awards - 5-Star Airline Rating
- 2021 Airline of the Year - Air Transport World (ATW)
- 2022 Cargo Airline of the Year Award - AirlineRatings.com
- 2022 Cargo Operator of the Year - Air Transport World (ATW)
- 2023 Best Business-Class Seat Design - Global Traveler's Tested Reader Survey Awards
- 2023 Best Airline Cuisine - Global Traveler's Tested Reader Survey Awards
- 2023 Best Frequent-Flyer Redemption Award (SKYPASS) - Global Traveler's Tested Reader Survey Awards
- 2024 Best Airline Onboard Service award - Global Traveler's Tested Reader Survey Awards
- 2025 Airline of the Year - AirlineRatings.com
- 2026 five gold and three silver awards - 2026 Magellan Awards

== Incidents and accidents ==
Safety has significantly improved since the 1990s as the airline has made concerted efforts to improve standards in the early 21st century. In 2001, the Federal Aviation Administration upgraded Korea's air-safety rating while Korean Air passed an International Air Transport Association audit in 2005.

Between 1970 and 1999, many fatal incidents occurred. Since 1970, 17 Korean Air aircraft have been written off in serious incidents and accidents, with the loss of 700 lives. Two Korean Air aircraft were shot down by the Soviet Union for violating Soviet airspace, one operating as Korean Air Lines Flight 902 and the other as Korean Air Lines Flight 007.

Korean Air's deadliest incident was Flight 007, which was shot down by the Soviet Union on September 1, 1983. All 269 people on board were killed, including a sitting U.S. Congressman, Larry McDonald.

The last fatal passenger accident was the Korean Air Flight 801 crash in 1997, which killed 229 people of the 254 people aboard including Shin Ki-ha, a South Korean parliamentarian. The National Transportation Safety Board concluded that poor communication between the flight crew as the probable cause for the air crash, along with the captain's poor decision-making on the non-precision approach.

The last crew fatalities were in the crash of Korean Air Cargo Flight 8509 in 1999 due to instrument malfunction and pilot error.

The last aircraft write-off occurred in 2022, when Korean Air Flight 631 overran the runway at Cebu, Philippines while attempting to land under poor weather conditions.

In a 2023 "landmark decision", the state-affiliated Korea Worker's Compensation and Welfare Service ruled that the cancer death of a flight attendant was akin to an industrial accident. The plaintiff had flown for 25 years on routes to Europe and America, which exposed workers to more cosmic radiation because Earth's magnetic field is weaker over the North Pole. Korean Air said it monitors and limits individual radiation exposure to less than 6mSv a year. The plaintiff's attorney contends that the company uses an old measuring method. The ruling panel said that the method employed by Korean Air could have downplayed the extent of radiation exposure and that the flight attendant could have been exposed to over 100 mSv of radiation.

== See also ==
- List of airlines of South Korea
- List of airports in South Korea
- List of companies of South Korea
- Transport in South Korea
