= SkyTeam Cargo =

Cargo airline alliance

- Launch date: September 2000
- Full members: 7
- Headquarters: Amstelveen, Netherlands
- Management: John Engelaan (vice president Cargo); Teddy Zebitz (chairperson)
- Website: www.skyteam.com/en/cargo/

SkyTeam Cargo is a global cargo airline alliance in which 8 members of the SkyTeam are included (Aeroflot and Aeroflot-Cargo have been suspended from both the passenger and the cargo alliance). SkyTeam Cargo aims to "deliver seamless and sustainable service via technology and aviation". The alliance has 15 cargo hubs, 150 destination countries, and 60 shared warehouses. SkyTeam Cargo is the only type of cargo alliance in the world and is the largest since the WOW Alliance ceased and disbanded in 2010.

== History ==
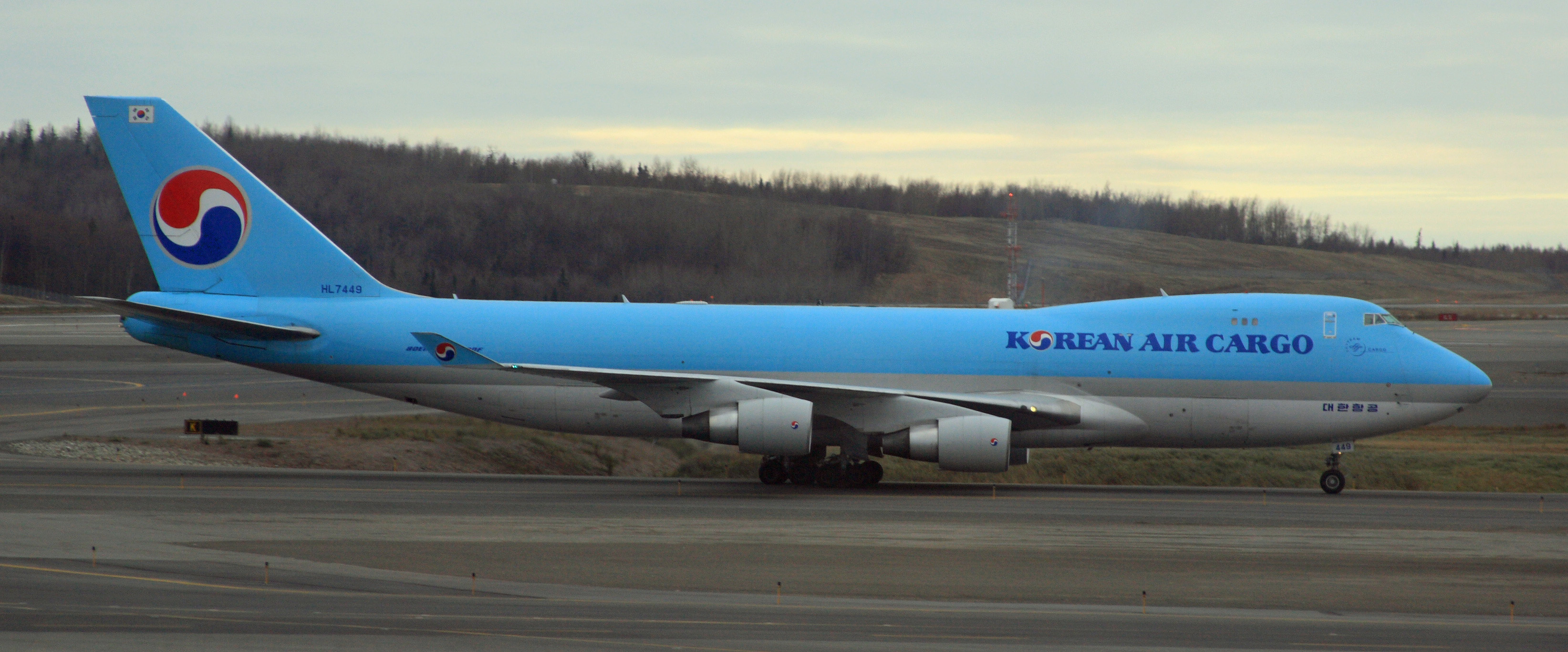
A Boeing 747-400F belonging to Korean Air Cargo, an inaugural SkyTeam Cargo member.

Following the founding of the airline alliance SkyTeam on 22 June 2000, the creation of its cargo division, SkyTeam Cargo, was announced in September that year. The alliance's inaugural members were Aeroméxico Cargo, Air France Cargo, Delta Air Logistics, and Korean Air Cargo, whose passenger airline operations are members of SkyTeam.

In 2001, Czech Airlines Cargo and Alitalia Cargo joined in April and August, respectively. Both divisions joined the cargo alliance within days of CSA Czech Airlines (25 March) and Alitalia (27 July) joining SkyTeam.

KLM Cargo joined SkyTeam Cargo in September 2004, four months after the merger of Air France and KLM, which subsequently created the Air France-KLM holding company. The following year, in September, Northwest Airlines Cargo joined the cargo alliance, a move which came one year after Northwest Airlines joined SkyTeam. However, on 14 April 2008, Northwest merged with Delta Air Lines, which led to the largest airline in the world. China Southern Airlines joined the cargo alliance by November 2010. By November 2013, Aerolíneas Argentinas, one of the leading South American carriers, joined the SkyTeam Cargo Alliance adding more than 30 Latin American destinations to the global network.

== Current members ==
As of May 2025, SkyTeam Cargo has 7 active member airlines; some do not operate dedicated cargo aircraft, they offer space in the baggage compartments of their passenger aircraft only.

| Member airline | Joined | Division airline |
|---|---|---|
| (Argentina) Aerolíneas Argentinas Cargo | 6 November 2013 | Aerolíneas Argentinas |
| (Mexico) Aeroméxico Cargo | September 2000 | Aeroméxico |
| (Netherlands) Air France–KLM Cargo | September 2000 (Air France Cargo); September 2004 (KLM Cargo) | Air France–KLM |
| China Cargo Airlines | 5 June 2013 | China Eastern Airlines |
| (United States) Delta Cargo | September 2000 | Delta Air Lines |
| (South Korea) Korean Air Cargo | September 2000 | Korean Air |
| (Saudi Arabia) Saudia Cargo | 15 April 2019 | Saudia |

== Suspended members ==
As of May 2025, the following cargo airline that was suspended from SkyTeam Cargo:

| Member airline | Joined | Suspended | Parent airline |
|---|---|---|---|
| (Russia) Aeroflot-Cargo | May 2011 | 27 April 2022 | Aeroflot |

== Former members ==
As of May 2025, the following cargo airlines that left SkyTeam Cargo:

| Member airline | Joined | Exited | Parent airline |
|---|---|---|---|
| (Italy) Alitalia Cargo | August 2011 | October 2021 | Alitalia |
| China Southern Airlines Cargo | October 2010 | January 2019 | China Southern Airlines |
| (Czech Republic) Czech Airlines Cargo | April 2011 | October 2024 | Czech Airlines |
| (Italy) ITA Airways Cargo | November 2021 | April 2025 | ITA Airways |
| (United States) Northwest Airlines Cargo | September 2005 | December 2009 | Northwest Airlines |
