= List of Russian rail accidents =

This is a list of Russian rail accidents.

== Russian Empire ==
Accident	Date	Location	Killed	Injured	Type	Description
	12 August 1840	Shushary, Saint Petersburg	6	78	Collision	Two trains collided on Tsarskoye Selo Railway.
	4 September 1851	near Klin	4		Collision	Two trains collided near Klin.
Tiligul disaster	24 December 1875	near Odesa	~140	~120	Derailment	A train was derailed.
1879 Imperial train bombing	19 November 1879	Moscow	0	0	Terrorist incident	An imperial train carrying Alexander II of Russia derailed after a bomb was exploded.
Tcherny railway accident	13 July 1882	Tcherny, Tula Oblast	42	35	Derailment	A train was derailed near Tcherny during heavy rain.
Borki train disaster	29 October 1888	Near Borki station, Kharkov Governorate	21	68	Derailment	An imperial train carrying Alexander III of Russia derailed. Alexander III of Russia was not injured
Valga train disaster	1 May 1897	Valga	58	~100	Derailment	A military train was derailed. The cause of the crash was the erosion of the embankment by heavy rain and too high speed
	1 August 1905	Zima station (Irkutsk Oblast)	20+	80	Derailment	Military train was derailed.
	16 December 1916	Between Saint Petersburg and Petrozavodsk	4	6	Derailment	A train was derailed due to the overspeed.
	13 January 1917	near Petrozavodsk	3	29	Derailment	Train carrying Austrian prisoners of war derailed.

== Soviet Union ==
Accident	Date	Location	Killed	Injured	Type	Description
	October 1920	Pogranichny, Primorsky Krai	~100	Several	Derailment	At Pogranichny, Primorsky Krai, the mail train from Vladivostok to Harbin, China wrecks killing about 100.
Aerowagon crash	24 July 1921	near Serpukhov	7	15	Derailment	An experimental high-speed railcar derailed. Its inventor Valerian Abakovsky was among the victims of the disaster
	8 September 1923	Omsk	82	150	Derailment	An express train derails at Omsk killing 82 and injuring 150.
	October 1924				Fire	On the line from Moscow to Ivanovo and Vasenensk, a mixed train carrying passengers and gasoline is destroyed by fire. It was said that of 200 people on board only 27 survived, but the Soviet authorities suppressed the story.
	30 March 1925	Moscow	10	92	Collision	Two passenger trains collided near Sokolniki station.
	5 February 1926	Moscow	5	22	Derailment	The train failed to slow down and crashed into the platform of the Leningradsky railway station.
	23 September 1929	Zuyevka	30+		Derailment	A train from Moscow to Siberia derails at Zuyevka, between Kursk and Kharkiv (now in Ukraine); at least 30 were killed.
	16 April 1930	Domodedovo	45	23+	Fire	Denatured alcohol spilled and was ignited inside a train. The fire results in the deaths of 45 people and seriously injures 23.
	20 May 1930	Chernaya	28	29	Collision	At Chernaya on the Moscow-Kazan line, the collision of a passenger and a freight train results in the deaths of 28 and severely injures 29.
	29 June 1930		22	28	Derailment	A train from Irkutsk to Leningrad (now St. Petersburg) is derailed near its destination due to a signalman's error; 22 die and 28 are seriously injured.
Pererva train disaster	8 September 1930	Moscow	16	48	Collision	Two passenger trains collided near Pererva station.
	September 1931				Explosion	A troop train southwest of Leningrad explodes with heavy loss of life.
	2 January 1932	Moscow	68	130	Collision	At Kosino, just outside Moscow, a train moving at 40 mph (64 km/h) hits the rear of a stopped suburban train. Although there is time, nobody acts to protect the wreckage and a train of empty freight wagons crashes into it. Altogether 68 people are killed and 130 injured, and 11 railwaymen are arrested for criminal negligence.
	16 October 1932	Moscow	36	51	Collision	The Black Sea express train, coming from Sochi, struck a freight car that had been mistakenly switched to the express tracks at Lublinov station, eleven kilometers from Moscow, telescoping five cars, three of them passenger coaches.
	4 March 1934	Moscow	19	52	Collision	A stationary train is struck by another one, killing 19 and injuring 52. The enginemen of the second train are sentenced to death and three other railwaymen to prison.
	12 March 1934	Tavatuy, Sverdlovsk Oblast	33	68	Collision	A passenger train runs past signals and crashes into a freight train
	6 January 1935	Porbelo	23	56	Collision	At Porbelo on the railway from Leningrad to Moscow, an express from Leningrad to Tiflis (now Tbilisi, Georgia) is stopped by a broken rail. The following train, an express to Moscow, runs past signals and crashes into it.
	22 June 1936	Karymskoye	51	52	Collision	At Karymskoye, a train is allowed to move while the track ahead is occupied. The rear-end collision kills 51 people and injures 52; the stationmaster is sentenced to death and eight other people to prison.
Vereshchyovka train disaster	24 January 1944	Vereshchyovka, Bryansk Oblast	600-700	?	Derailment	A train with soldier and refugees derailed because of bridge collapse.
Circum–Baikal railway disaster	6 March 1946	Irkutsk Oblast	20	29	Collision	Two trains collided in tunnel and caught fire.
Ob Station railway disaster	7 December 1946	Ob, Novosibirsk Oblast	110	133	Collision	A freight train passed a warning signal and crashed into a standing passenger train at high speed.
Drovnino railway disaster	6 August 1952	Drovnino, Moscow Oblast	109	211	Derailment	A passenger train collided with a horse and derailed.
	28 April 1957	Chelyabinsk Oblast	32	14	Level crossing crash	A passenger bus collided with a train at a railway crossing.
	30 June 1958	Leningrad Oblast	30	175	Derailment	Suburban train derailed near Toksovo.
Minino rail disaster	2 June 1959	Krasnoyarsk Krai	65	61	Collision	Two trains collided and caught fire.
	10 May 1962	Moscow	7	32	Collision	Two crowded commuter trains collided on National Railway Day while one of them was stopped at a junction in the north part of Moscow. Foreign newspapermen and diplomats living nearby reported seeing scores of ambulances, but Soviet authorities imposed a cover-up.
Novinka railway disaster	12 June 1965	Leningrad Oblast	5		Collision	Two trains collided and caught fire.
	28 August 1968	Moscow Oblast	~76		Collision	Two trains collided near Domodedovo.
	26 July 1972	Tyumen Oblast	58	16	Collision	Two trains collided near Lamenskaya station.
Kupavna railway disaster	5 September 1975	Moscow Oblast	18	35	Collision	A suburban train collided with a freight train near Noginsk.
	16 February 1976	Jugla	46	61	Collision	Three trains collided in Latvian SSR.
Kryzhovka railway disaster	2 May 1977	Minsk Oblast	19-22	82	Collision	A passenger train crashed into a suburban one standing at the platform.
	27 February 1977	near Leningrad	17		Fire	Younost' train between Moscow and Leningrad caught fire.
	6 December 1978	Kurovskoye	2	0	Explosion	The watchman, for unspecified reasons, shot at the car, which contained explosives that exploded.
Oka railway disaster	13 September 1980	Moscow Oblast	30	58	Collision	Two trains collided near Serpukhov.
Kamensk-Shakhtinsky rail disaster	7 August 1987	Kamensk-Shakhtinsky	107	114	Collision	A freight train collided with standing passenger train.
Arzamas train disaster	4 June 1988	Arzamas, Gorky Oblast	91	1500	Explosion	Three goods wagons carrying a total of 118 tons of hexogen (RDX) exploded on a railway crossing
	16 August 1988	Bologoye	31	100+	Derailment	Express train Avrora was derailed and caught fire.
Ufa train disaster	4 June 1989	near Ufa	575	700	Explosion	Natural gas leaking from a pipeline is ignited by wheel sparks from two trains traveling near the site of the leak; the resulting explosion killed 575 and injured 700 in one of the worst railway accidents in Soviet and Russian history.

== Russian Federation ==
Accident	Date	Location	Killed	Injured	Type	Description
Podsosenka train disaster	3 March 1992	Nelidovo, Tver Oblast	43	108	Collision	A passenger train inbound from Riga to Moscow failed to stop at a red signal and collided with an oncoming freight train at Podsosenka station near Nelidovo, Tver Oblast; the collision started a fire which spread to the passenger cars.
	26 September 1996	Rostov Oblast	22	18	Level crossing crash	A collision between a diesel locomotive and a school bus between Bataysk and Salsk in Rostov Oblast. Nineteen are killed, including 18 children. 28 September was declared a national day of mourning.
	8 November 2001	Trans-Siberian Railway	0	0	Derailment	A nuclear waste train from Bulgaria crashes at midnight between Krasnoyarsk and Kemerovo on the Trans-Siberian Railway. Fourteen of the 20 tanker-wagons derail and the line is closed for about 12 hours. One kilometre of track is damaged.
	16 June 2005	Tver Oblast	0	0	Derailment	Between Zubtsov and Aristovo in Tver Oblast, 27 of 60 fuel oil tankers bound from Moscow to Riga derail at a speed of about 70 km/h (43 mph), about 300 tonnes of fuel leaks. 641 metres (2,103 ft) of track are destroyed and the Volga River was contaminated briefly. The crash was blamed on poor track maintenance.
	12 January 2006	Krasnodar	22	6	Level crossing crash	A collision between a bus and a train at an unpatrolled railway level crossing in Krasnodar killed 22 people and badly injured another 6. All the victims were workers at a factory on their way home aboard the bus, which was almost unrecognisable after the crash. The train's engine car derailed but no-one on the train was hurt.
	18 September 2006	Voronezh Oblast	0	0	Collision	A collision between stations Ikorets and Bityug (Voronezh Oblast), between freight train 3040 moving backward without control with train 2104, stopped at red signal behind. 43 freight cars fully damaged. No one was hurt.
	7 July 2013	Krasnodar Krai	0	75	Derailment	At least 75 are injured when a train from Novosibirsk to Sochi derails between Krylovskaya and Kislyakovka in Krasnodar Krai.
Naro-Fominsk rail crash	20 May 2014	Naro-Fominsk	6	51	Collision	Moldovan Railways passenger train crashed into a Ukrainian Railways freight train that had derailed.
2014 Moscow Metro derailment	15 July 2014	Moscow	24	160	Derailment	An outbound train derailed due to a weathered track, killing 24, and injuring 160, while travelling between Park Pobedy and Slavyansky Bulvar stations of the Arbatsko-Pokrovskaya Line.
	8 August 2015	Mordovia	0	5	Derailment	Four railcars of Passenger train number 233 en route from Yekaterinburg to Adler, Krasnodar Krai run off the rails in Mordovia. Five passengers are injured.
	8 April 2017	Moscow	0	50	Collision	Two passenger trains collide in Moscow, injuring about 50 people.
	6 October 2017	Vladimir Oblast	16	5	Level crossing crash	A train hits a bus carrying Uzbekistani passengers in Vladimir Oblast and kills 16 people.
	20 February 2021	Amur Oblast	0	0	Derailment	In Skovorodinsky, Amur Oblast, 25 cars of a coal train derail on the Trans-Baikal Railway. There were no injuries.
	22 November 2023	Ulyanovsk Oblast	0	25	Collision	Two trains collided.
	26 June 2024	Komi	3	~50	Derailment	A passenger train derailed during heavy rainfall.
	15 July 2024	Belgorod Oblast	1	0	Collision	Two trains collided.
2024 Russia train-truck collision	29 July 2024	Volgograd Oblast	1	52	Level crossing crash	A passenger train collided with a truck. 9 cars derailed, 7 of them overturned. The driver of the truck later died in hospital.
	18 December 2024	Murmansk Oblast	2	27	Collision	Two trains collided.
2025 Russia bridge collapses	31 May 2025	Bryansk Oblast	7	119	Bridge collapse	One of the bridges was destroyed near the village of Vygonichi, as a passenger train traveling on the Klimov–Moscow route was approaching the bridge. The train crashed into the debris of the fallen structure and derailed.
2025 Russia bridge collapses	1 June 2025	Kursk Oblast	0	3	Bridge collapse	A railroad bridge in Zheleznogorsky District over which a 2TE10MK-0680 diesel locomotive with several freight cars was traveling, collapsed down onto a highway. The train caught fire.
	4 August 2025	Leningrad Oblast	1	16	Level crossing crash	A freight train collided with a tourist bus.
	14 September 2025	Leningrad Oblast	1	0	Under investigation	15 freight train cars derailed in Luzhsky District. A few hours later, a diesel locomotive derailed in the Gatchina district.
	20 September 2025	Amur Oblast	2	12	Derailment	A train derailed during repair work.
	3 April 2026	Ulyanovsk Oblast	0	60	Derailment	A passenger train derailed.

== See also ==
- Lists of rail accidents
- List of rail accidents by country

== Bibliography ==
- Semmens, Peter (1994). Railway Disasters of the World: Principal Passenger Train Accidents of the 20th Century. Patrick Stephens Ltd. ISBN 1-85260-323-2.
