= Ufa train disaster =

1989 railway accident in Iglinksy District, Bashkir SSR, Soviet Union

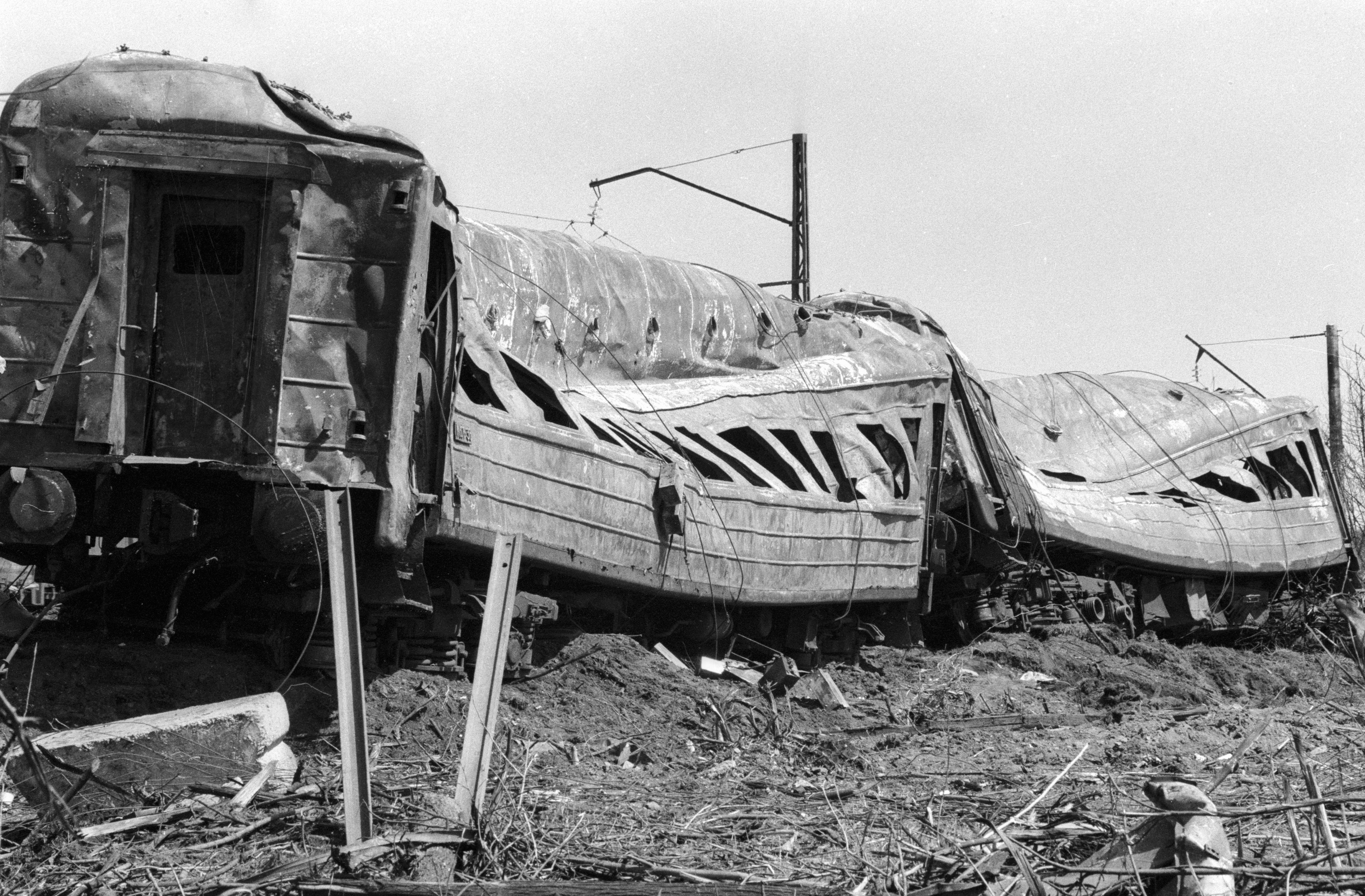
- Destroyed passenger cars after the gas explosion near Ulu-Telyak

Details
- Date: June 4, 1989; 37 years ago 1:15
- Location: Iglinsky District, Bashkir ASSR, Russian SFSR, USSR
- Country: Soviet Union
- Line: Kuybyshev Railway
- Cause: Gas pipeline leak resulting in catastrophic explosion.

Statistics
- Trains: 2
- Passengers: 1,300
- Deaths: 575
- Injured: 725
- Damage: 2 trains

The Ufa train disaster was a railway accident that occurred in the Iglinsky District of the Bashkir ASSR, Soviet Union on 4 June 1989, killing 575 people and injuring 800 more. It is the second-deadliest rail disaster in Soviet/Russian history after the 1944 Vereshchyovka train disaster, and the deadliest to occur during peacetime.

An undetected gas leak from a damaged natural gas liquid pipeline and unique weather conditions caused a build-up of flammable gases in Iglinsky District and the surrounding area. Two passenger trains travelling on the Kuybyshev Railway triggered a gas explosion when sparks from overhead lines ignited a pocket of gas that formed on the railway line. Around one-third of the victims, many of whom were children, were killed by the explosion while the remainder died in hospital from severe burns and brain damage.

The accident was named after Ufa, the largest city in the Bashkir ASSR, although it occurred about 75 kilometres (47 miles) east of the city near Ulu-Telyak. An annual commemoration is usually held at the Ulu-Telyak train station near the disaster site; there is a memorial at the site. It took place exactly a year after the 1988 Arzamas train disaster, another high-casualty train disaster in the Soviet Union.

== Background ==
On 19 January 1981, the Council of Ministers of the Soviet Union approved the construction of a 1,852-kilometre (1,151 mi) pipeline from Western Siberia to the Volga region designed for the transportation of oil, with the first phase to be operational by 1983/1984. The pipeline's route crossed railways in 14 places, including four electrified ones, and for 273 kilometres (170 mi) was within 1 kilometre (0.62 mi) of a railway line including the Trans-Siberian Railway. Shortly before its completion and planned commissioning, the Ministry of Oil Industry decided to convert the pipeline to transport light hydrocarbons similar to liquefied petroleum gas for the Soviet petrochemical industry. The pipeline's conversion occurred despite having a pipe diameter of 720 millimetres, nearly double the Soviet safety regulation of a maximum 400 millimetres for liquefied gas. In May 1984, the Ministry of Oil Industry canceled the installation of an automatic real time leak detection system.

In 1985, an excavator caused severe mechanical damage to the pipeline in the Iglinsky District of the Bashkir ASSR during the construction of a bypass, creating a 1.7 metres (5.6 ft) crack. This led to an undetected gas leak of mainly propane and butane which, due to unusual weather conditions, began to accumulate rather than dissipate. Clouds of highly-flammable gases accumulated into "gas lake" in the lowlands of the surrounding area for several years. One of these areas was located 900 metres (3,000 feet) away along the electrified Kuybyshev Railway near the town of Ulu-Telyak. Additionally, on the night of the explosion, there was increased pressure in the system due to increased demand. Approximately three hours before the incident, a drop in pressure was detected but on-duty personnel did not react with concern nor investigate the cause. Instead, they responded by increasing the supply of gas to restore the normal pressure. This inadvertently (and negligently) increased the amount of flammable gases seeping onto the railway. Train drivers who had passed through the area had reported the noticeable smell of gas to their train dispatchers, but this was also ignored without concern.

== Accident ==
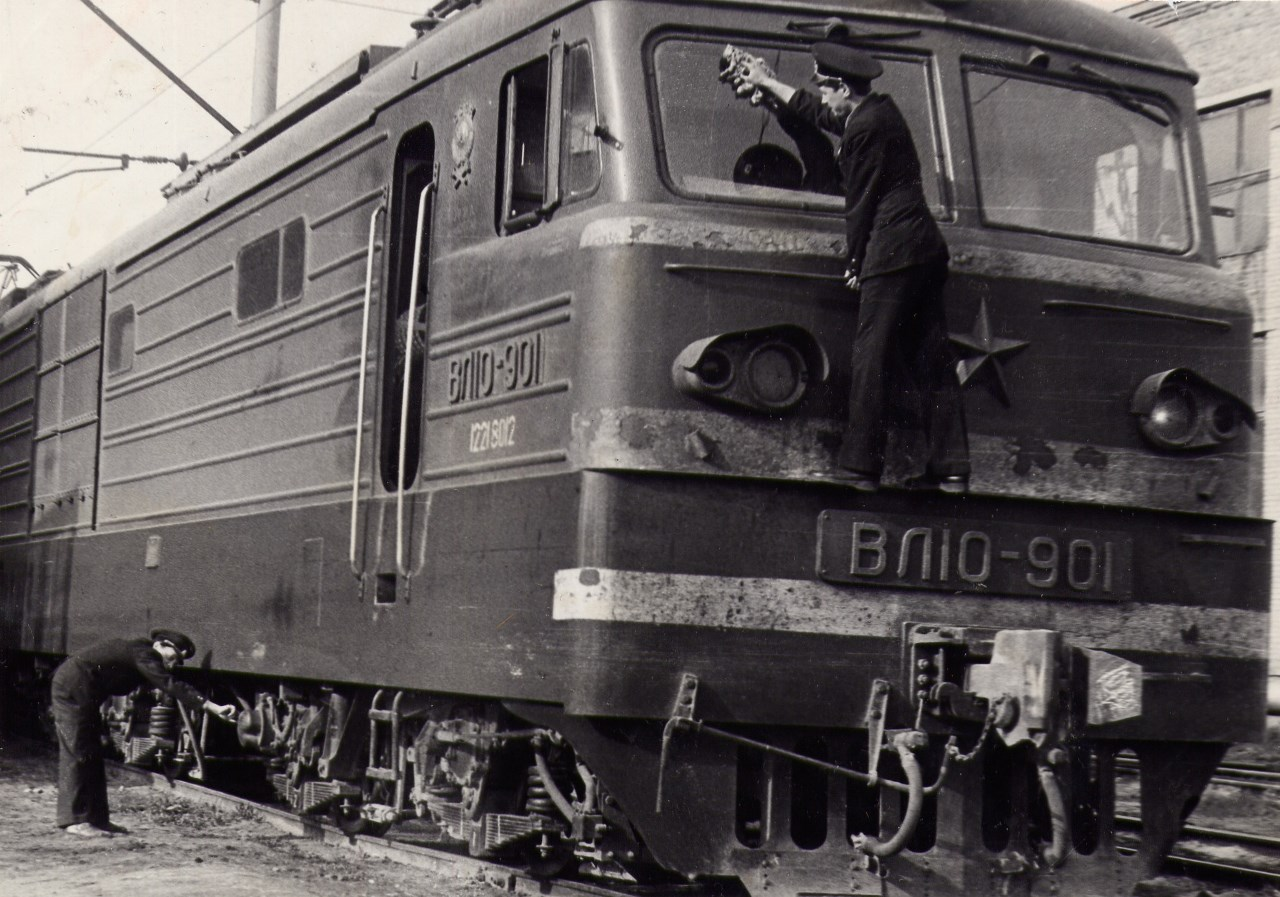
VL10-901, one of the locomotives involved

At 1:15 a.m., two passenger trains of the Kuybyshev Railway carrying approximately 1,300 vacationers to and from Novosibirsk and a resort in Adler on the Black Sea exploded, 11 kilometres (6.8 miles) from the town of Asha, Chelyabinsk Oblast.

The explosion occurred after sparks from the overhead wiring feeding the locomotives of the two passenger trains, or wheel sparks ignited this flammable cloud. Estimates of the size of the explosion have ranged from 250 to 300 tons TNT equivalent to up to 10 kilotons TNT equivalent.

Military units and medical teams were dispatched to the scene of the accident, many of whom searched the surrounding woods and mountains in case victims managed to escape from the scene of the accident. Scenes of the accident were broadcast on Soviet television channels, with images of both the accident and victims being shown. Victims were initially evacuated to nearby towns for basic first aid, before they were evacuated by medical vehicles and helicopters to Ufa and Chelyabinsk or flown via Aeroflot to Moscow for the most severely injured. The total evacuation took 16 hours and 45 minutes with 806 people admitted to hospitals and burn centers.

== Victims ==
Many of the victims died later in hospital; official figures are 575 dead and over 800 injured, but an unofficial estimate of the number of deaths is approximately 780. 181 of the dead were children.

Many survivors received severe thermal burns and brain injuries. Of the reported 469 survivors, 109 were children with a majority of them hospitalized. A 17-member burn team flew from San Antonio, Texas to Ufa to help assist in the care and management of about 150 burn patients. The group returned to Moscow for evaluation and treatment of about 25 children seven months after the disaster, with hepatitis, cardiomyopathy and severe emotional disorders all seen in the children. A 16-person team from the UK went to Chelyabinsk to assist there.

== Investigation ==
On the afternoon of 4 June, Mikhail Gorbachev, Chairman of the Supreme Soviet of the USSR, and members of the government commission to investigate the accident visited the site. Rumors of sabotage were widespread in the local population, but a majority of officials believed the disaster was accidental. The Chairman of the Commission for Investigation of the accident was Deputy Chairman of the Council of Ministers of the USSR Gennady Vedernikov. The trial over the accident continued for six years, nine officials being charged, mostly members of Nefteprovodmontazh (the trust that constructed the faulty pipeline) including the chief of the construction and installation department of Nefteprovodmontazh and foremen. The charges were brought under Article 215, part II of the Criminal Code of the RSFSR, where the maximum penalty was five years imprisonment.

== Aftermath ==
The next day was declared a national day of mourning with flags lowered and entertainment programs cancelled. A planned resumption of the National Congress of People's Deputies was also cancelled. Pink Floyd's A Momentary Lapse of Reason Tour gig was rescheduled for June 8.

== See also ==
- Largest artificial non-nuclear explosions
