= Aeroflot fleet =

Aircraft operated by Russian airline Aeroflot

The Aeroflot fleet consists of narrow-body and wide-body aircraft from the following families: Airbus A320 family, Airbus A330, Airbus A350, Boeing 737, and Boeing 777.

Before the Dissolution of the Soviet Union, Aeroflot's fleet consisted almost entirely of aircraft built by Soviet manufacturers such as Antonov, Ilyushin, and Tupolev.

== Current fleet ==
The Aeroflot fleet, excluding that of subsidiaries, comprises the following aircraft, including 112 Airbus planes and 59 Boeing planes. As a result of international sanctions during the Russian invasion of Ukraine, the company has ordered over 400 Russian-made jets and plans on making the Yakovlev MC-21 its flagship plane, with deliveries expected to start in 2027.

Aeroflot fleet
| Aircraft | In service | Orders | Passengers | | | | Notes |
| Aircraft | In service | Orders | J | W | Y | Total | Notes |
|---|---|---|---|---|---|---|---|
| Airbus A320-200 | 52 | — | 20 | — | 120 | 140 | |
| Airbus A320-200 | 52 | — | 8 | — | 150 | 158 | |
| Airbus A320neo | 6 | — | 12 | — | 144 | 156 | |
| Airbus A321-200 | 32 | — | 28 | — | 142 | 170 | |
| Airbus A321-200 | 32 | — | 16 | — | 167 | 183 | |
| Airbus A321neo | 3 | — | 12 | — | 184 | 196 | |
| Airbus A330-300 | 12 | — | 28 | — | 268 | 296 | |
| Airbus A330-300 | 12 | — | 36 | — | 265 | 301 | |
| Airbus A350-900 | 7 | — (Note: The airline had ordered a total of 22 aircraft, of which 7 planes were delivered and 15 planes were reallocated to other airlines in 2022 and 2023 due to International sanctions during the 2022 Russian invasion of Ukraine.) | 28 | 24 | 264 | 316 | |
| Boeing 737-800 | 37 | — | 20 | — | 138 | 158 | |
| Boeing 777-300ER | 22 | — | 30 | 48 | 324 | 402 | |
| Boeing 777-300ER | 22 | — | 28 | 24 | 375 | 427 | |
| Tupolev Tu-214 | — | 40 | TBA | | | | Ordered in September 2022. |
| Yakovlev MC-21-300 | — | 266 | 16 | — | 159 | 175 | Additional order for 210 of its type in September 2022. |
| Yakovlev SJ-100-95 | — | 89 | 12 | — | 75 | 87 | Additional order for 89 of its type in September 2022. |
| Total | 171 | 395 | | | | | |

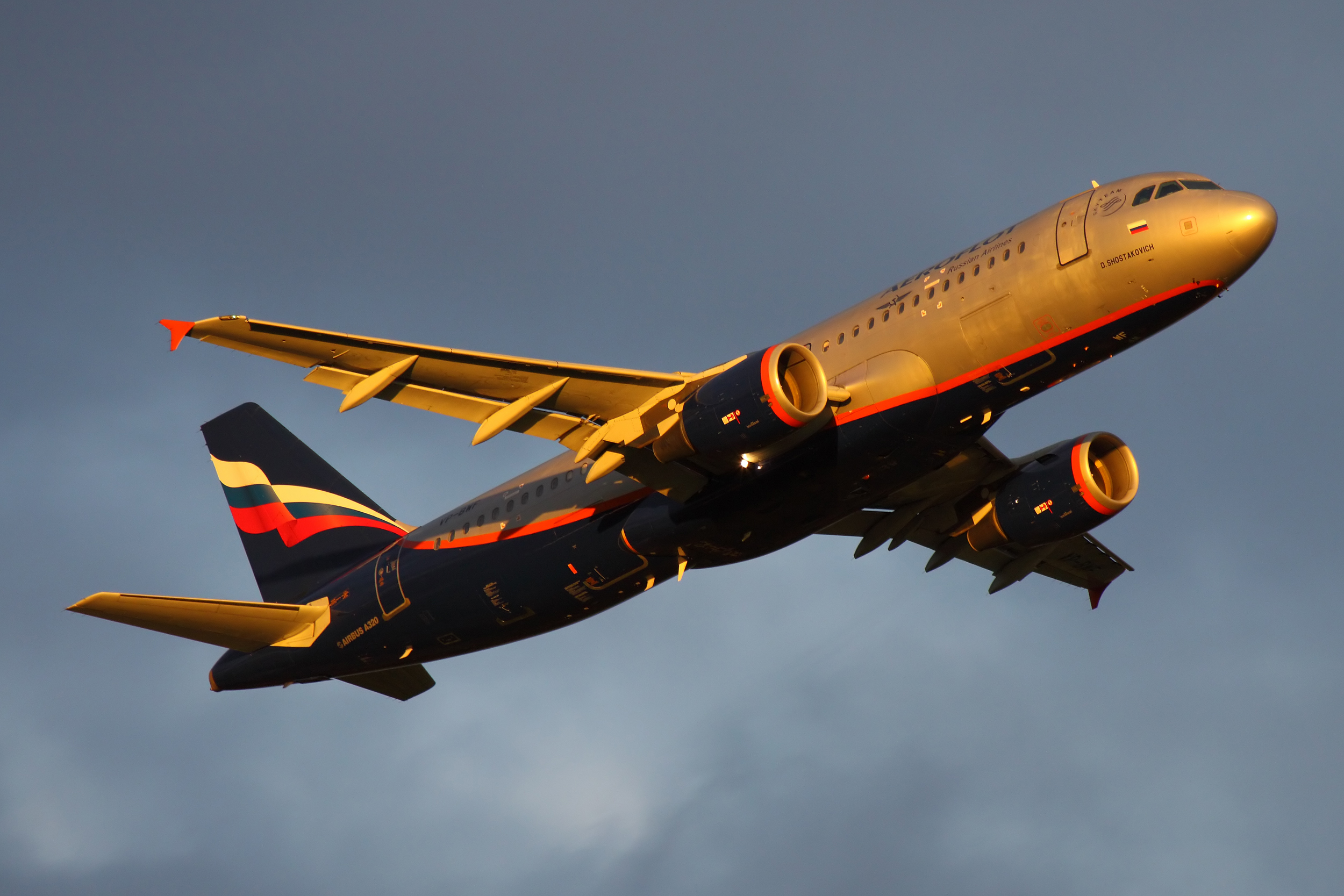
Airbus A320-200

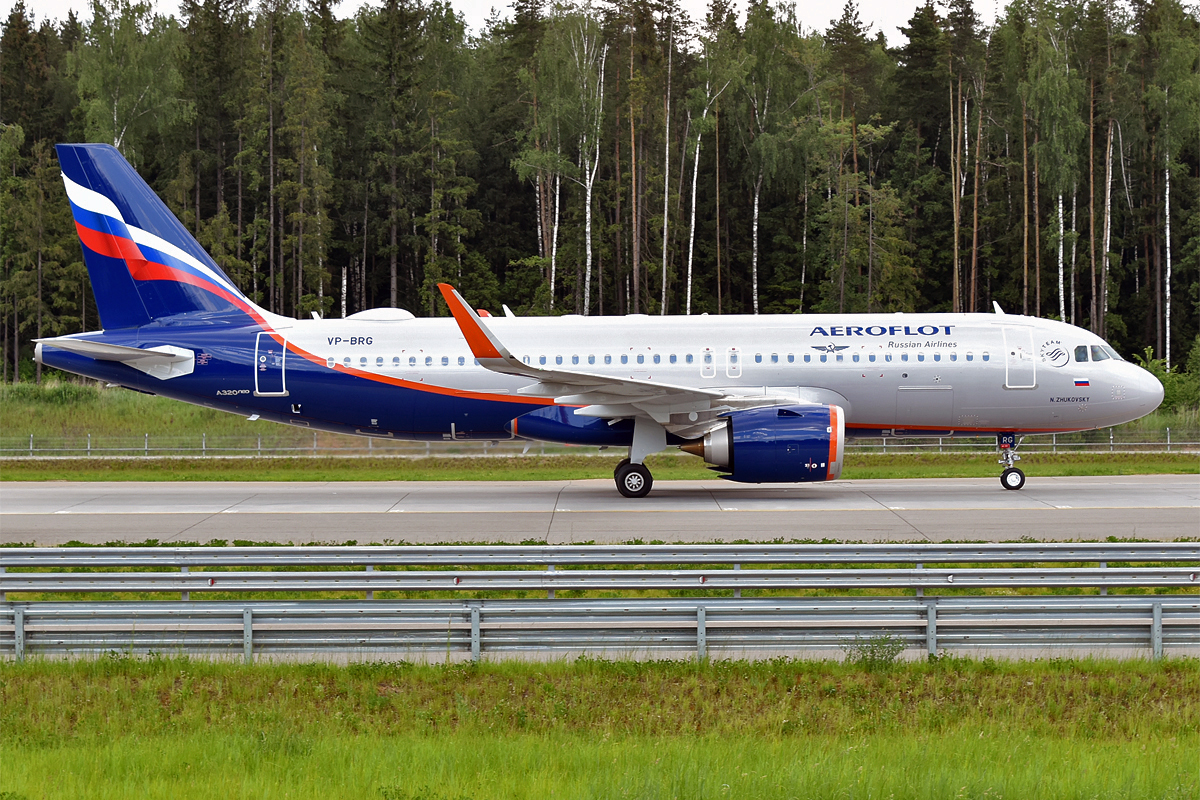
Airbus A320neo

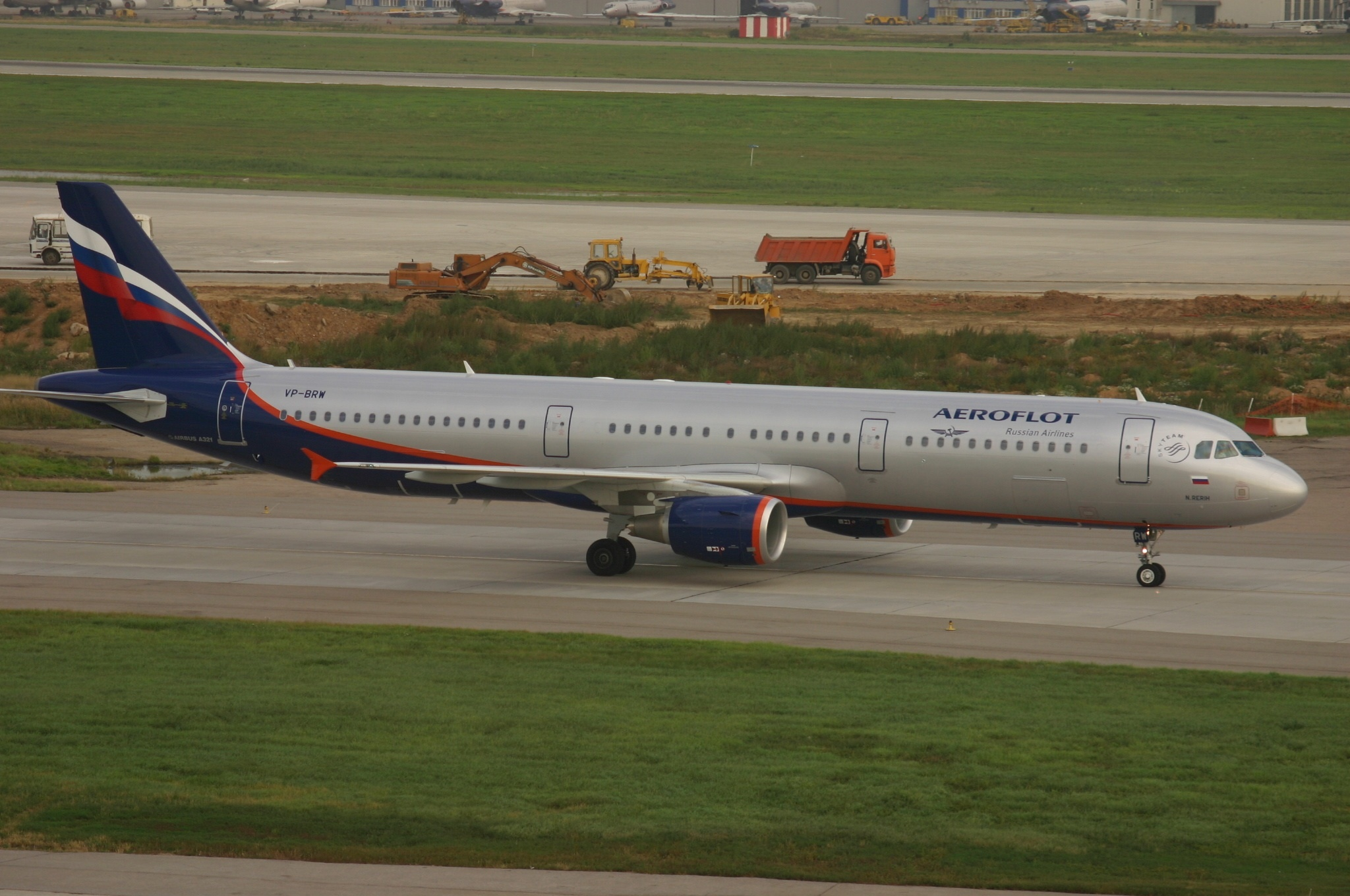
Airbus A321-200

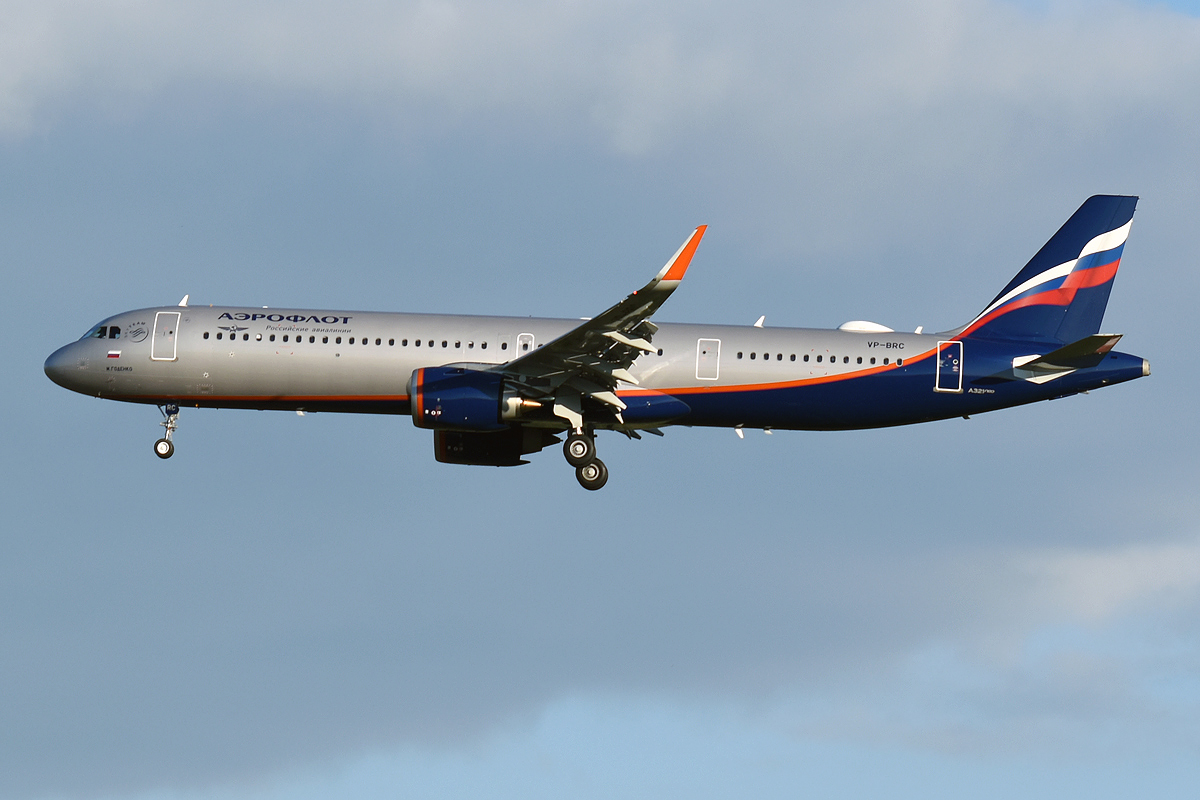
Airbus A321neo

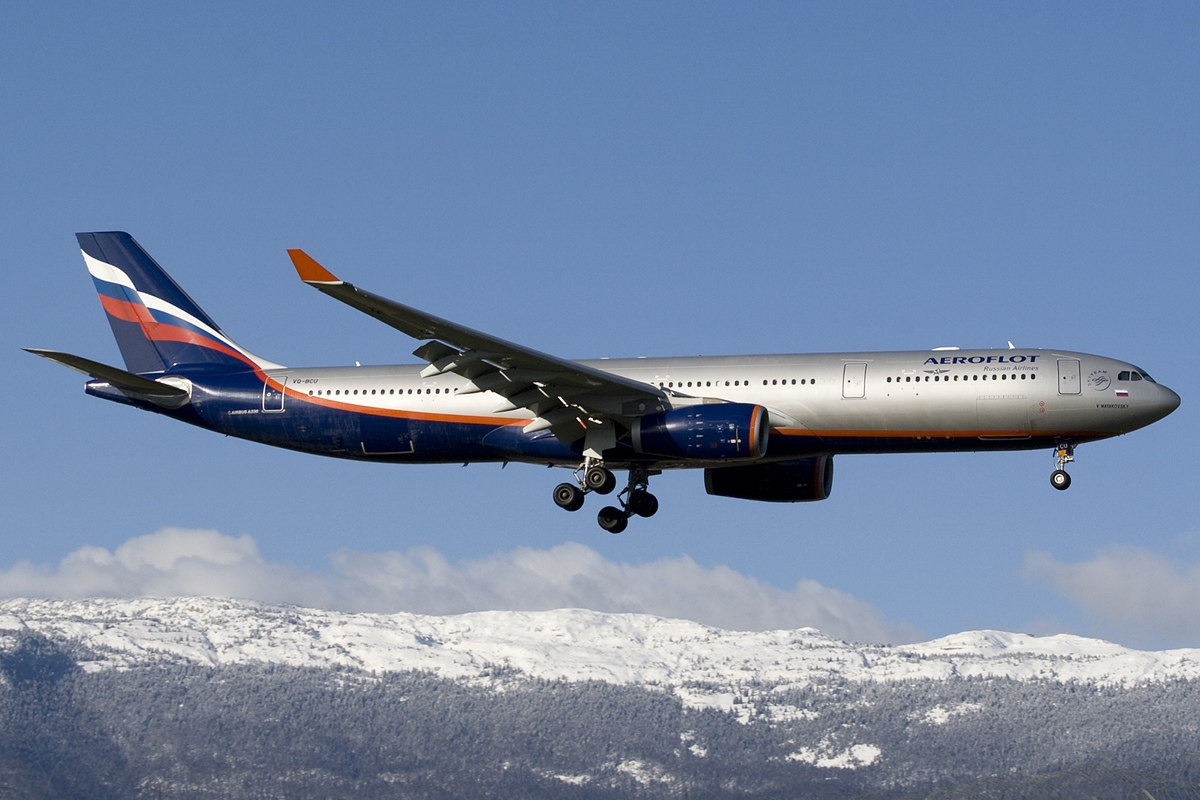
Airbus A330-300

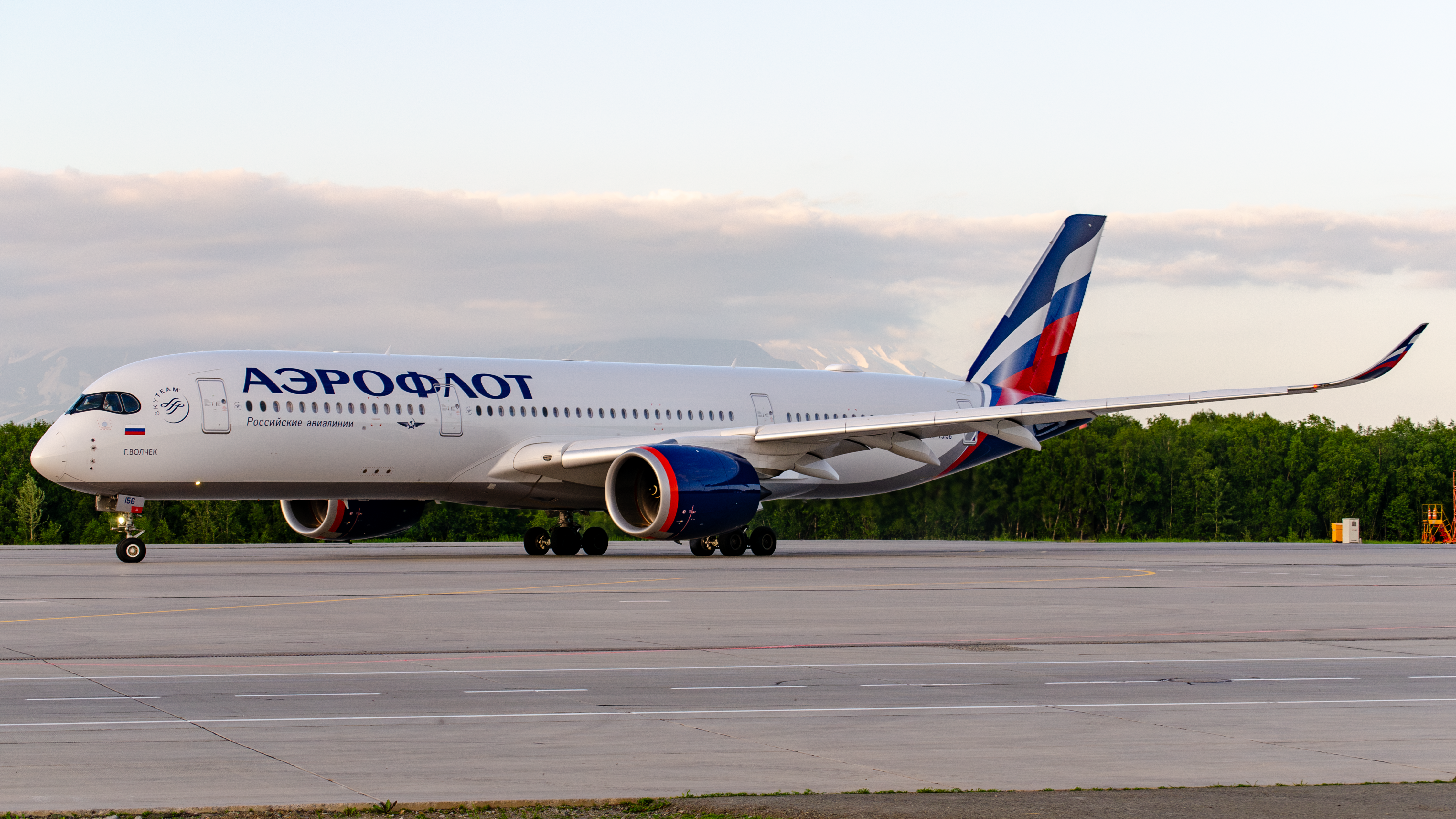
Airbus A350-900

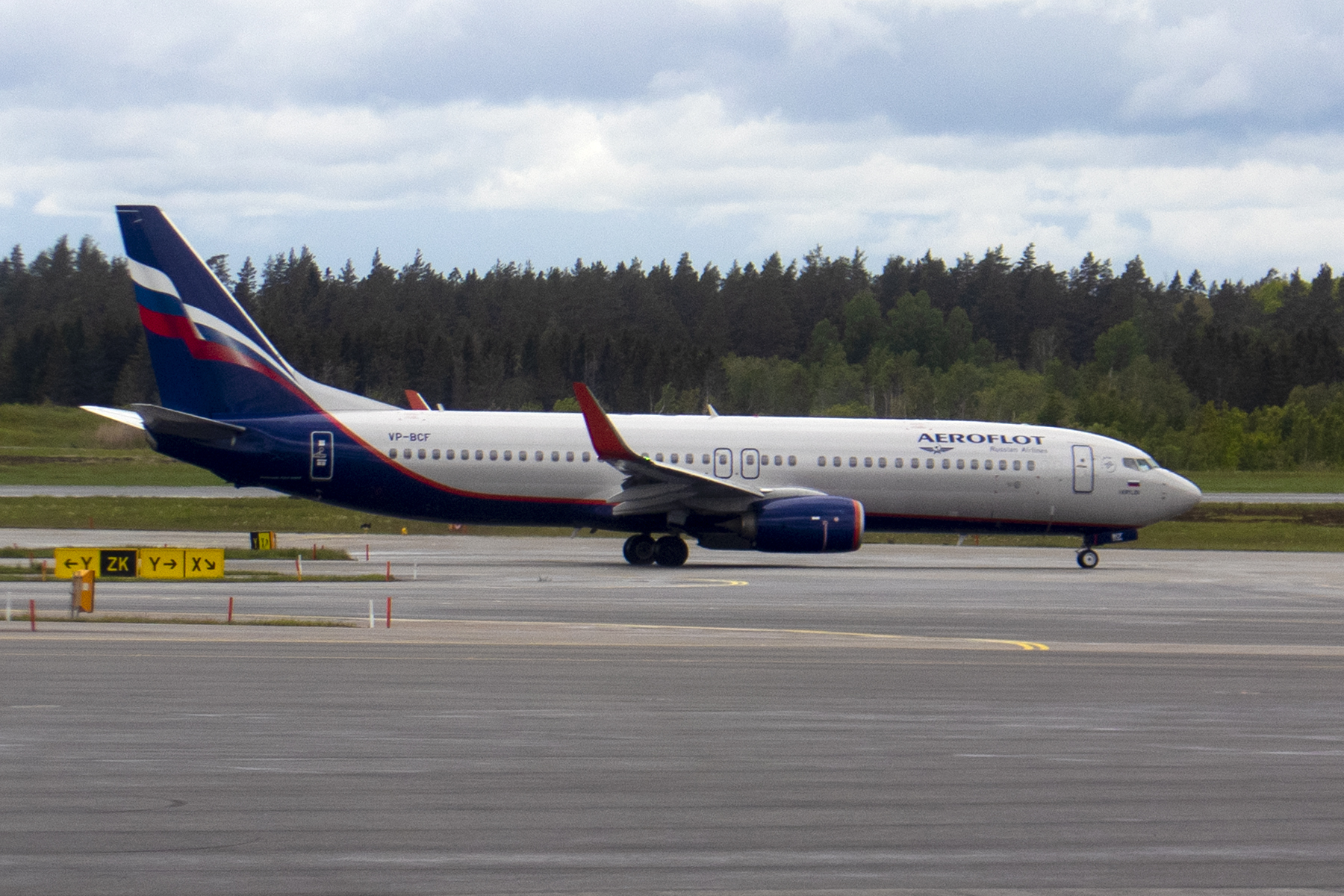
Boeing 737-800

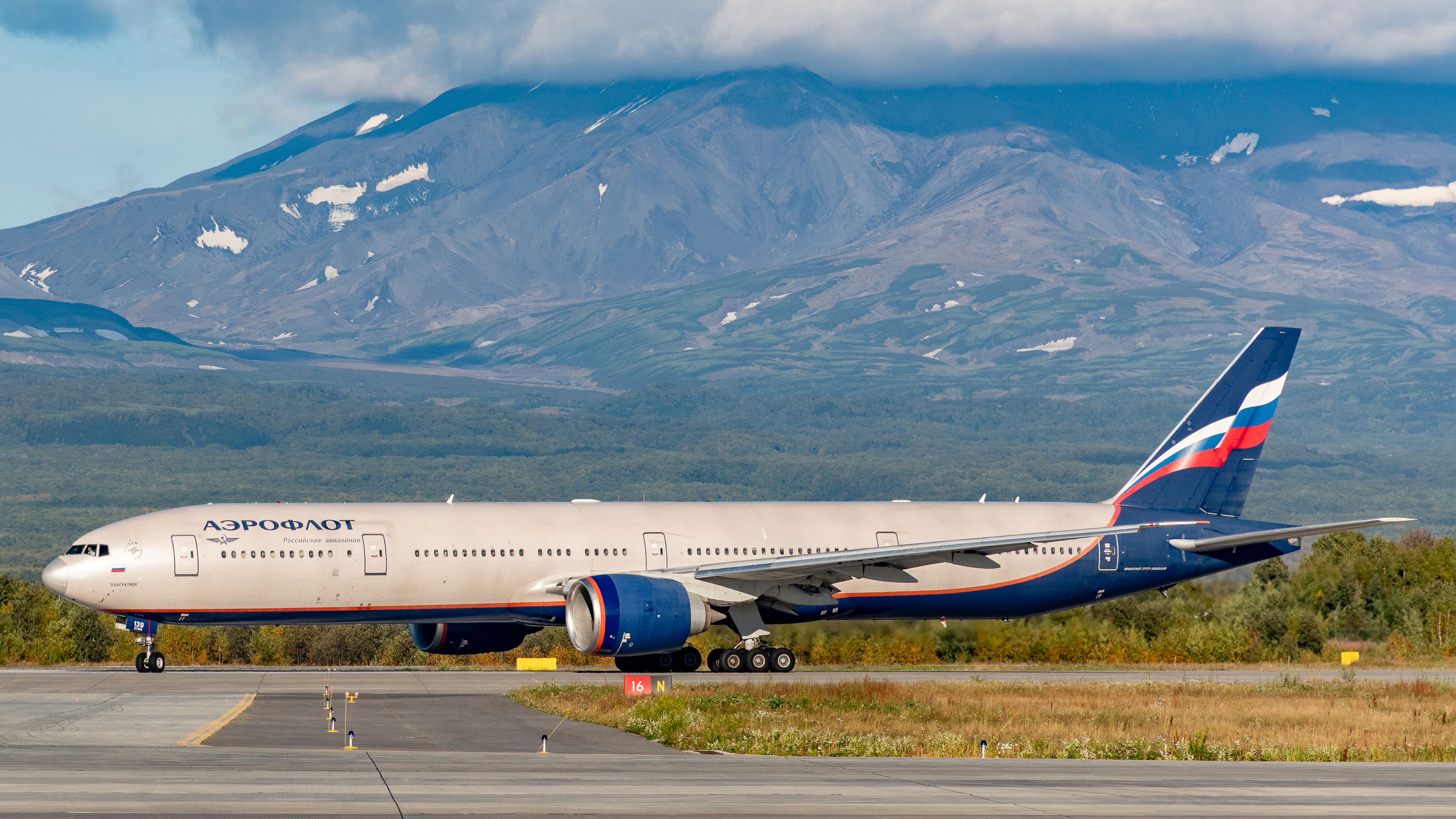
Boeing 777-300ER

== Retired ==
Aeroflot former mainline aircraft since 1954
| Aircraft | Introduced | Retired | Notes |
|---|---|---|---|
| Airbus A310 | 1992 | 2006 | |
| Airbus A319-100 | 2003 | 2016 | |
| Airbus A330-200 | Unknown | Unknown | |
| Antonov An-2 | 1948 | Unknown | |
| Antonov An-10 | 1959 | 1973 | |
| Antonov An-24 | 1962 | Unknown | |
| Antonov An-124 | 1980 | 2000 | Cargo aircraft. |
| Boeing 737-300SF | 2008 | 2009 | Cargo aircraft. |
| Boeing 737-400 | 1998 | 2004 | |
| Boeing 767-300ER | 1994 | 2015 | |
| Boeing 767-300ERF | 1994 | 2014 | Cargo aircraft. |
| Boeing 777-200ER | 1998 | 2005 | |
| Ilyushin Il-12 | 1947 | 1970 | |
| Ilyushin Il-14 | 1954 | Unknown | |
| Ilyushin Il-18 | 1958 | Unknown | |
| Ilyushin Il-62 | 1967 | 2002 | |
| Ilyushin Il-76 | 1979 | 2004 | Cargo aircraft. |
| Ilyushin Il-86 | 1980 | 2006 | |
| Ilyushin Il-96-300 | 1993 | 2014 | |
| McDonnell Douglas DC-10F | 1995 | 2009 | Cargo aircraft. |
| McDonnell Douglas MD-11F | 2008 | 2013 | Cargo aircraft. |
| Sukhoi Superjet 100 | 2011 | 2023 | Transferred to subsidiary Rossiya Airlines. |
| Tupolev Tu-104 | 1956 | 1979 | |
| Tupolev Tu-114 | 1961 | 1976 | |
| Tupolev Tu-124 | 1962 | 1980 | |
| Tupolev Tu-134 | 1967 | 2007 | |
| Tupolev Tu-144 | 1977 | 1978 | |
| Tupolev Tu-154 | 1968 | 2009 | |
| Tupolev Tu-204 | 1990 | 2005 | |
| Yakovlev Yak-40 | 1966 | 1995 | |
| Yakovlev Yak-42 | 1980 | 2000 | |

== History ==
During the Soviet era, almost all Aeroflot's airliners were built by Soviet manufacturers. During the 1940s and the early 1950s, the main aircraft was the Lisunov Li-2, a license-built version of the Douglas DC-3. The first to be produced in the Soviet Union was completed in 1939. DC-3s modified by fitting Soviet-made engines, named the PS-84, were also used later. The Li-2 would be replaced by the Ilyushin Il-12, which entered service in 1947, and the Ilyushin Il-14, which entered service in 1954. Aeroflot also operated thousands of the Antonov An-2 STOL biplane (first flying in 1947), in passenger and cargo roles. The An-2 remained in service until the 1980s.

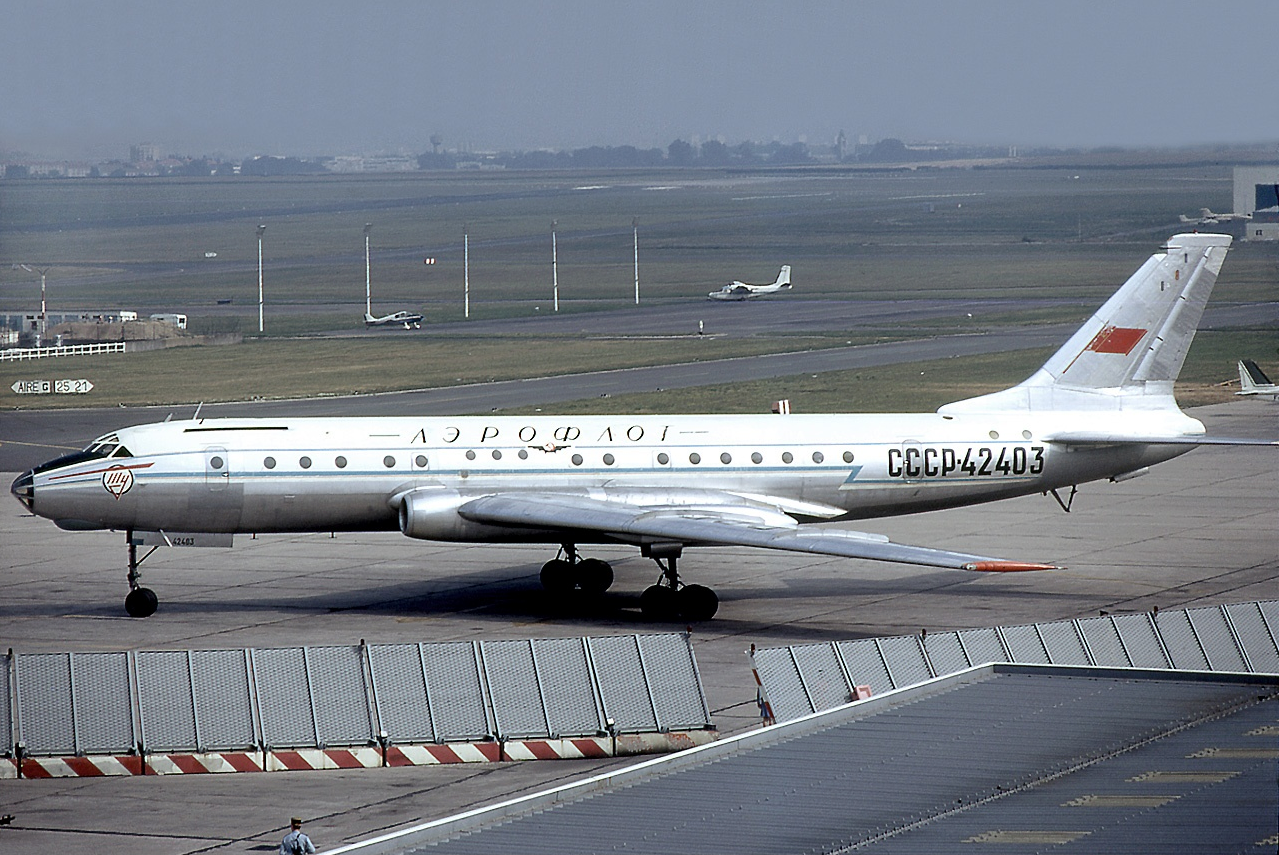
Aeroflot Tupolev Tu-104 at Le Bourget Airport in 1974

Aeroflot began operating the Tupolev Tu-104, reportedly named Silver Arrow, with at least three in service between Moscow and the Russian Far East by June 1956. The Tu-104 was the USSR's first jet airliner. The first two routes on which it was deployed were the Moscow–Irkutsk and the Moscow–Yakutsk runs; in September 1956, the Moscow–Tiflis route became the third scheduled service flown with the aircraft. Likewise, Moscow–Prague was the first international route served with the Silver Arrow.

In 1962, Aeroflot began operating the Tupolev Tu-124, the smaller version of the Tu-104, on regional routes. These were later replaced by the Tupolev Tu-134, which entered service in 1967. The Tupolev Tu-114, originally used to transport Soviet leaders and once the world's largest commercial aircraft, came into service on 24 April 1961 on the Moscow–Khabarovsk route. It also served international routes, such as Moscow to Tokyo in conjunction with Japan Airlines, as well as the Moscow–Havana route, which started on 7 January 1963—the airline's longest non-stop service at that time. The first Ilyushin Il-62 long-range four-engined airliner entered service with Aeroflot in 1967, with an inaugural flight from Moscow to Montreal on 15 September. It was complemented, in 1972, by medium-range Tupolev Tu-154. This jet is the most popular Russian airliner, with more than 1,000 made. The Tu-154M variant was delivered to Aeroflot in 1984.

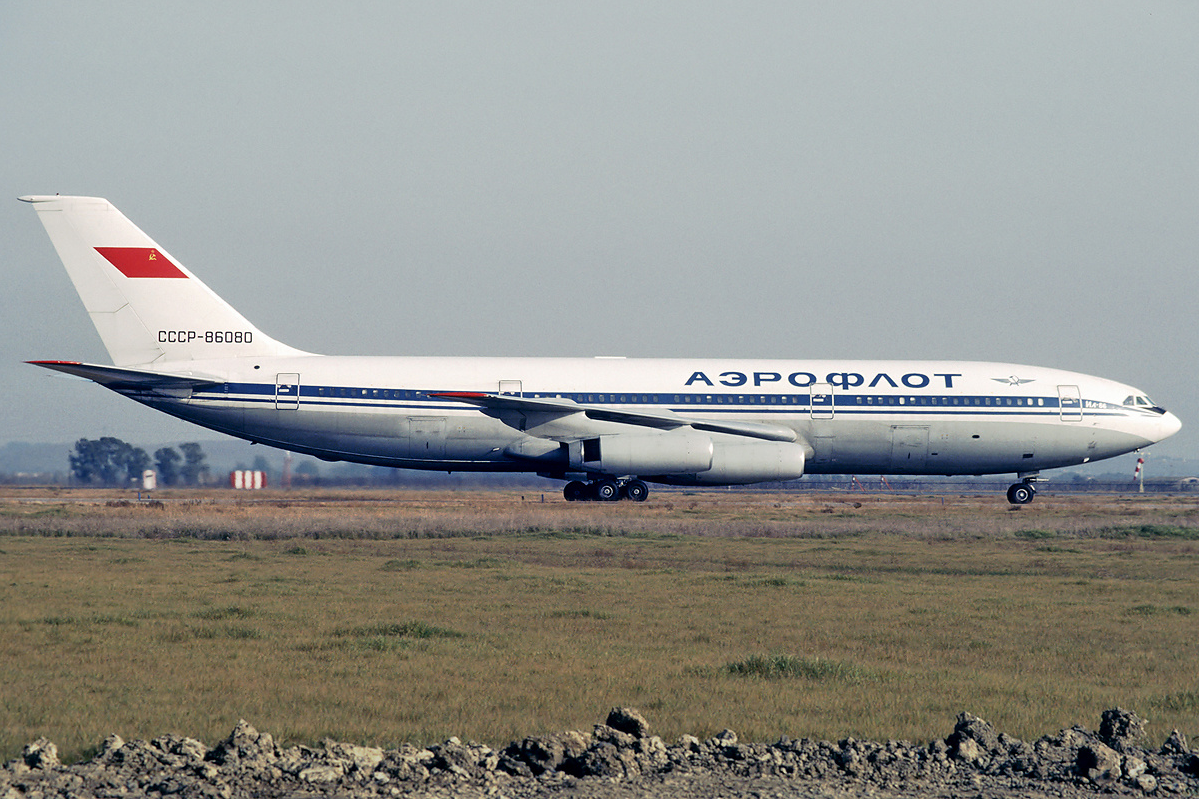
Aeroflot Ilyushin Il-86 at Fiumicino Airport in 1992

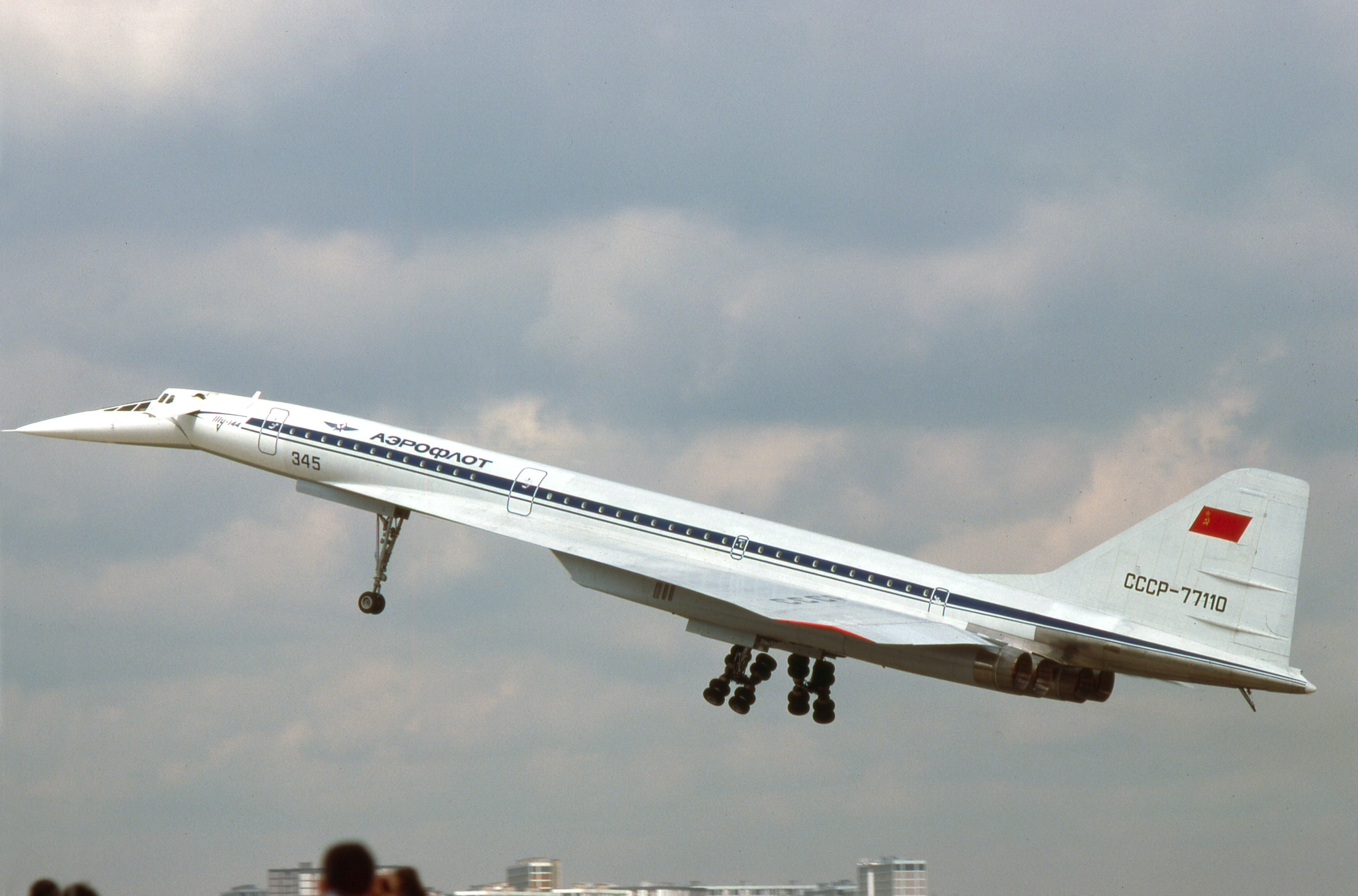
Aeroflot Tupolev Tu-144

The carrier started flying the supersonic Tupolev Tu-144 on freighter services in 1975. On 1 November 1977, the aircraft was deployed on the 1,750-nautical-mile (3,240 km; 2,010 mi) long Moscow-Domodedovo–Alma-Ata route on a regular basis, yet these services were discontinued in May 1978. That month, an aircraft of the type was written off after an emergency landing following an electrical failure, withdrawing political support to the project and putting an end to the production. Despite official versions indicating the indefinite suspension of supersonic flights within the Soviet Union, a re-engined version of the aircraft was put on a test flight between Moscow and Khabarovsk in June 1979, and the 3,750-mile (6,040 km) long route was later covered with scheduled services; it was not a nonstop flight, however, since the aircraft had to make a refuelling stop, as the engines consumed more fuel than expected.

First flown in March 1975, the 120-seater Yakovlev Yak-42 entered service with Aeroflot in 1980. The 350-seater Ilyushin Il-86, the first Russian-made wide-body aircraft, had its maiden flight in December 1976, and entered scheduled services with the carrier on the Moscow-Vnukovo–Tashkent run in 1981. (Note: It was also reported that the aircraft began scheduled services with Aeroflot in December 1980.) The aircraft was phased out by the end of 2006.

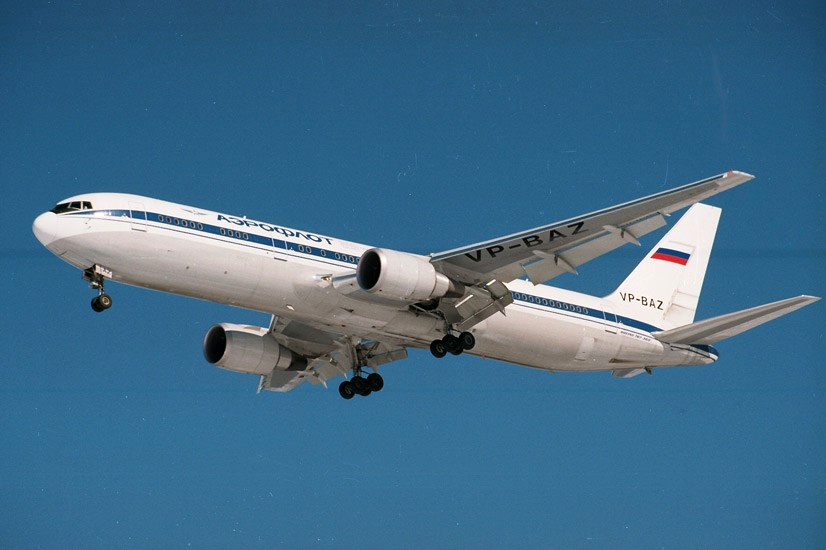
Aeroflot Boeing 767-300ER, 2001

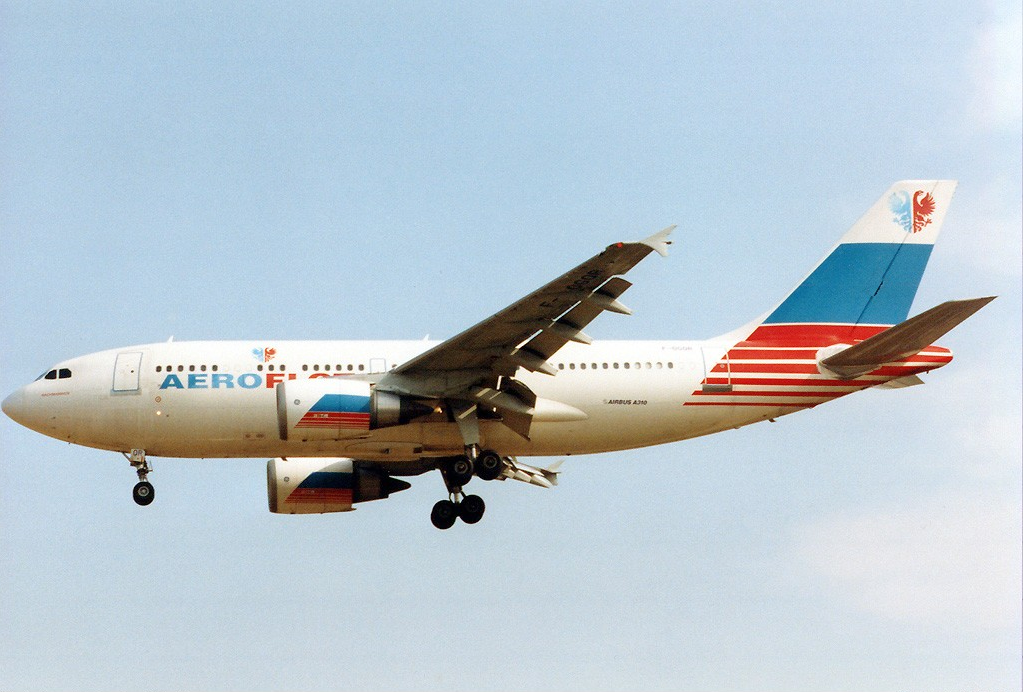
An Airbus A310-300, 1994

The first Western-made aircraft, the Airbus A310, was incorporated into the fleet in 1992. This milestone also made Aeroflot the first Russian customer for Airbus. The first example of the Ilyushin Il-96, which was also the first Soviet fly-by-wire aircraft, had its maiden flight in 1988, and was certificated in December 1992; the first Aeroflot Il-96-300 entered the fleet in 1993, and was initially deployed on the Moscow–New York City route in July that year. Pending approval for an Ex-Im Bank financing package, a contract worth US$1.5 billion for the acquisition of twenty Il-96s, including ten Il-96T cargo aircraft and ten Il-96Ms that were initially slated for delivery between 1996 and 1999, was signed in June 1995. The Ex-Im Bank approved the loan in early 1996. Boeing objected to the deal, but the dispute was later settled following an Aeroflot order for ten Boeing 737-400s —placed in April 1997 in a deal worth US$440 million— that were granted a tax exemption by the Russian government; nevertheless, the financing was blocked again when four Boeing 767-300ERs also ordered by Aeroflot were not included in the accorded exemption. Later on, these four aircraft were also exempted from paying customs taxes. The first of these Boeing 767-300ERs commenced operating in August 1999; the airline had taken delivery of the first Boeing 737-400 in May the same year.

From 1998 to 2005, Aeroflot leased two Boeing 777s, using the type on routes to the USA.

In September 2005, the company suspended direct flights between Moscow and Seattle.

In 2005, Aeroflot ordered 30 Sukhoi Superjet 100 aircraft with 98 seats in one class. Later, the airline decided to upgrade the avionics (FMS and weather radar) and modify the aircraft configuration to have 87 seats in two classes, with extra cabin crew seat, lavatory and galley. To avoid delivery delays, the first 10 SSJ100s were delivered with the original "light" specification; subsequent aircraft were updated ("full").

Matters came to a head in September 2006 as Aeroflot's board of directors convened to vote on the Boeing contract. This coincided with the United States imposing sanctions on various Russian companies (including a major aircraft maker, Sukhoi) for allegedly supplying Iran in violation of the US's Iran Nonproliferation Act of 2000 and with the Russian state-owned Vneshtorgbank buying 5% of the stock in EADS, the corporation behind Airbus. The state's representatives on the board abstained from the vote and another round of lobbying ensued, with Russian news sources reporting Aeroflot's efforts to placate the state by offering to order both 22 Boeing 787 Dreamliner and 22 Airbus A350 XWB aircraft, effectively doubling its long-range fleet. Banker Alexander Lebedev, the man behind National Reserve Corporation, reached a deal with Boeing to prolong the deadline, using his corporation's money.

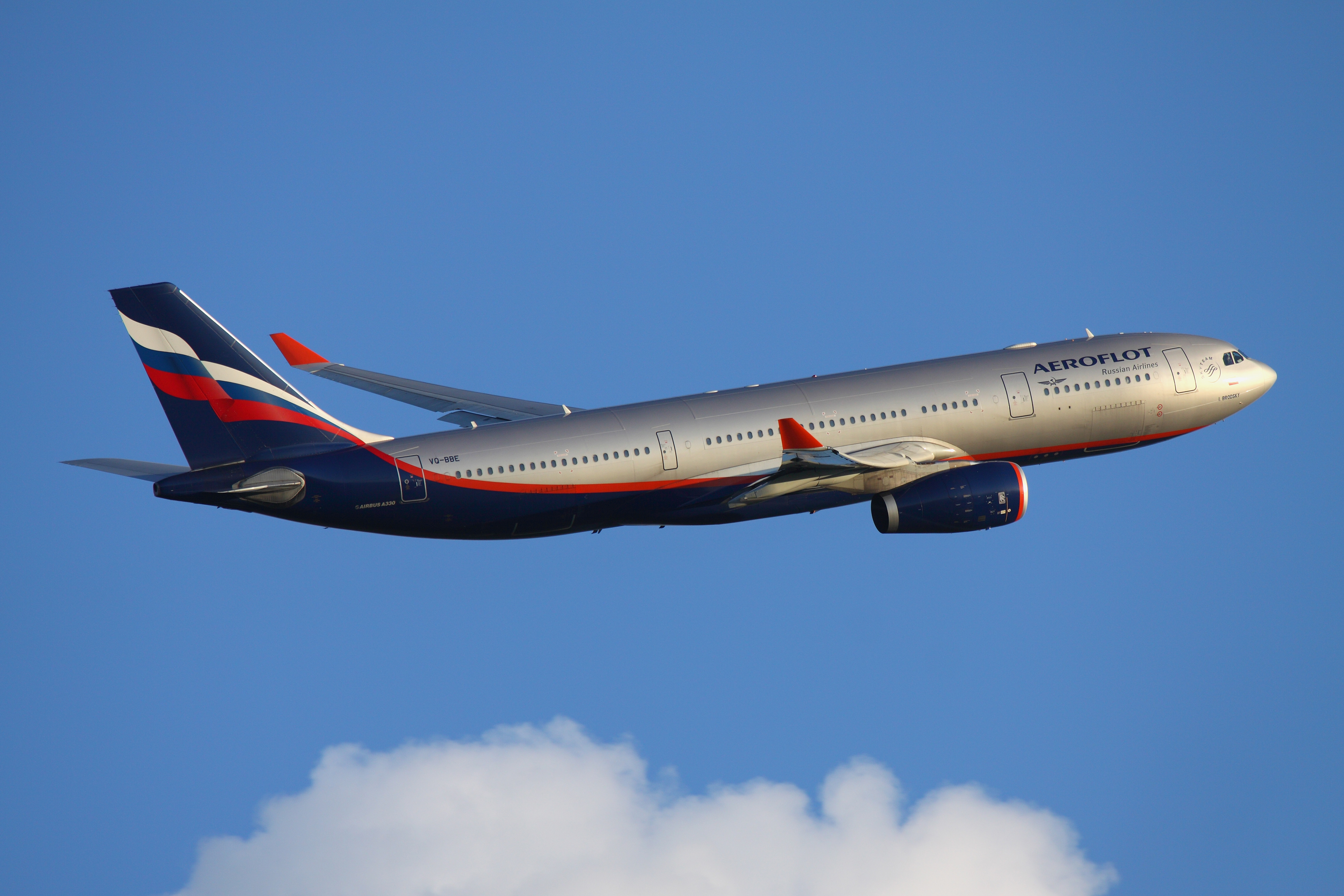
An Airbus A330-200, 2011

In March 2007, Aeroflot signed a memorandum of understanding with Airbus for the acquisition of 22 Airbus A350 XWBs, and 10 Airbus A330-200s. The transaction for the A350 XWBs was formalised late that year in a deal worth US$3.1 billion. The handover of the first A350 XWB was due to take place in 2015. Delivery has been delayed by three years, with the first aircraft to enter the fleet in 2018. A contract for the acquisition of 22 Boeing 787 Dreamliners was signed in June 2007, reportedly consisting of Boeing 787-8s with deliveries starting in 2014; in September the same year, Boeing officially announced that Aeroflot placed an order for these aircraft in a deal worth US$3.6 billion. Five of the Airbus A330 aircraft on order were upgauged to the larger but shorter-range A330-300s, scheduled to arrive on an operating lease starting in late 2008. The first Airbus A330 entered the fleet in late 2008; it was an A330-200 and was initially put into service on the Moscow–St. Petersburg route for testing purposes. Despite the A330s having been initially aimed at providing interim capacity ahead of the arrival of both the Airbus A350s and the Boeing 787s the company had previously ordered, the type has been gradually incorporated into the fleet on a long-term basis.

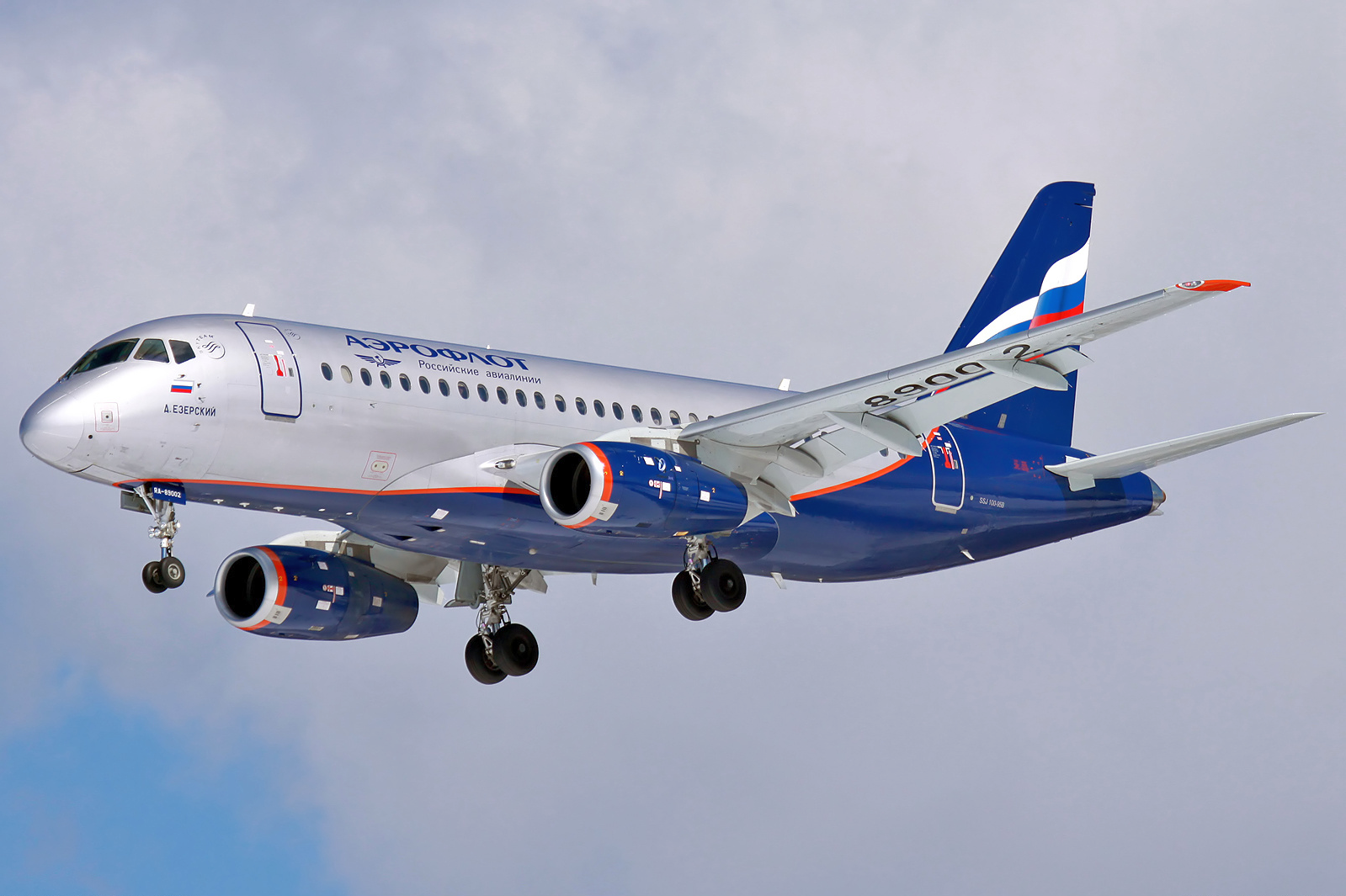
An Aeroflot Sukhoi Superjet 100, 2013

In May 2007, Finnair announced the sale of its last two self-owned McDonnell Douglas MD-11s to Aeroflot which became part of the Russian airline's cargo fleet in 2008 and 2009. On 31 December 2007, Aeroflot retired the last Tupolev Tu-134 after 40 years in service; the last flight flew the Kaliningrad–Moscow route. Aeroflot was forced to withdraw these aircraft from service due to noise restrictions. Fourteen Tu-134s comprised the type's fleet by that time; they were offered for sale to the sister companies. The retirement of the last Tupolev Tu-154 occurred on 14 January 2010, after 40 years of service; the last flight the type operated was Yekaterinburg–Moscow, taking place on 31 December 2009.

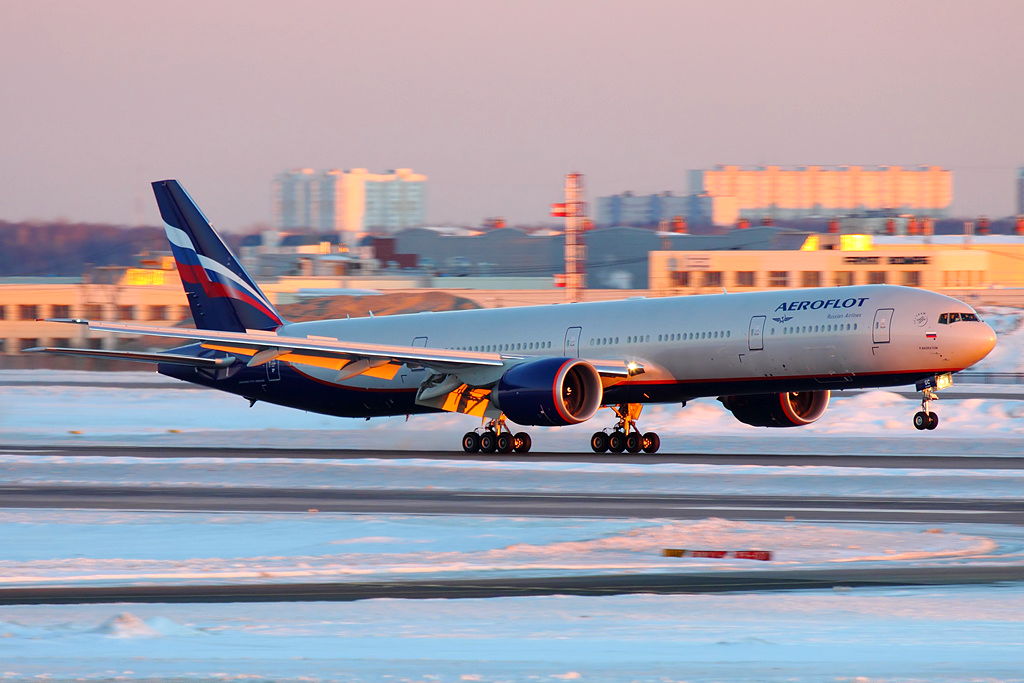
An Aeroflot Boeing 777-300ER lands at Sheremetyevo Airport in 2013. The type was first ordered in 2011.

In July 2010, Aeroflot announced a new A330 order during the Farnborough Airshow, this time for 11 A330-300s. Also in July 2010, Russian prime minister Vladimir Putin pressured Aeroflot to buy Russian-made aircraft for future expansion and fleet renewal.

In September 2010, Aeroflot announced that it had plans to order a total of 126 Russian-built Yakovlev MC-21s, Sukhoi Superjet 100s, Antonov An-140s, and Antonov An-148s. The aircraft are to be used for fleet replacement in Aeroflot, as well as six other airlines of which Aeroflot is taking control. In February 2011, the carrier ordered eight Boeing 777-300ERs; later that year, the order was boosted to sixteen aircraft. Aeroflot became the second worldwide operator of the Sukhoi Superjet 100 when Sukhoi delivered the first aircraft of the type to the company in June 2011. The first Boeing 777-300ER was handed over to the airline on 30 January 2013. Following delivery, it was planned to deploy the aircraft on the Moscow–Bangkok route, yet certification issues postponed these plans for days, as permission to operate the aircraft was granted a few days later. In addition to the current firm contract for 30 Sukhoi Superjet 100 aircraft, Aeroflot signed a letter of intent for a further 20 of the aircraft, announced in 2015.

Aeroflot retired its three McDonnell Douglas MD-11 freighters from active service in July 2013, citing their operation as no longer profitable.

In the first half of 2014, Sukhoi began to replace Aeroflot's "light" aircraft by "full" versions. The last "full" version was delivered in June 2014; "light" aircraft are operated by other Russian airlines.

In 2015, the company expanded its fleet with three Boeing 777-300ERs, six 737-800s and four Sukhoi Superjets; and retired five Ilyushin Il-96s. During the 2015 Paris Air Show, Aeroflot cancelled an order for 22 787 Dreamliners. In mid 2016, a deal for a further 10 leased Sukhoi Superjets was announced. In November 2016, Aeroflot cancelled eight Airbus A350-800s from an order including these aircraft and 14 A350-900s, and also announced that its cancelled Boeing 787 order would be transferred to Rostec subsidiary Avia Capital Services.

Aeroflot placed an order for 20 Sukhoi Superjet 100s in July 2017 during the MAKS Air Show. One month later, the airliner then approved plans to purchase additional 6 new Boeing 777-300ER to significantly strengthen the long-haul capabilities of its fleet, with deliveries of the aircraft scheduled from 2Q 2018 to 1Q 2019. This is followed by another order of 100 Sukhoi Superjet 100 planes, made on 10 September 2018. In addition to the orders, Aeroflot started to phase out its Airbus A330s in October 2019, in anticipation of bringing the Airbus A350s into service. A few months later, Aeroflot took in its first Airbus A350 XWB, being the first airline in the CIS and Eastern Europe to do so.

After sanctions as a result of the Russian invasion of Ukraine, aircraft leasing firms such as AerCap, Avolon and BOC Aviation terminated leases of Aeroflot's fleet. In September 2023, Aeroflot paid $645 million to acquire 17 aircraft and five spare jet engines that were leased to Aeroflot and owned by AerCap and were stranded in Russia upon the Russian invasion of Ukraine.

As of July 2022, Aeroflot ended its own Sukhoi Superjet 100 operations as these had all gradually been transferred to subsidiary Rossiya Airlines.
