= Vereshchyovka train disaster =

Railway catastrophy in USSR in 1944

Coordinates: 53.66773°N 34.38976°E

Details
- Date: January 24, 1944; 82 years ago 4:00
- Location: Vereshchyovka, Oryol Oblast, Russian SFSR, Soviet Union
- Country: Soviet Union
- Cause: Bridge collapse due to poor construction and design

Statistics
- Deaths: 600+

The Vereshchyovka train disaster was a railway accident that occurred near Vereshchyovka in Oryol Oblast, Soviet Union on 24 January 1944. Sources estimate that over 600 people died in the wreck, making it the deadliest train disaster in Soviet and Russian history.

== Background ==
In January 1944, the Soviet Union was in the midst of World War II, and the territory of Oryol Oblast had recently been recaptured from Nazi Germany. War damage had destroyed a lot of infrastructure in the area, especially the railways that were crucial to both the Soviets and the Germans. A section of the Moscow Railway near the village of Vereshchyovka (now located in Dyatkovsky District, Bryansk Oblast), around 45 kilometres (28 mi) north of Bryansk, had been the target of Soviet partisans. Previously, the tracks had run along a solid embankment, under which a stream flowed through a reinforced concrete pipe. However, partisans had recently bombed the embankment, blocking the outlet and leading to the creation of a small lake over the route of the railway. Due to the wartime need for supplies and personnel, Soviet engineers hastily built a temporary wooden bridge rather than drain the lake, forcing trains to slow to five kilometres per hour (3 mph). The section near Vereshchyovka would have seen heavy traffic to military and civilian trains.

== Accident ==
The disaster occurred at around 4 a.m. as the Vyazma–Bryansk passenger train approached the temporary wooden bridge spanning a recently formed lake. The train was transporting Red Army soldiers westwards to the front line of the Eastern Front, as well as civilian refugees returning to newly liberated lands in the west. Earlier on the night of the disaster, a freight train laden with heavy tanks had crossed the bridge, weakening its supports that were not built for such loads. As the passenger train crossed the bridge, the supports collapsed and caused the train to derail. Although many passengers were able to escape onto the ice of the frozen lake, it soon broke underneath them, plunging them into the icy water. Death toll estimates range from 600 to over 700 people, although the event was then shrouded in the fog of war and later cloaked in Soviet secrecy, rendering these numbers uncertain. Officially, the first documents compiled on the day of the crash indicate 47 dead and 50 injured.

A monument to the Vereshchyovka disaster was constructed in the 1990s after the dissolution of the Soviet Union.

== See also ==
- 1944 Ilford rail crash
