= Minino rail disaster =

Train crash at Minino Station

Details
- Date: June 2 1959
- Location: Krasnoyarsk Krai, Minino station
- Country: USSR
- Line: Krasnoyarsk Railway, Trans-Siberian Railway
- Operator: MPS USSR
- Incident type: Collision and fire
- Cause: False track-clear indication

Statistics
- Trains: Train No. 116 Krasnoyarsk – Abakan, freight train No. 1139, freight train No. 2448
- Deaths: 65
- Injured: 61

The Minino rail disaster was a train crash that happened at Minino station on June 2, 1959, in Krasnoyarsk Krai. Due to a faulty traffic light, a passenger train traveling from Krasnoyarsk - Abakan crashed into two freight trains. Sixty-five people died and sixty-one were injured in the crash.

== Timeline ==
On June 2, 1959, passenger train No. 116 Krasnoyarsk - Abakan driven by engineer Vladimir Vyrvich arrived at Minino station. On an adjacent track freight train No. 1139 arrived. For an unknown reason the exit traffic were closed forced both trains to stop even though no stop was scheduled. Even though the freight train passed, the entry traffic lights remained open.

Freight train No. 2448 hit the stationary oil tanker at 60 km/h causing the tank cars to pile up. The 50-ton fuel tankers derailed and were tossed to the adjacent track, overturning cars 9, 10 and 11 of train No.116. The tank cars spilled their fuel on to the track where it quickly ignited. The ignited fuel exploded the tank cars throwing oil products onto the wooden cars. Passengers were trapped in the cars with the exit doors jammed shut when the cars overturned. The wooden paneling on the cars was burning further trapping the passengers.

The engineer of train No.116, Vladimir Vyrvich quickly assessed the emergency situation. The last three cars were overturned preventing the rest of the passenger cars from escaping the fire. Vladimir Vyrvich heroically ran through the fire, and with his assistant managed to uncouple the eight intact cars. He then ran back to the locomotive and pulled the remain cars to safety. Vladimir Vyrvich suffered extensive burns while guarantying the safety of the eight cars. He later died in the hospital.

Only a few passengers in car No. 10 and 11 managed to survive. Passengers in car No.9 fared much better. Gennady Aleksandrovich Koliberda, 27, was riding in car No.9 along with his family. After the car overturned, Gennady Koliberda immediately broke a window and helped others escape. Only two people ended up dying in car No. 9 the rest were saved by Gennady Koliberda quick actions.

More than 65 people ended up dying in the disaster and 61 people were injured. Many of the casualties were from children returning form the Krasnoyarsk City Pioneer Rally to Abakan. The total number of fatalities is unknown. Information of the disaster was suppressed and the list of victims remains unknown. All the dead children were buried in a common grave in Minino, and a monument was erected there.
