= Ulu-Telyak =

Ulu-Telyak Улу-Теляк
- Selo
- Location within Bashkortostan Location within Russia
- Coordinates: 54°54′N 56°58′E
- Country: Russia
- Region: Bashkortostan
- District: Iglinsky District
- Time zone: UTC+5:00

Ulu-Telyak (Russian: Улу-Теляк; Bashkir: Оло Теләк, Olo Teläk) is a rural locality (a selo) and the administrative centre of Ulu-Telyaksky Selsoviet, Iglinsky District, Bashkortostan, Russia. The population was 3,408 as of 2010. There are 48 streets.

== Geography ==
Ulu-Telyak is located 53 km northeast of Iglino (the district's administrative centre) by road. Kirovsky is the nearest rural locality.
