= Vereshchovka =

Vereshchovka Верещовка
- Station
- Location within Bryansk Oblast Location within Russia
- Coordinates: 53°39′N 34°22′E
- Country: Russia
- Region: Bryansk Oblast
- District: Dyatkovsky District
- Time zone: UTC+3:00

Vereshchovka (Russian: Верещовка) is a rural locality (a station) in Dyatkovsky District, Bryansk Oblast, Russia. The population was 18 as of 2010. There are 5 streets.

== Geography ==
Vereshchovka is located 9 km north of Dyatkovo (the district's administrative centre) by road. Psursky Khutor is the nearest rural locality.
