= Valery Okulov =

Deputy Minister of Transport

- Валерий Окулов
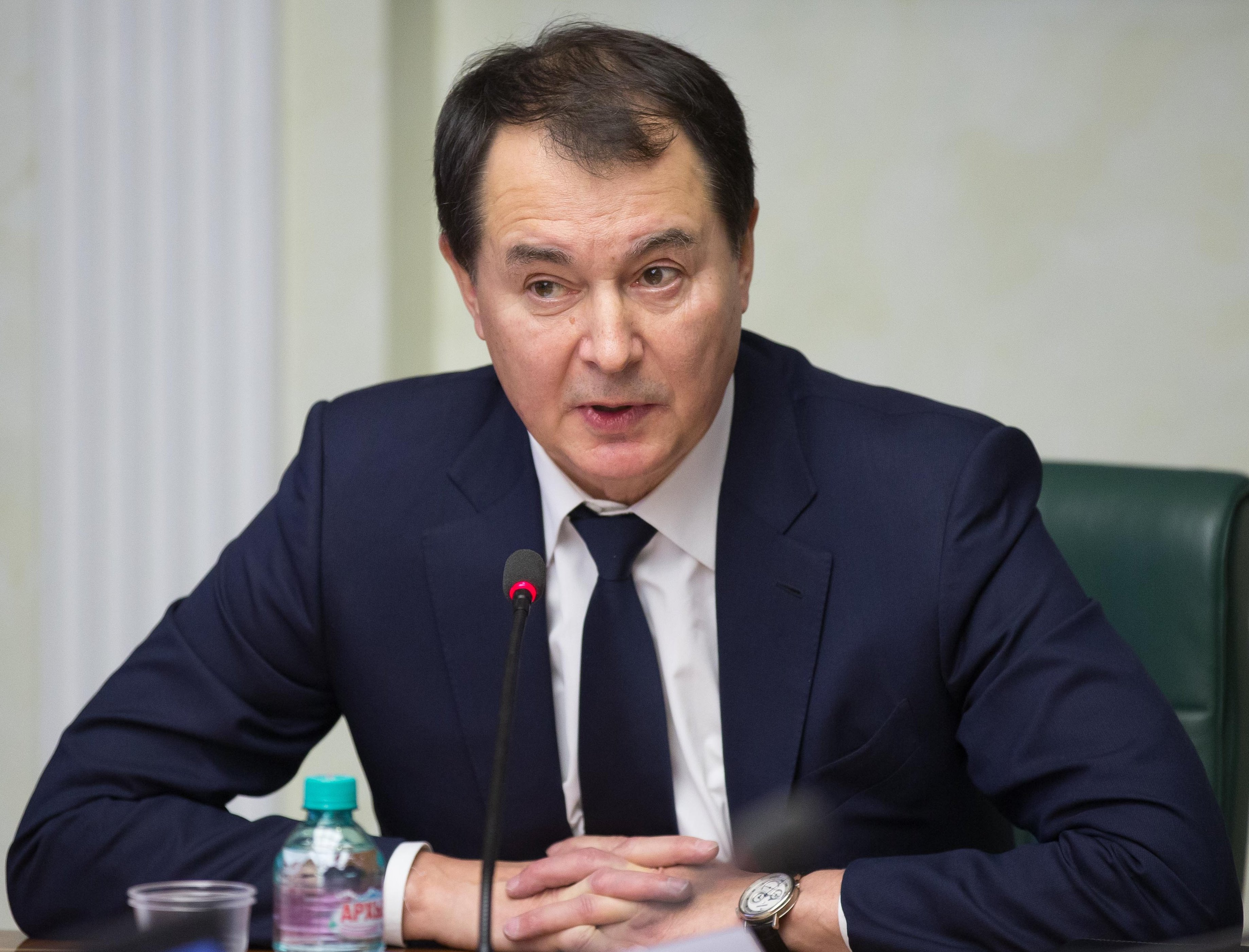
- Okulov in 2015
- Born: Valery Mikhailovich Okulov; 22 April 1952 (age 74)
- Education: Saint Petersburg State University of Civil Aviation
- Spouses: Svetlana Stepanovna Okulova; Elena Borisovna Okulova (Yeltsina)
- Children: Dmitry, Maria, Ivan
Awards

Valery Mikhailovich Okulov (Russian: Вале́рий Миха́йлович О́кулов; born April 22, 1952) is a Deputy Minister of Transport of the Russian Federation, the former general director of Aeroflot. The actual state of the Russian Federation 2 Class Advisor (22 September 2011).

== Biography ==
In 1975 he graduated from the navigator's Faculty of Saint Petersburg State University of Civil Aviation engineer-navigator.

Until 1985, he worked in the Sverdlovsk joint squadron of the Ural Civil Aviation Authority as a navigator of the An-24, An-12, and Tu-154 aircraft. In 1985, he was transferred to work at the Central Office of International Air Traffic (Moscow). He flew as a navigator on Tu-154, Il-86, An-124 airplanes, and worked as a lead navigator and mentor at the Aeroflot aviation personnel training center.

== Family ==
Wife Elena – the daughter of Boris Yeltsin and Naina Yeltsina.

Son Dmitry from marriage with Svetlana Okulova. Daughter Maria, son Ivan from marriage with Elena Okulova. Elena Okulova's daughter Catherine.

He has three grandchildren: Alexander Okulov (born in 1999, the son of Ekaterina Okulova). Mikhail and Fedor Zhilenkov (born in 2006, children of Maria Okulova-Zhilenkova and Mikhail Zhilenkov).

== Awards ==
- Order of Honour (2012)
