= Mikhail Poluboyarinov =

Russian businessman

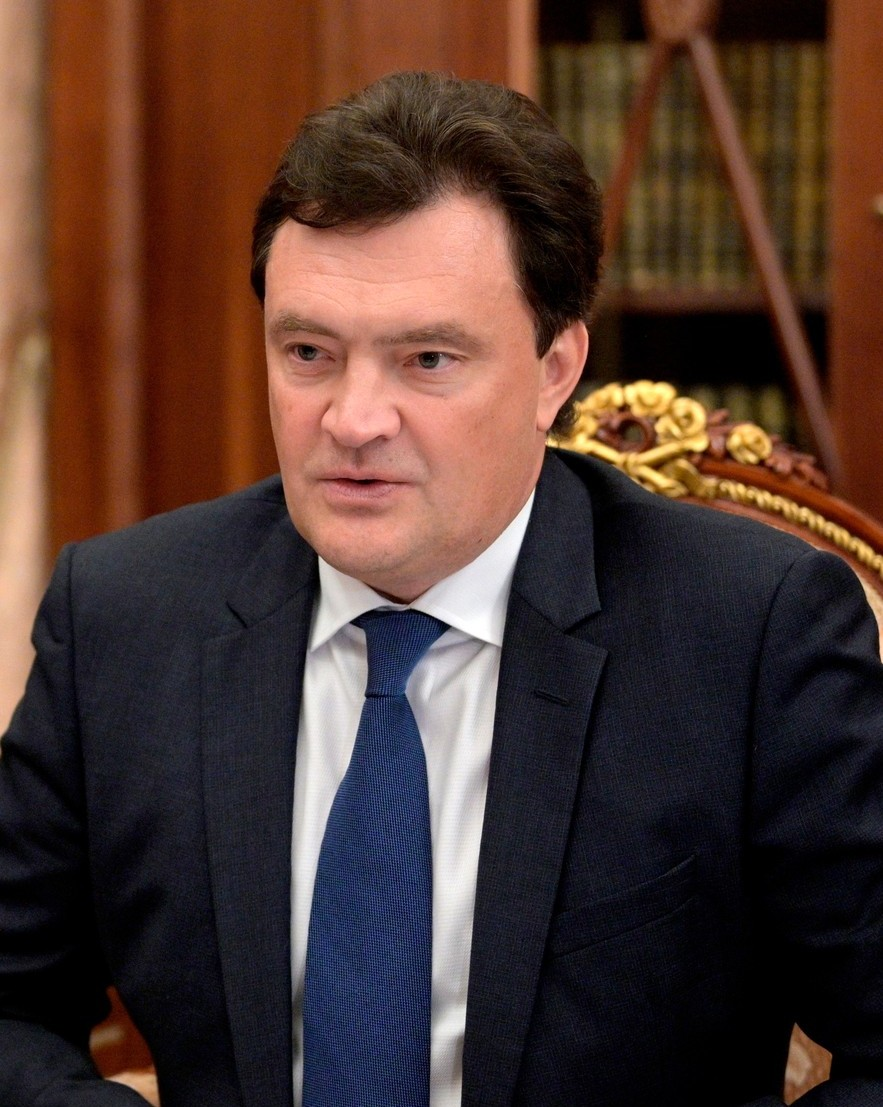
- Poluboyarinov in 2021

Personal details
- Born: April 2, 1966 (age 60) Moscow, Russian SFSR, USSR (now Moscow, Russia)
- Known for: ex-CEO of OJSC Aeroflot
- Awards: Order of Honour

Mikhail Igorevich Poluboyarinov (Russian: Михаил Игоревич Полубояринов; born April 2, 1966) is a Russian businessman, former CEO of Aeroflot, Russia's largest airline, since 20 November 2020 by April 2022 and current deputy CEO of Russian Post.

== Early life ==
Poluboyarinov was born on 2 April 1966 in Moscow. In 1988, he graduated from the Moscow Financial Institute with a degree in Finance and Credit. In 1998, after completing his postgraduate studies at the Plekhanov Russian University of Economics, he was awarded the qualification of candidate of economic sciences in the specialty of finance, money circulation and credit.

== Business career ==
After graduation, he worked in the central office of the Savings Bank of Russia until 1990.

From 1990 to 1999, he served as chief accountant and financial director at the Foreign Economic Society "Autoimport". Poluboyarinov served as chief accountant and deputy general director at JSC Aeroflot, from 2000 to 2009. From 2009 to 2020, he served as director of the infrastructure department and deputy chairman of the state developmental corporation VEB.RF. He later served as the first deputy chairman and member of the management board of VEB.RF.

From March to November 2020, he served as the general director of PJSC State Transport Leasing Company. In 2017, he headed the board of directors of Aeroflot. On November 20, 2020, he was elected CEO of Aeroflot replacing Vitaly Savelyev, who was appointed as Minister of Transport.

In October 2021, he was re-elected to the Board of Governors of the International Air Transport Association (IATA).

According to Forbes in 2020, Poluboyarinov ranks 52nd place in the list of '100 civil servants with the highest incomes'. His fortune was estimated at 285.7 million rubles.

=== Sanctions ===
On March 8, 2022, in response to the 2022 Russian invasion of Ukraine, Poluboyarinov was set on a list of sanctions by European Union. On 15 March, he was removed from the IATA board of governors. He was also included in the sanction lists of Australia, Canada, New Zealand, Switzerland, Ukraine and United Kingdom.

In March 2022, Lithuanian authorities seized his two properties in the Lithuanian coastal resort town of Palanga.

== Awards and honors ==
- Order of Honour: "for great contributions to the preparation and holding of the XXII Olympic Winter Games and the XI Paralympic Winter Games of 2014 in the city of Sochi".
- Certificate of honor of the Ministry of Transport: for services in the development of the Russian Far East.
- Honored Economist of the Russian Federation
