= Aeroflot =

National airline of Russia

Aeroflot – Russian Airlines Аэрофлот – Российские авиалинии

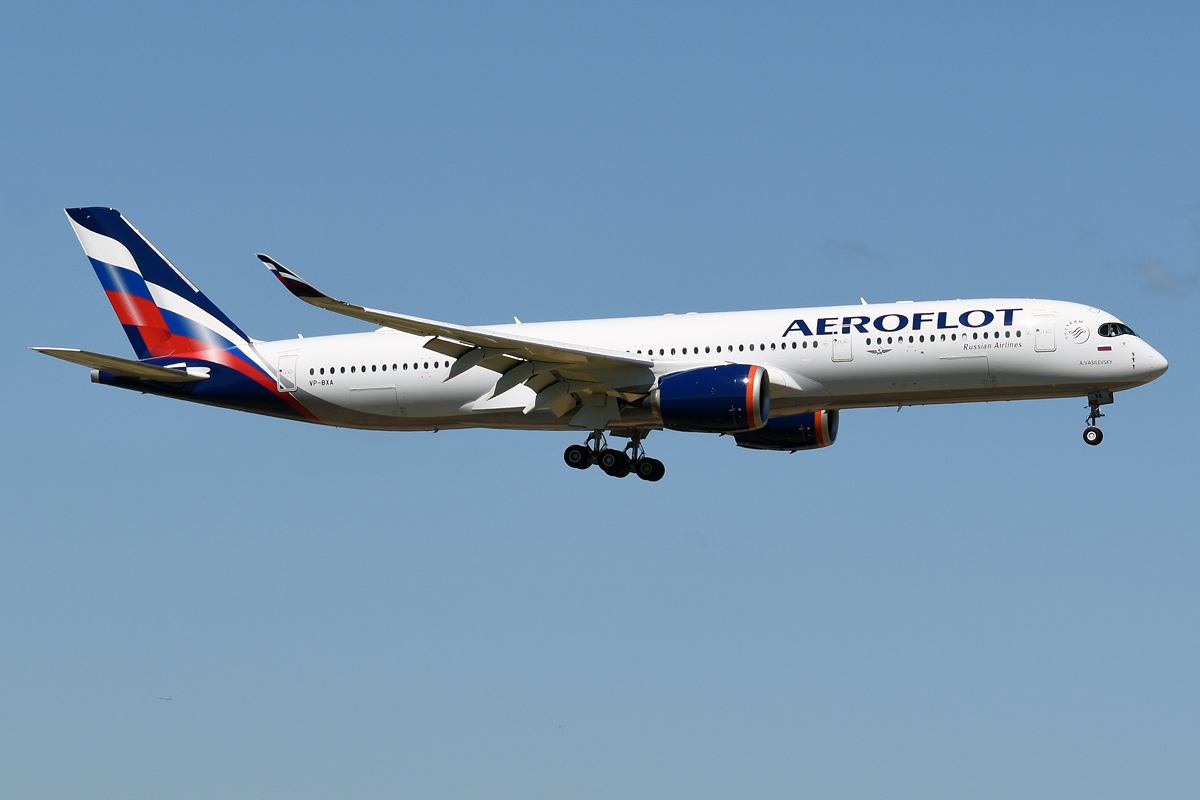
- An Aeroflot Airbus A350-900
IATA	ICAO	Call sign
SU	AFL	AEROFLOT
- Founded: 25 February 1932; 94 years ago
- Commenced operations: 25 February 1932; 94 years ago
- Hubs: Krasnoyarsk–International; Moscow–Sheremetyevo; Saint Petersburg
- Focus cities: Irkutsk; Khabarovsk; Sochi; Vladivostok; Yekaterinburg
- Frequent-flyer program: Aeroflot Bonus
- Alliance: SkyTeam (suspended); SkyTeam Cargo (suspended)
- Subsidiaries: Pobeda; Rossiya Airlines
- Fleet size: 171, excluding subsidiaries
- Destinations: 104 (airline group)
- Traded as: MCX: AFLT
- Headquarters: Moscow, Russia
- Key people: Sergei Alexandrovsky (chairman, CEO)
- Revenue: ▲ ₽612 billion (2023)
- Operating income: ▲ ₽182 million (2023)
- Net income: ▲ -₽14 million (2023)
- Total assets: ▼ ₽957 billion (2022)
- Total equity: ▼ -₽99 billion (2022)
- Employees: 33,500 (Aeroflot Group)
- Website: www.aeroflot.ru www.aeroflot.com

PJSC Aeroflot – Russian Airlines (Note: (Russian: ПАО «Аэрофло́т — Росси́йские авиали́нии», PAO Aeroflot — Rossiyskiye avialinii), commonly known as Aeroflot (English: /ˈɛəroʊˌflɒt/ or /ˌɛəroʊˈflɒt/; Russian: Аэрофлот, transl. "air fleet", pronounced [ɐɛrɐˈfɫot])) is the flag carrier and the largest airline of Russia. Aeroflot is headquartered in the Central Administrative Okrug, Moscow, with its hub being Sheremetyevo International Airport. The Federal Agency for State Property Management, an agency of the Government of Russia, owns 73.77% of the company, with the rest of the shares being public float.

During the time of the Soviet Union, Aeroflot was one of the largest airlines in the world. In 1992, following the dissolution of the Soviet Union, Aeroflot was divided into approximately 400 regional airlines informally known as Babyflots and was restructured into an open joint-stock company.

It has a market share in Russia of approximately 42.3%. Including subsidiaries, the company carried 55.3 million passengers in 2024. Aeroflot also owns Rossiya Airlines and Pobeda, a low-cost carrier. In 2022, the airline was banned from flying into the European Union.

The Aeroflot fleet, excluding subsidiaries, includes 171 airplanes: 112 Airbus planes and 59 Boeing planes. The company plans on making the Yakovlev MC-21 its flagship plane, with deliveries expected to start in 2027.

== History ==
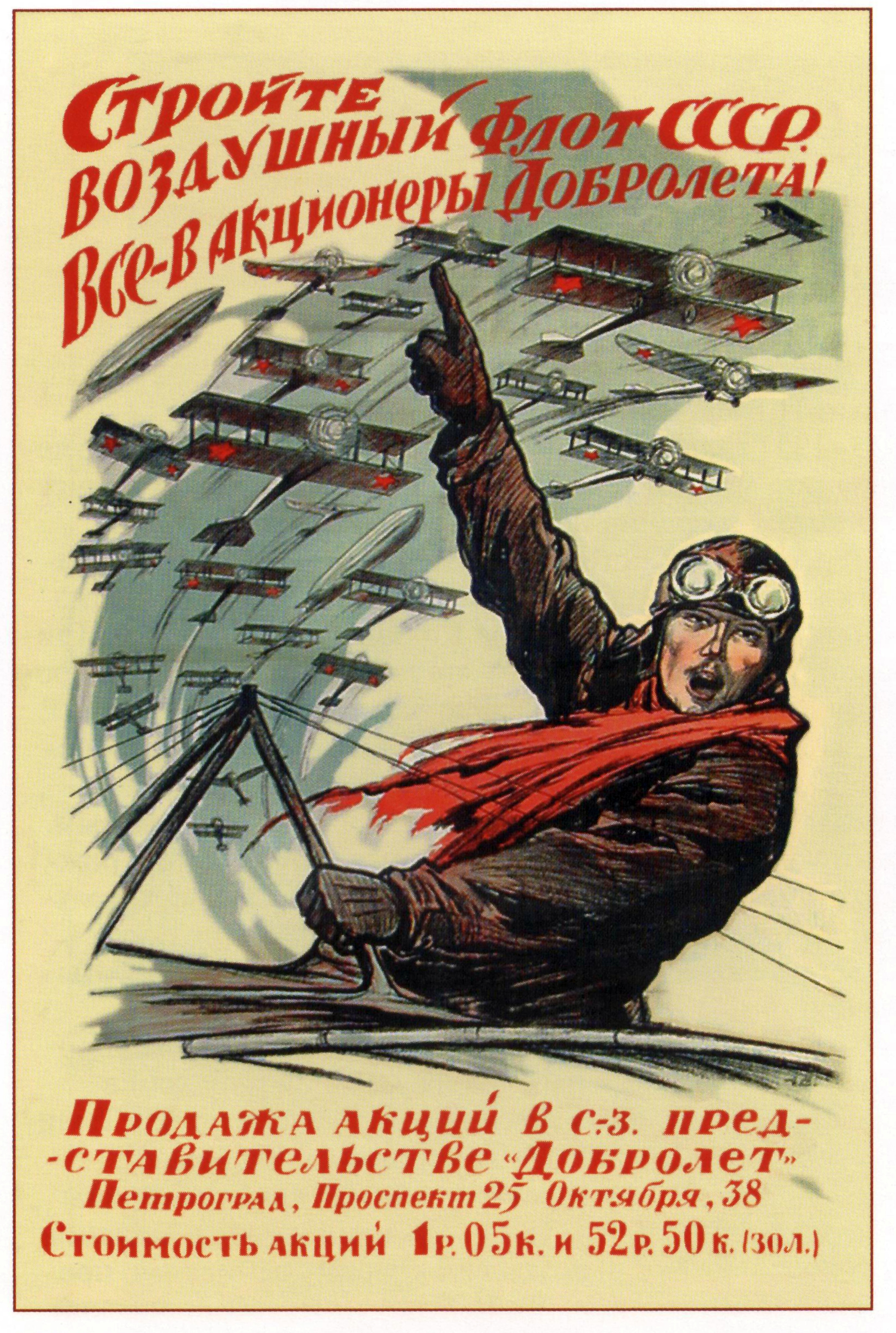
An early Soviet poster calling on citizens to buy stock in Dobrolyot

=== Early history of Soviet civil aviation (1921–23) ===
On 17 January 1921, the Sovnarkom of the Russian Soviet Federative Socialist Republic published "About Air Transportation". The document signed by its chair Vladimir Lenin set out the basic regulations on air transport over the territory of the RSFSR. The document was significant as it was the first time that a Russian state had declared sovereignty over its airspace. In addition, the document defined rules for the operation of foreign aircraft over the Soviet Union's airspace and territory. After Lenin issued an order, a State Commission was formed on 31 January 1921 for the purpose of civil aviation planning in the Soviet Union.

As a result of the commission's plans, Glavvozdukhflot (Russian: Главвоздухфлот (Главное управление воздушного флота), Chief Administration of the Civil Air Fleet) was established, and it began mail and passenger flights on the Moscow-Oryol-Kursk-Kharkov route on 1 May 1921 using Sikorsky Ilya Muromets aircraft. This was followed by the formation of Deruluft in Berlin on 11 November 1921, as a joint venture between the Soviet Union and Germany. The company, whose aircraft were registered in both Germany and the Soviet Union, began operations on 1 May 1922 with a Fokker F.III flying between Königsberg and Moscow. The service was initially operated twice a week and restricted to the carriage of mail.

On 3 February 1923, Sovnarkom approved plans for the expansion of the Red Air Fleet, and it is this date which was officially recognised as the beginning of civil aviation in the Soviet Union. On 9 February 1923, the Council of Labour and Defence passed a resolution to create the Civil Air Fleet of the USSR. After a resolution of the Central Committee of the Communist Party of the Soviet Union, the Enterprise for Friends of the Air Fleet (ODVF) was founded on 8 March 1923.

=== Dobrolyot (1923–32) ===
In February and March 1923, resolutions of the Council of Labour and Defence and the Central Committee of the Communist Party of the Soviet Union created civil aviation services in the Soviet Union, including the formation of 3 airlines: Dobrolyot in March 1923, Ukrvozdukhput in April 1923, based in Kharkov, and Zakavia in May 1923, based in Tiflis. Dobrolyot was formed in imitation of the Russian Merchant Navy Volunteer Fleet, Dobroflot, formed in 1878. According to its charter, it was formed "for the development of the civil air fleet within the USSR by organizing air lines for the transportation of passengers, mail and cargo, aerial photography and other areas of air fleet application based on the domestic aviation industry". The idea to create the airline was of Leon Trotsky. The basic objectives were the organisation of airmail, cargo and passenger lines, aviation related solutions of national economic problems (for example, aerial photography of localities) and also the development of the domestic aircraft industry. Dobrolyot constructed airports and weather stations.

Artist Alexander Rodchenko developed the corporate identity and advertising strategy of the company. He designed posters encouraging citizens to buy stock in Dobrolet and also designed the "Winged Hammer and Sickle" logo.

A capital of 2 million gold rubles was authorised to fund its early projects and this was later augmented by funds derived from the issuance of shares, which were initially offered to Soviet enterprises at the cost of one gold ruble each. Those who bought 25,000 shares were given the right to use a plane from its fleet. Within a year, capital expanded from 2 million rubles to 5 million rubles.

The airline primarily used aircraft made by Junkers.

Regular flights by Dobrolyot from Moscow to Nizhniy Novgorod commenced on 15 July 1923. In 1923, an agreement was signed establishing a subdivision of Dobrolyot based in Tashkent, operating to points in Soviet Central Asia. Services between Tashkent and Alma Ata began on 27 April 1924, and by the end of 1924 the subdivision had carried 480 passengers and 500 kilograms (1,100 lb) of mail and freight, on a total of 210 flights.

In March 1924, Dobrolyot began operating flights from Sevastopol to Yalta and Yevpatoriya in Crimea. Dobrolyot's route network was extended during the 1925–1927 period to include Kazan and regular flights between Moscow and Kharkov were inaugurated. Dobrolyot flights to Kharkov connected with Ukrvozdukhput services to Kiev, Odessa and Rostov-on-Don. In 1925, Dobrolyot operated 2,000 flights over a distance of 1,000,000 kilometres (620,000 mi), carrying 14,000 passengers and 127,500 kilograms (281,100 lb) of freight, on a route network extending to 5,000 kilometres (3,100 mi).

Ukrvozdukhput merged with Zakavia in 1925. Dobrolyot was transformed from a Russian to an all-Union enterprise on 21 September 1926 as a result of Sovnarkom resolutions, and in 1928 Dobrolyot was merged with Ukrvozdukhput, making it the only civil aviation airline in the Soviet Union.

In 1932, its name was changed to Transaviatsia. Responsibility for all civil aviation activities in the Soviet Union came under the control of the Chief Directorate of the Grazhdansky Vozdushny Flot (Civil Air Fleet) on 25 February 1932, and on 25 March 1932 the name "Aeroflot" was officially adopted for the entire Soviet Civil Air Fleet.

=== Aeroflot: early history (1932–1945) ===
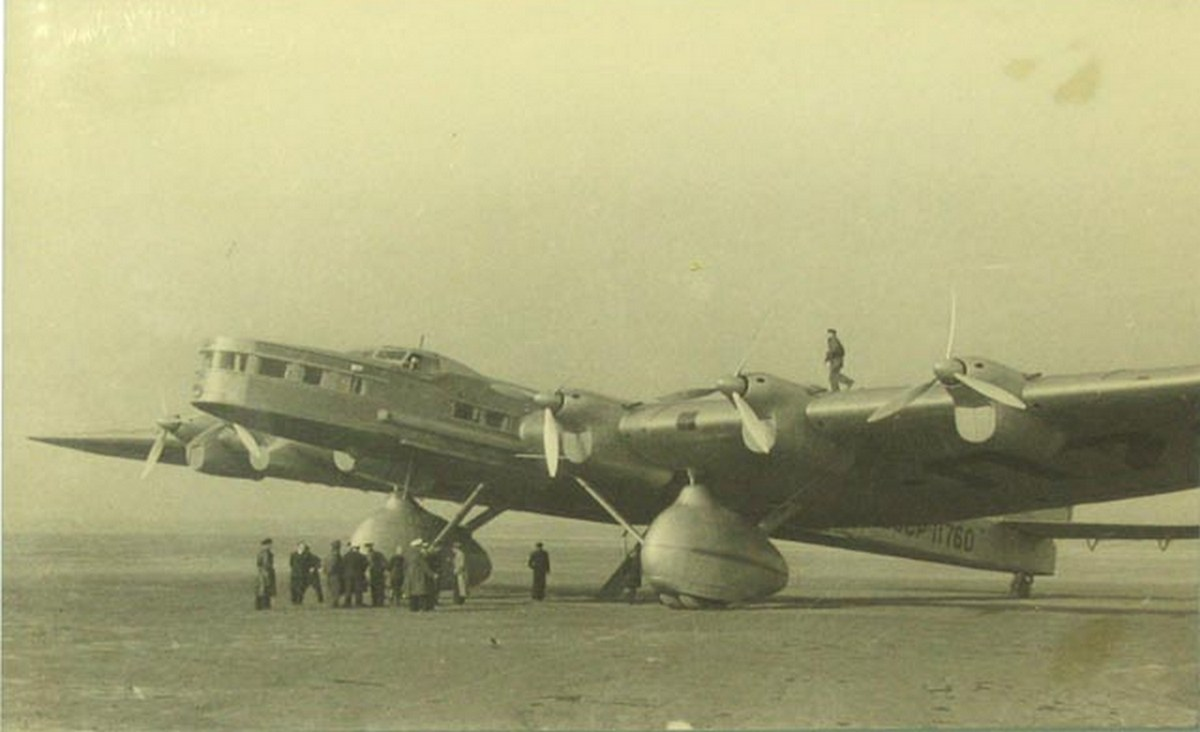
The Tupolev ANT-20bis was used for cargo flights from Moscow to Mineralnye Vody before World War II.

In 1933, the Communist Party of the Soviet Union Congress set out development plans for the civil aviation industry for the following five years, with air transportation becoming one of the primary means of transportation in the Soviet Union, linking all major cities. The government also implemented plans to expand the Soviet aircraft industry to reduce its dependence on foreign-built aircraft; in 1930, 50% of aircraft flying services in the Soviet Union were of foreign manufacture. The expansion of air routes that had taken shape in the late 1920s, continued into the 1930s. Local (MVL) services were greatly expanded in Soviet Central Asia and the Soviet Far East, which by the end of the second five-year plan in 1937 was 35,000 kilometres (22,000 mi) in length out of a total network of 93,300 kilometres (58,000 mi). The agreement between the Soviet Union and Germany relating to Deruluft expired on 1 January 1937. It wasn't renewed, which led to the joint venture carrier ceasing operations on 1 April 1937. On that date, Aeroflot began operations on the Moscow to Stockholm route, and began operating the ex-Deruluft route from Leningrad to Riga utilising Douglas DC-3s and Tupolev ANT-35s (PS-35s). Flights from Moscow to Berlin, via Königsberg, were suspended until 1940, when they were restarted by Aeroflot and Deutsche Luft Hansa as a result of the signing of the Molotov–Ribbentrop Pact, and they continued until the opening of the Eastern Front in World War II in 1941.

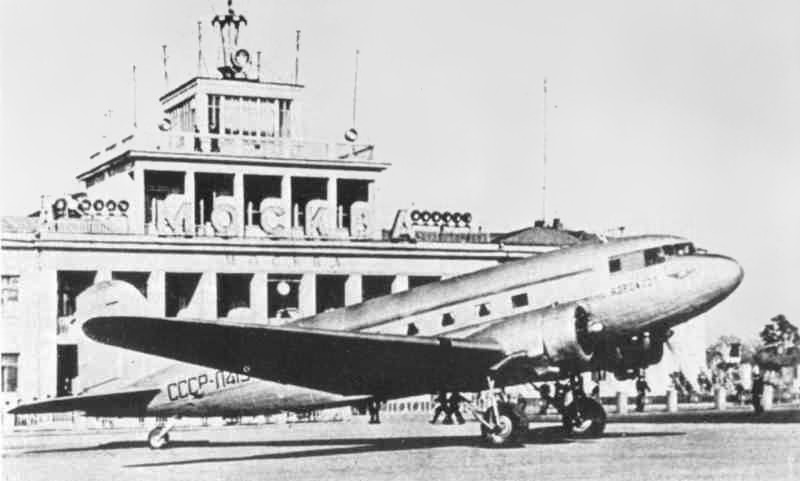
Aeroflot PS-84 (a Douglas DC-3, modified by fitment of Soviet engines) at Moscow City Airport in 1940. The Lisunov Li-2, a license-built version of the DC-3, became the backbone of the Aeroflot fleet after the opening of the Eastern Front in World War II.

Under the Third Five-Year Plan, which began in 1938, civil aviation development continued, with improvements to airport installations being made and the construction of airports being commenced. In addition to the expansion of services between the Soviet Union's main cities, local routes (MVL) were also expanded, and by 1940, 337 MVL routes had operations on a scheduled basis. Serial production of the Lisunov Li-2 (license-built Douglas DC-3) commenced in 1939, and the aircraft became the backbone of the Aeroflot fleet on mainline trunk routes. The day after Operation Barbarossa, the invasion of the Soviet Union by Nazi Germany, on 22 June 1941, the Sovnarkom placed the Civil Air Fleet under the control of Narkomat, leading to the full-scale mobilisation of Aeroflot crews and technicians for the Soviet war effort. Before the invasion, the Aeroflot network extended over 146,000 kilometres (91,000 mi), and amongst the longest routes being operated from Moscow were those to Tbilisi (via Baku), Tashkent and Vladivostok. Aeroflot aircraft, including PS-35s and PS-43s, were based at Khodynka Aerodrome in Moscow; and important missions undertaken by Aeroflot aircraft and crews included flying supplies to the besieged cities of Leningrad, Kyiv, Odessa and Sevastopol. During the Battle of Stalingrad, between August 1942 and February 1943, Aeroflot operated 46,000 missions to Stalingrad, ferrying in 2,587 tonnes (5,703,000 lb) of supplies and 30,000 troops. Following the defeat of the Wehrmacht, 80 Junkers Ju 52/3ms were captured from the Germans, and were placed into the service of the Civil Air Fleet, and after the war were placed into regular service across the Soviet Union. Whilst civil operations in European Russia west of the front line, which ran from Leningrad to Moscow to Rostov-on-Don, were prevented from operating because of the war, services from Moscow to the Urals, Siberia, Central Asia, and other regions which were not affected by the war, continued. By the end of the war, Aeroflot had flown 1,595,943 special missions, including 83,782 at night, and carried 1,538,982 men and 122,027 tonnes (269,023,000 lb) of cargo.

=== Aeroflot during the Cold War (1946–91) ===
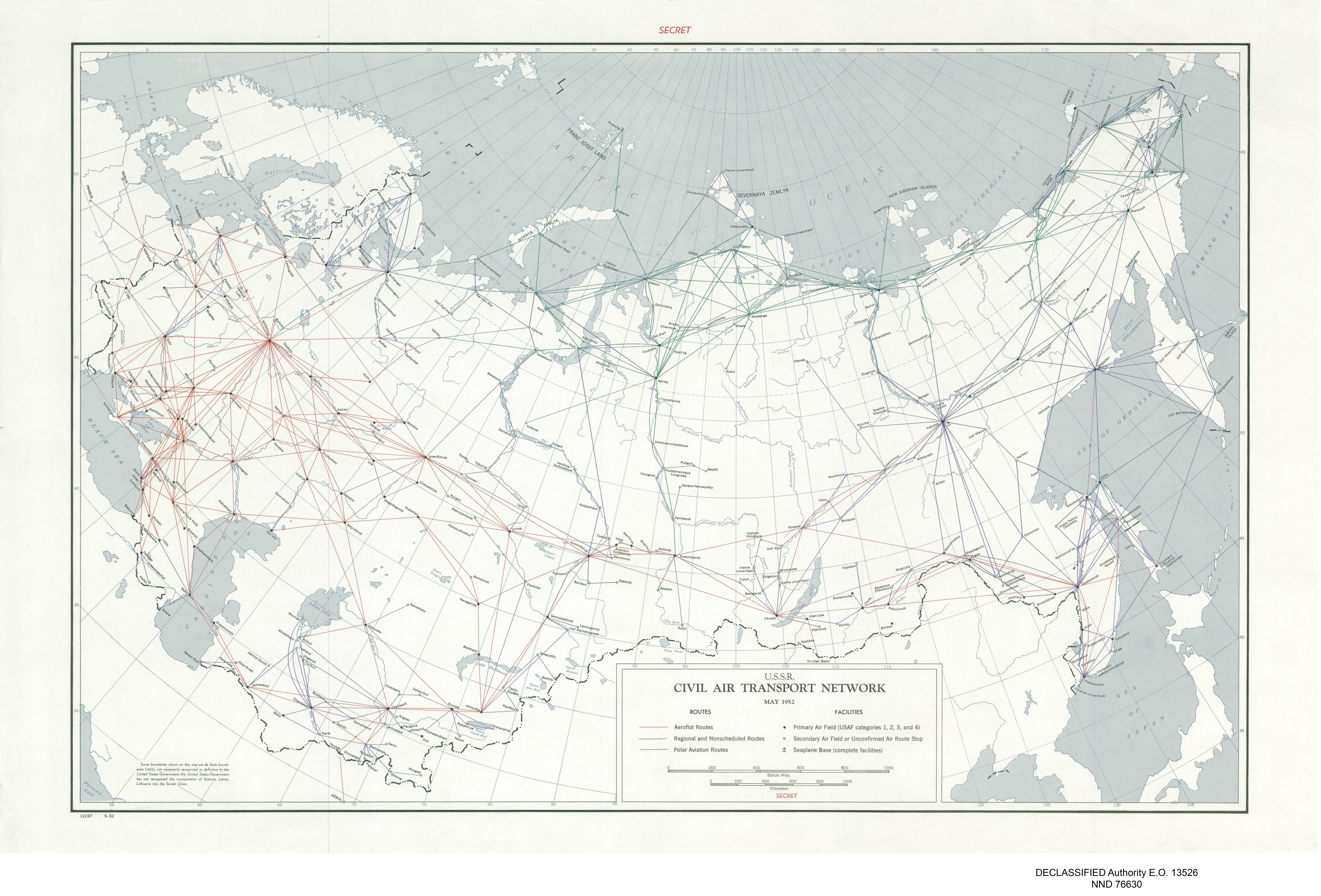
CIA map of USSR Civil Air Transport Network May 1952, including Aeroflot routes

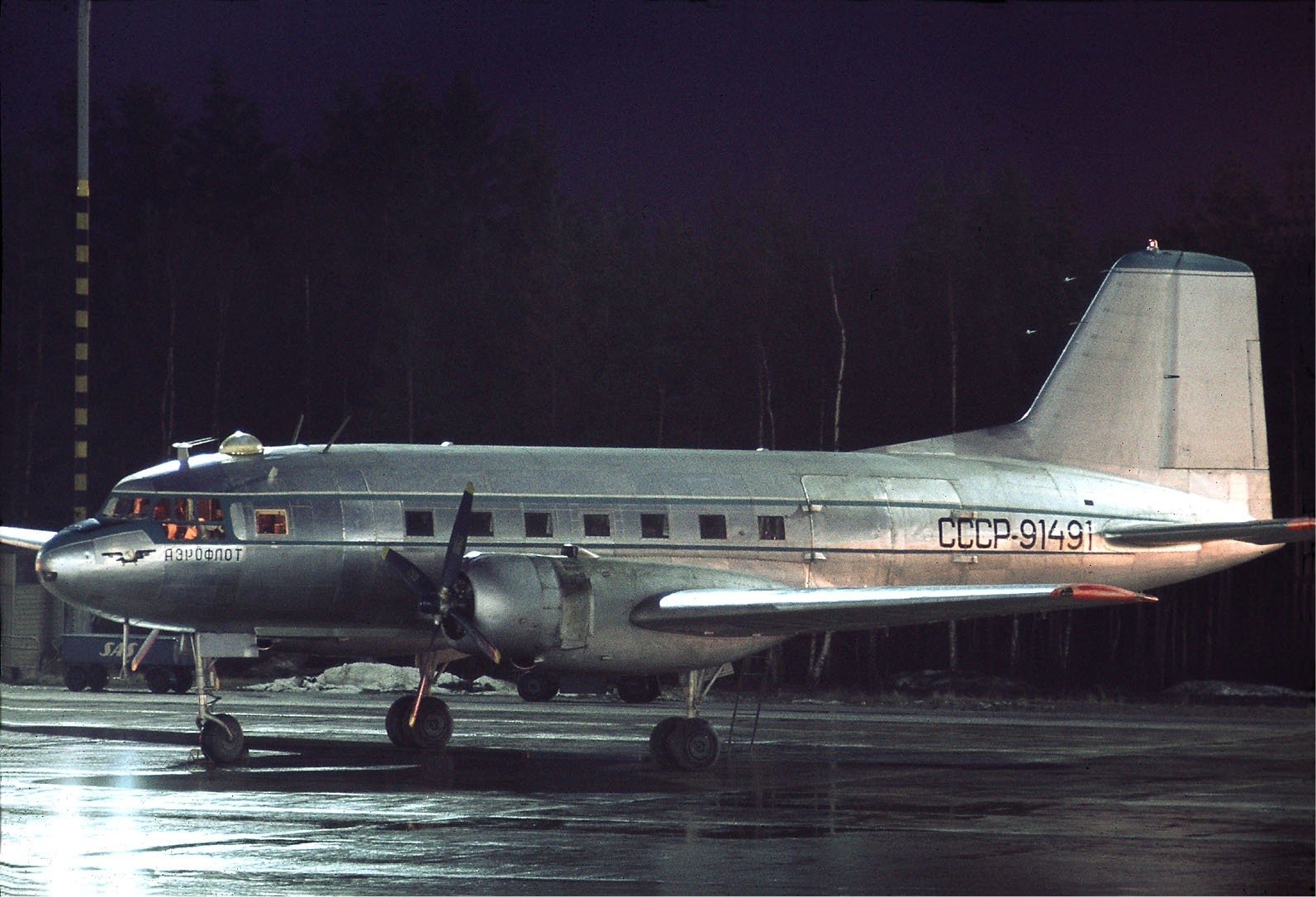
After its introduction in 1954, the Ilyushin Il-14 operated on Aeroflot's All-Union services.

At the end of World War II, the Soviet government repaired and rebuilt essential airport infrastructure, and it strengthened the Aeroflot units in the European part of the Soviet Union. In 1945, Aeroflot carried 537,000 passengers, compared with 359,000 in 1940. The government made it a priority in the immediate postwar years to expand services from Moscow to the capital of each of the Republics of the Soviet Union, in addition to important industrial centres on the country and transferred to Aeroflot many Lisunov Li-2s, which became the backbone of the Aeroflot fleet. The Ilyushin Il-12 entered service on Aeroflot's all-Union scheduled routes on 22 August 1947, and supplemented already existing Li-2 services. The original Ilyushin Il-18 entered service around the same time as the Il-12, and was operated on routes from Moscow to Yakutsk, Khabarovsk, Vladivostok, Alma Ata, Tashkent, Sochi, Mineralnye Vody and Tbilisi. By 1950, the Il-18 was withdrawn from service, replaced by Il-12s. MVL and general aviation services received a boost in March 1948, when the first Antonov An-2s were delivered and entered service in Central Russia. The development of MVL services over the latter years was attributed to the An-2, which Aeroflot operated in all areas of the Soviet Union.

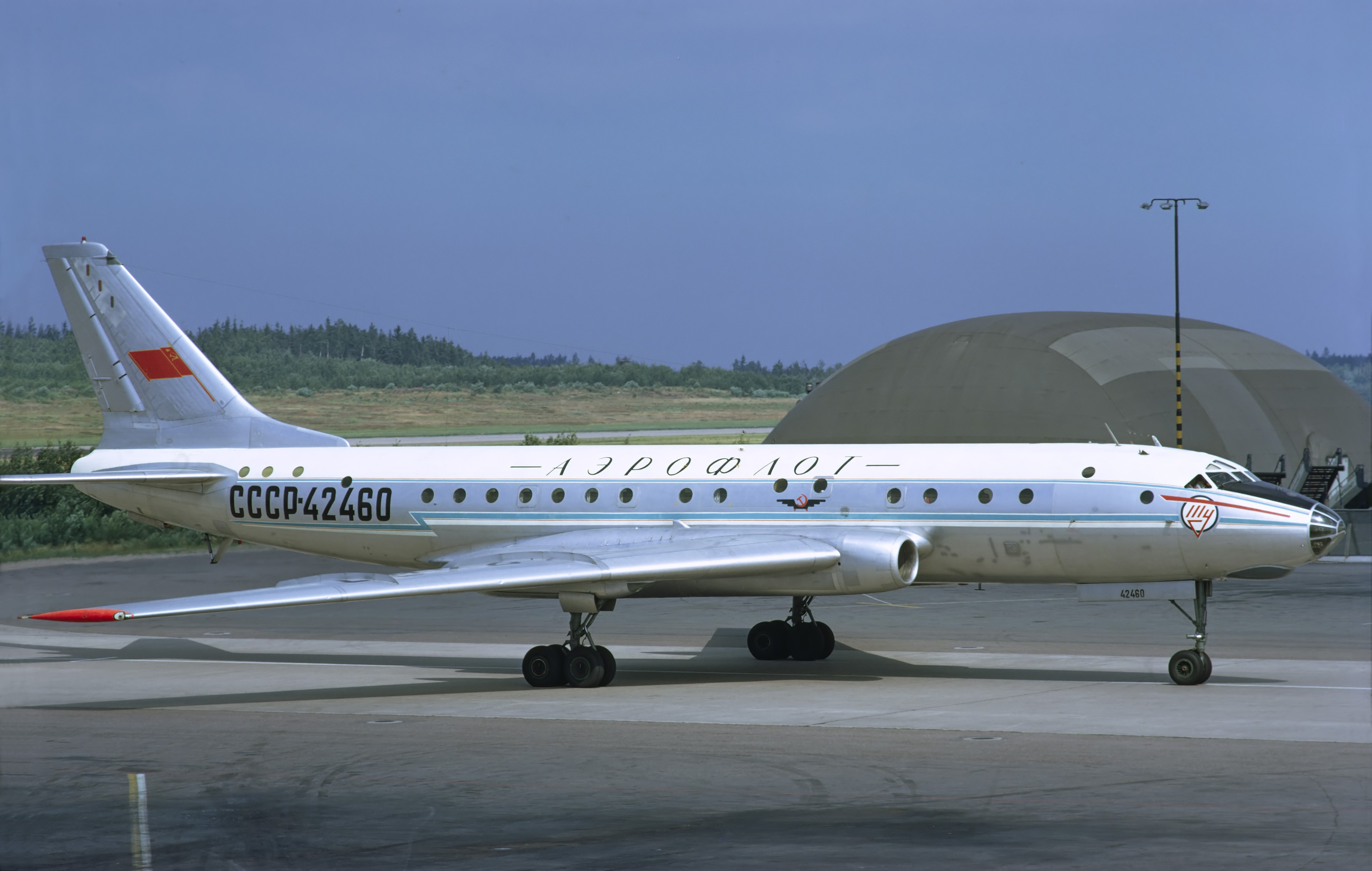
Aeroflot became the first airline in the world with sustained jet aircraft service, when it introduced the Tupolev Tu-104 in 1956.

Aeroflot's route network had extended to 295,400 kilometres (183,600 mi) by 1950, and it carried 1,603,700 passengers, 151,070 tonnes (333,050,000 lb) of freight, and 30,580 tonnes (67,420,000 lb) of mail that year. Night flights began in the same year, and the fifth five-year plan, covering the period 1951–1955, emphasised Aeroflot's expansion of nighttime operations, which vastly improved aircraft utilisation. By 1952, 700 destinations in the Soviet Union received regular flights from Aeroflot. On 30 November 1954, the Ilyushin Il-14 entered service, and the aircraft took a leading role in the operation of Aeroflot's all-Union services. The number of passengers carried in 1955 increased to 2,500,000, whilst freight and mail carriage also increased, to 194,960 and 63,760 tons, respectively. By this time, Aeroflot's route network covered a distance of 321,500 kilometres (199,800 mi). The 20th Congress of the Communist Party of the Soviet Union, held in 1956, included plans for Aeroflot services to be dramatically increased 3.8 times, with a target of 16,000,000 annual passengers by 1960. To meet these goals, Aeroflot introduced higher-capacity turbojet and turbine-prop aircraft on key domestic routes and on services to Aeroflot destinations abroad. A major step for Aeroflot occurred on 15 September 1956 when the Tupolev Tu-104 jet aircraft entered service on the Moscow–Omsk–Irkutsk route, marking the world's first sustained jet airline service. The airline began international flights with the type on 12 October 1956 under the command of Boris Bugayev with flights from Moscow to Prague. The aircraft placed Aeroflot in an enviable position, as airlines in the West had operated throughout the 1950s with large piston-engined aircraft. By 1958, the route network covered 349,200 kilometres (217,000 mi), and the airline carried 8,231,500 passengers, and 445,600 tons of mail and freight, with fifteen percent of all-Union services being operated by jet aircraft.

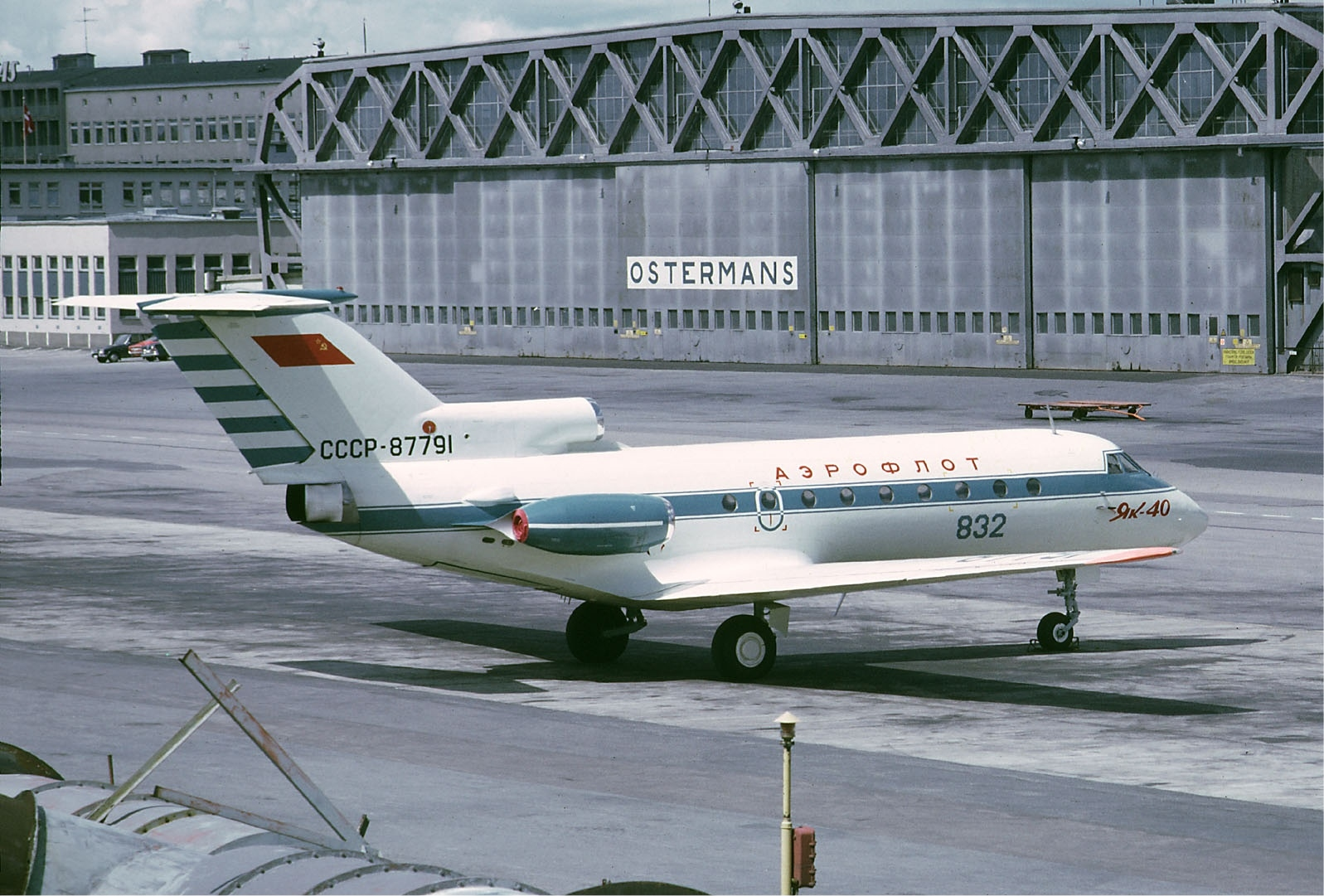
The Yakovlev Yak-40, introduced in September 1968.

Aeroflot introduced the Antonov An-10 and Ilyushin Il-18 in 1959, and together with its existing jet aircraft, the airline was able to extend services on modern aircraft to twenty one cities by 1960. The Tupolev Tu-114, then the world's largest airliner, entered service with the Soviet carrier on 24 April 1961 on the Moscow-Khabarovsk route; covering a distance of 6,980 kilometres (4,340 mi) in 8 hours 20 minutes. The expansion of the Aeroflot fleet saw services with modern aircraft being extended to forty-one cities in 1961, with fifty percent of all-Union services being operated by these aircraft. This fleet expansion also saw the number of passengers carried in 1961 skyrocket to 21,800,000. Further expansion came in 1962 when both the Tupolev Tu-124 and Antonov An-24 entered regular service with Aeroflot on various medium and short-haul routes. By 1964, Aeroflot operated direct flights from Moscow to 100 cities, from Leningrad to 44 cities, and from Kyiv to 38 cities. The airline also operated direct flights from Mineralnye Vody to 48 cities across the Soviet Union, denoting the importance of the operation of holiday aircraft services to Aeroflot. Statistics for the same year showed Aeroflot operating an all-Union route network extending over 400,000 kilometres (250,000 mi), and carrying 36,800,000 passengers.

By 1966, Aeroflot carried 47,200,000 passengers over a domestic route network of 474,600 kilometres (294,900 mi). For the period of the Eighth Five-Year Plan, which ran from 1966 to 1970, Aeroflot carried a total of 302,200,000 passengers, 6.47 billion tons of freight, and 1.63 billion tons of mail. During the five-year plan period, all-Union services were extended over an additional 350 routes; an additional 1,000 MVL routes were begun, and 40 new routes were opened up with all-cargo flights. In 1967, the Ilyushin Il-62 and Tupolev Tu-134 were introduced, and in September 1968, the Yakovlev Yak-40 regional jet began operations on short-haul services. That same year, the Il-62 inaugurated the long-delayed service between Moscow and New York, which finally began in July and was operated jointly by Aeroflot and Pan Am. According to the book The Aeroflot Story: From Russia With Luck: "This business relationship became an acrimonious affair in which both parties complained it had been wronged by the other. Pan Am accused the Soviets of illegally siphoning away Moscow-to-New York passengers, whilst in turn, Aeroflot accused U.S. consular officials in Russia of having steered passengers to Pan Am flights." In 1968, the company opened its first office in the United States.

Flag of Aeroflot (1961–1991)

By 1970, the last year of the five-year plan period, Aeroflot was operating flights to over 3,500 destinations in the Soviet Union, and at the height of the 1970 summer holiday season, the airline was carrying approximately 400,000 passengers per day, and 90% of passengers were being carried on propeller-turbine and jet aircraft. In March 1970, Aeroflot had amassed a route network that was 600,000 kilometres (370,000 miles) long, a quarter of which covered international destinations. At this time, the carrier had agreements with 59 countries but it only served 54 of them, including 55 destinations. In January 1971, the Central Administration of International Air Traffic (Russian: Центральное управление международных воздушных сообщений) (TsUMVS) was established within the framework of IATA, and became the sole enterprise authorised to operate international flights. Abroad, the airline was known as Aeroflot Soviet Airlines. In 1976, Aeroflot carried its 100 millionth passenger. Its flights were mainly concentrated around the Soviet Union, but the airline also had an international network covering five continents: North and South America, Europe, Africa, and Asia. The network included countries such as the United States, Canada, the United Kingdom, Spain, Cuba, Mexico, and the People's Republic of China.

Irish author Dervla Murphy described travelling with the carrier to Madagascar in 1983: "Aeroflot is commendably austere: no wasteful bumph in the seat-pockets, no duty-free luxuries for sale, no professional (or other) smiles from the cabin-staff. But our lunch was good, apart from a macabre white wine which only the Russians could swallow." The 17-hour flight from Moscow to Antananarivo included "four long refuelling stops", but Murphy noted how she, along with the other passengers, had been "attracted by Aeroflot's sensationally low fares."

Aeroflot service between the Soviet Union and the United States was interrupted from 15 September 1983 until 2 August 1990, following an executive order by U.S. President Ronald Reagan revoking Aeroflot's license to operate flights into and out of the United States following the downing of Korean Air Lines Flight 007 by the Soviet Air Force. Flights resumed in April 1986. At the start of the 1990s, Aeroflot reorganised again giving more autonomy to territorial divisions. R. E. G. Davies, former curator of the Smithsonian Institution, claims that by 1992, Aeroflot had over 600,000 people operating over 10,000 aircraft.

==== Other functions ====
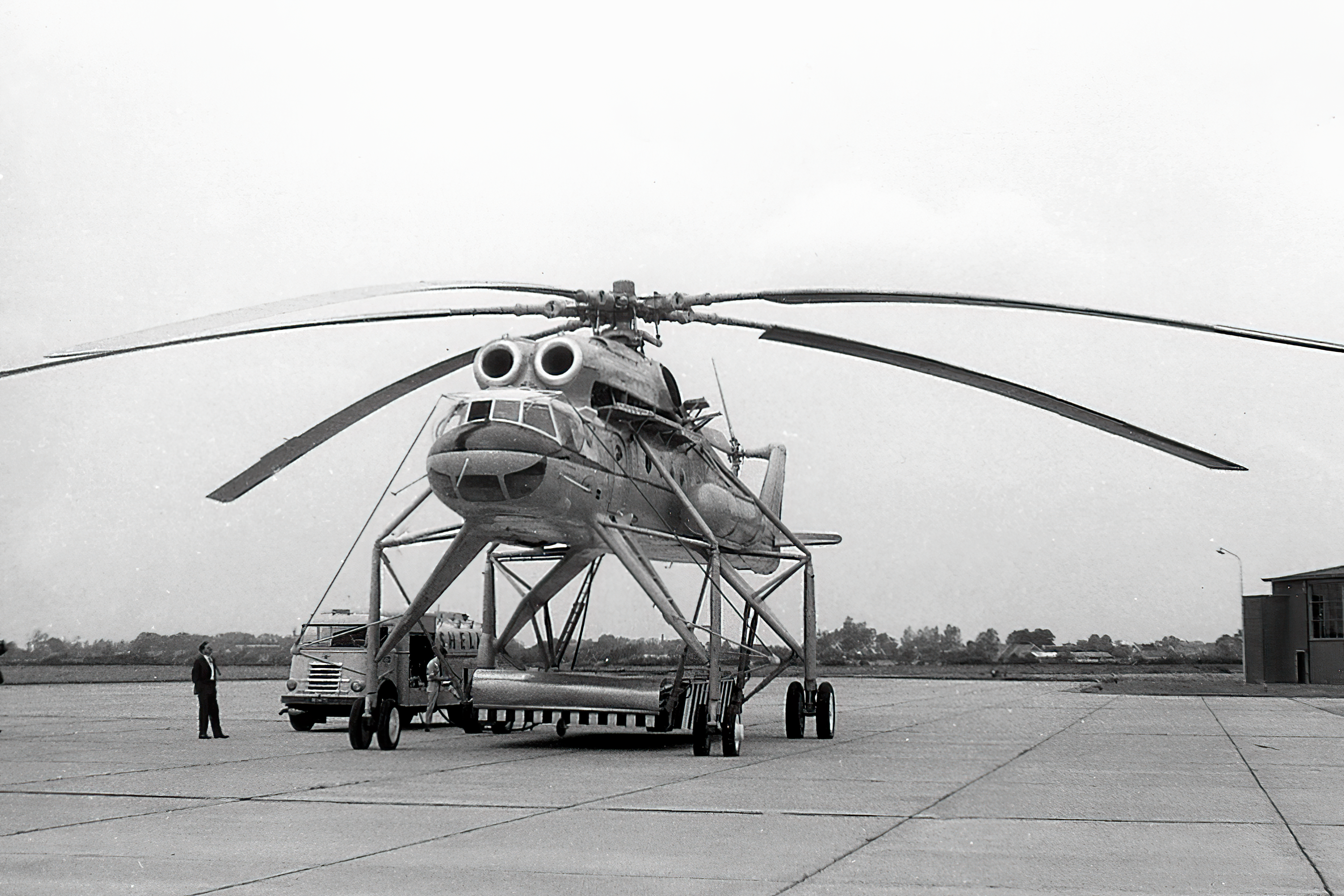
Aeroflot Mi-10 heavy lift helicopter seen at Groningen Airport in the early 1970s

Aeroflot had a monopoly on all civil aviation activities within the Soviet Union, including services related to air ambulance; aerial application; heavy lifting for the Soviet space program; offshore oil platform support; exploration and aeromagnetic survey for natural resources; support for construction projects; transport of military troops and supplies (as an adjunct to the Soviet Air Force); atmospheric research; and aerial surveillance. It operated hundreds of helicopters, cargo aircraft, and civil airliners. It also operated the Soviet equivalent of a presidential aircraft and other VIP transports of government and Communist Party officials. Aeroflot was also responsible for such services as ice patrol in the Arctic Ocean and escorting of ships through frozen seas; oil exploration; power line surveillance; and transportation and heavy lifting support on construction projects. For the latter tasks, Aeroflot used, in addition to smaller helicopters, the Mil Mi-10 flying crane capable of lifting 11,000 to 14,000 kilograms (24,000 to 31,000 lb). Hauling of heavy cargo, including vehicles, was performed by the world's largest operational helicopter, the Mil Mi-26. Its unusual eight-blade rotor enabled it to lift a maximum payload of 20 tons. The medium- and long-range passenger- and cargo aircraft of Aeroflot were also part of the strategic air transport reserve, ready to provide immediate airlift support to the armed forces. Short-range aircraft and helicopters were available for supporting military operations. Aeroflot also participated in espionage during the Cold War.

=== Post-Soviet Aeroflot (1992–) ===
The "winged hammer and sickle" is the most recognisable symbol of Aeroflot.

After the Dissolution of the Soviet Union in 1991, service expanded significantly. Up until that time, Aeroflot had been the only establishment providing air services throughout the Soviet Union, but with its breakup, Aeroflot branches of these countries began their own services, and the airline itself came under control of Russia, the largest of the CIS republics, and was renamed Aeroflot – Russian International Airlines (ARIA). In 1992, Aeroflot was divided into approximately 400 regional airlines informally known as Babyflots, which included BAL Bashkirian Airlines, KrasAir, Moscow Airways and Tatarstan Airlines, with Aeroflot keeping the international routes.

In 1994, Aeroflot was registered as a joint-stock company and the government sold 49% of its stake to Aeroflot employees. In the 1990s, Aeroflot was primarily focused on international flights from Moscow. However, by the end of the decade, Aeroflot expanded in the domestic market. In 2000, the company name was changed to Aeroflot – Russian Airlines to reflect the change in the company's strategy. The Aeroflot fleet shrank dramatically in the post-Soviet era, dropping from 5,400 planes in 1991 to 115 in 1996.

In 1995, Boris Berezovsky played a key role in a management reshuffle that led to Nikolai Glushkov becoming CFO of the company. The two were later accused of embezzling from the airline, laundering the money through two Swiss companies, Forus and Andava. In 2010, CHF51 million in frozen assets in Swiss bank accounts were returned to Aeroflot.

In the early 2000s, the airline hired British consultants for rebranding. From the start, plans were afoot to replace the hammer and sickle logo, a symbol of Soviet communism; despite this the logo was not scrapped, as it was the most recognisable symbol of the company for over 70 years. A new Aircraft livery and uniforms for flight attendants were designed, and a promotional campaign was launched in 2003. Its fleet has undergone a major reorganisation during which most of the Soviet aircraft were replaced by Western-built jets; concerns over fuel consumption rather than safety concerns were cited for such a move. Airbus A319s and A320s for short-haul flights in Europe; and Boeing 767s and Airbus A330s for medium- and long-haul routes; were gradually incorporated into the Aeroflot fleet. Aeroflot began working with the U.S. travel technology firm Sabre Corporation in 1997, and in 2004, signed an agreement to use Sabre's software as its new computer reservation system, further extending the relationship with Sabre in 2010. On 29 July 2004, a new corporate slogan was adopted: "Sincerely Yours. Aeroflot".

In April 2006, Aeroflot became the tenth airline to join SkyTeam, and the first air carrier in the former Soviet Union to do so. The company announced plans to increase cargo operations. It registered the Aeroflot-Cargo trademark in 2006.

Aeroflot became the sole shareholder of Donavia—a domestic airline then-named Aeroflot-Don—in December 2006, when it boosted its stake in the company from 51% to 100%; soon afterwards, Aeroflot-Nord was created following the buyout of Arkhangelsk Airlines.

==== Expansion and reorganisation ====
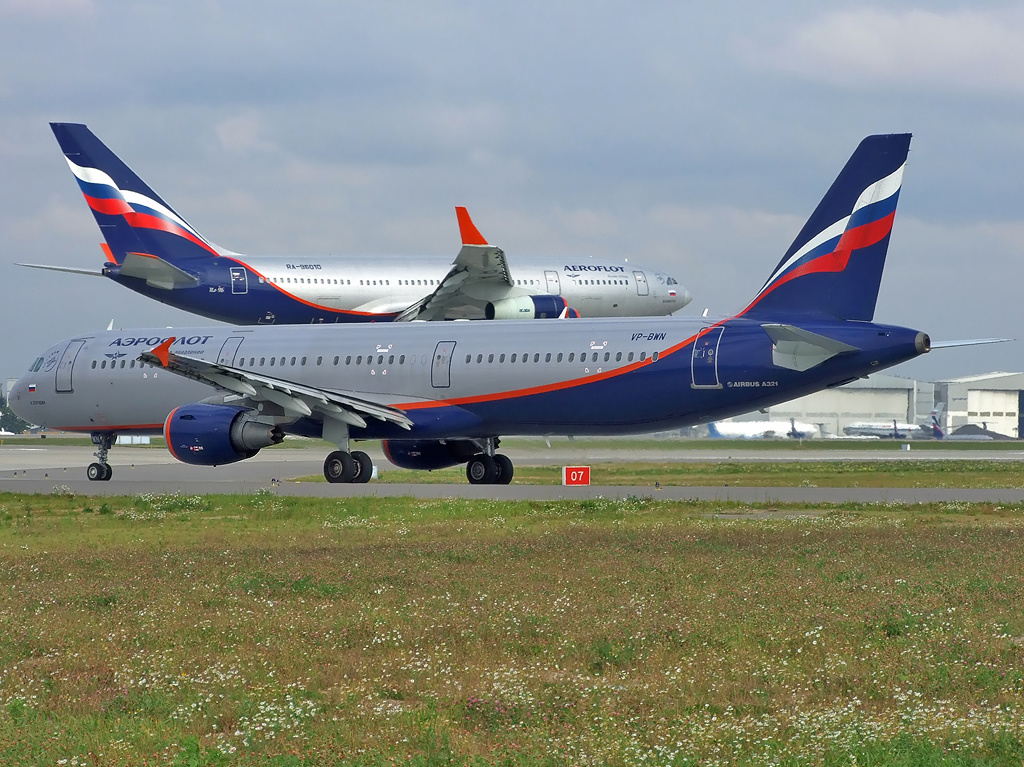
A new Airbus A321 holds for departure whilst an Ilyushin Il-96 lands at Aeroflot's Moscow-Sheremetyevo hub in 2008

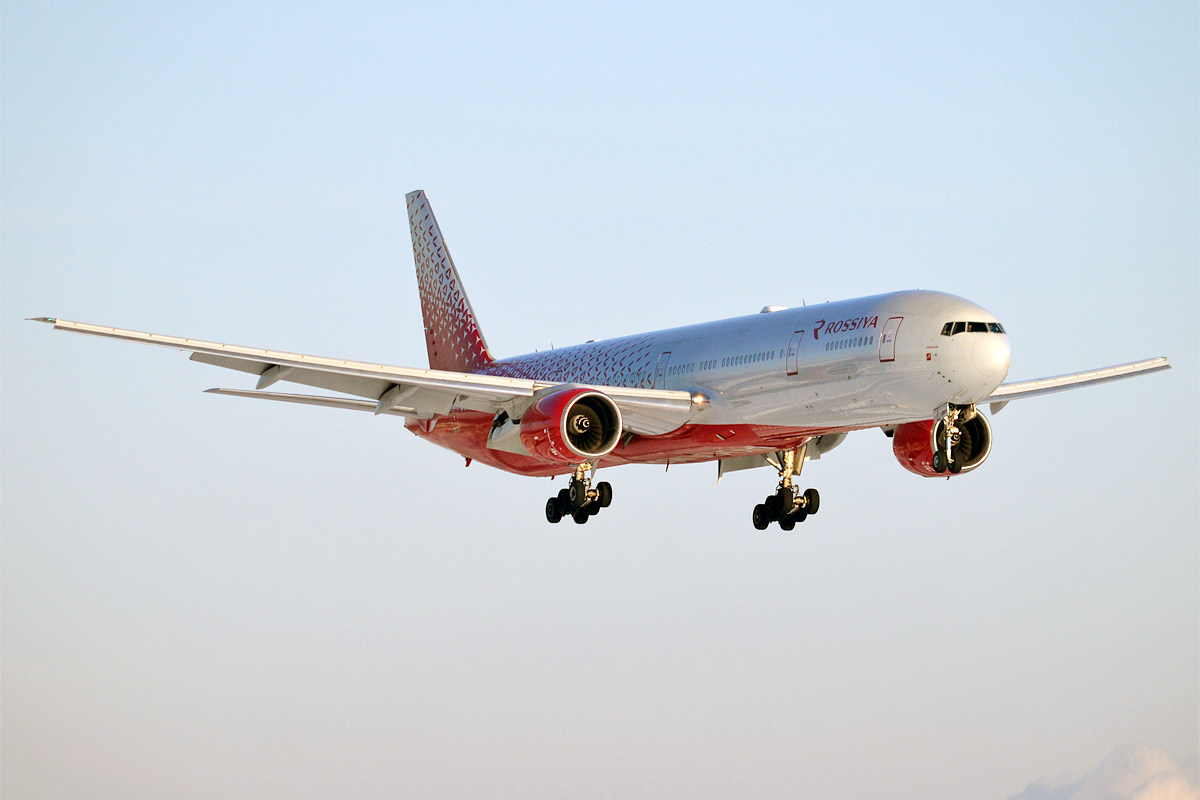
Rossiya Airlines' Boeing 777-300 in the new livery in 2016. In November 2011, Aeroflot received 75% minus one share of Rossiya along with the shares of four other carriers.

In December 2009, after it filed for bankruptcy, Aeroflot-Cargo merged into Aeroflot.

In November 2011, Rostec, a state agency, merged five airlines it owned - Vladivostok Avia, Saravia, Rossiya Airlines, SAT Airlines and Orenair - into Aeroflot, acquiring an additional 3.5% of the company in a ₽2.5 billion deal. Saravia was then sold to private investors. In September 2013, Aurora (originally called Taiga) was created, combining Vladivostok Air and SAT Airlines.

In June 2013, at the World Airline Awards which took place at the 50th Le Bourget air show, Aeroflot was awarded the international prize as the best air carrier in Eastern Europe.

In October 2013, the company introduced an affiliated low-cost carrier (LCC), Dobrolet. It started operations in June 2014; however, it ceased on 4 August 2014 due to EU sanctions over the airline launching flights to Crimea. In late August 2014, Aeroflot announced the launch of Pobeda, a new LCC to replace Dobrolet using aircraft transferred from Orenair. It started operations from Vnukovo Airport in December 2014.

In March 2014, as a response to the Revolution of Dignity, the company announced rerouting of flights to avoid flying over Ukraine. Also, in March 2014, Aeroflot's IATA airline designator ″SU″ was adopted by its subsidiary Rossiya. In September 2015, Aeroflot agreed to acquire 75% of Transaero Airlines for the symbolic price of ₽1, but abandoned the plan after failing to come to terms on a takeover. Aeroflot instead took over several of Transaero's aircraft by assuming its leases after Transaero ceased operations in December 2015, introducing the Boeing 747 and Boeing 777 to the Aeroflot fleet and allowing the company to cancel some of its jet orders.

Subsidiaries Rossiya Airlines, Donavia and Orenair combined operations in late March 2016. Orenair's AOC was cancelled by Russian authorities in late May 2016. Donavia and Orenair were declared bankrupt in 2017.

In June 2018, the company signed a codeshare agreement with Aerolineas Argentinas.

In December 2020, the company sold its 51% stake in Aurora to Sakhalin Region Development Corporation for ₽1.

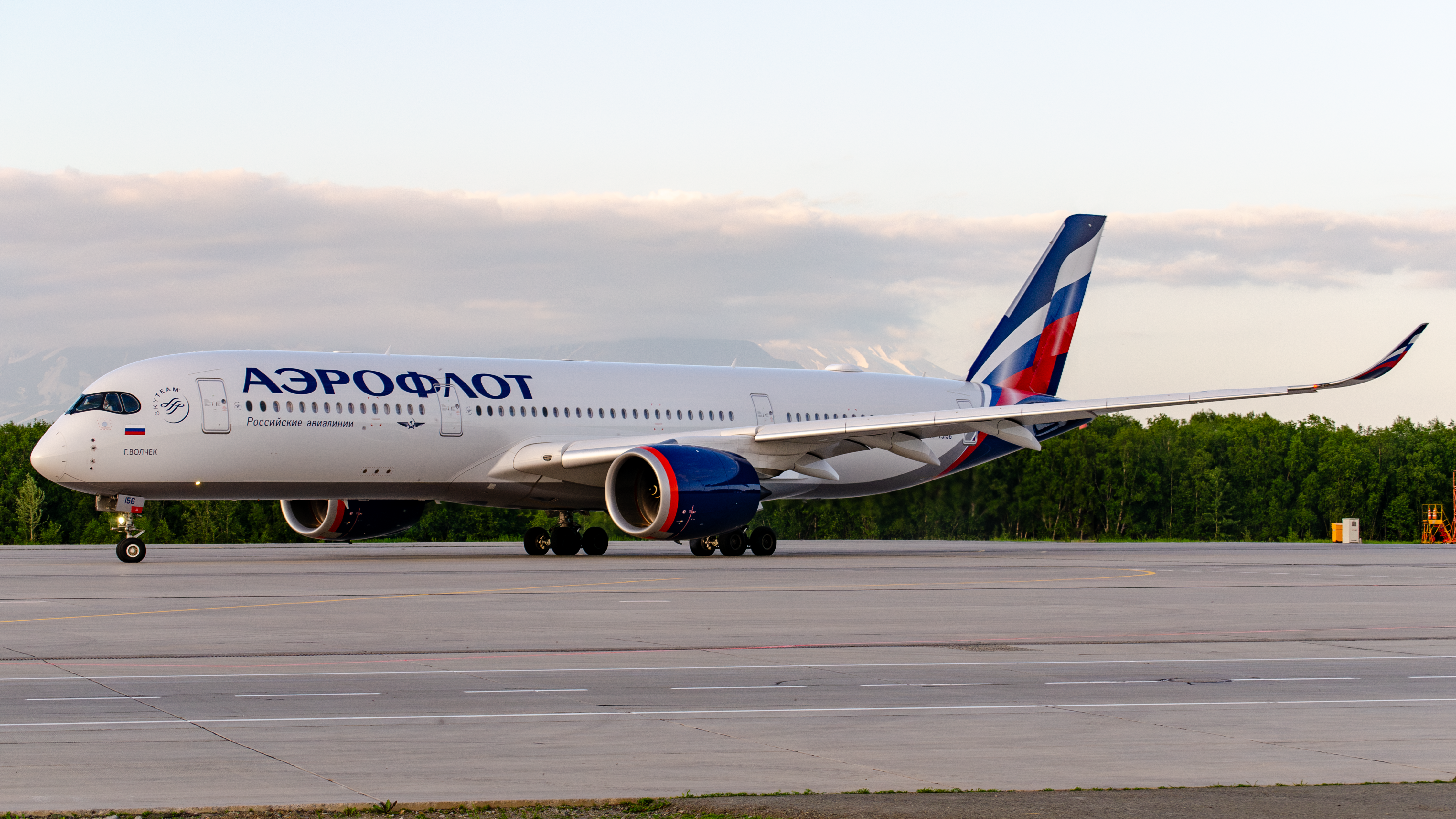
An Airbus A350-900 in Aeroflot livery

==== 2022 airspace bans and sanctions ====
In February and March of the 2022 Russian invasion of Ukraine, Aeroflot and other Russian airlines were banned from the airspace of many countries, and several routes were cancelled as a result. Russian airlines were added to the list of air carriers banned in the European Union for safety reasons because planes were reregistered in Russia and no longer had foreign airworthiness certificates. The U.S. Department of Commerce banned companies from servicing Boeing planes operated by Aeroflot, Aviastar, Azur Air, Belavia, Rossiya and Utair. Manchester United F.C. cancelled its sponsorship agreement that made Aeroflot its official carrier since July 2013. Sabre Corporation and others removed access by Aeroflot to their computer reservation systems and global distribution systems.

In response to the international sanctions during the Russian invasion of Ukraine, Aeroflot migrated to a Russian-based passenger service system, began sourcing aircraft parts via obscure trading companies, free-trade zones and middlemen in countries that have not imposed sanctions on Russia such as United Arab Emirates and China, and placed orders for Russian-made jets such as the Yakovlev MC-21 to reduce its dependence on foreign-made jets.

In September 2023, Aeroflot paid $645 million to acquire 17 aircraft and five spare jet engines that were leased to Aeroflot and owned by AerCap and were stranded in Russia upon the 2022 Russian invasion of Ukraine.

== Corporate affairs ==
=== Management history ===
The Russian government appoints the company's management due to its ownership stake.

==== Chief executive officers ====
- Yevgeny Shaposhnikov (November 1995 – March 1997)
- Valery Okulov, a son-in-law of Boris Yeltsin (May 1997 - March 2009)
- Vitaly Savelyev (2009 – 2020)
- Mikhail Poluboyarinov (2020 – 2022)
- Sergei Alexandrovsky (2022 – present)

==== Chairmen ====
- Yevgeny Dietrich (2018 – 2020)
- Mikhail Poluboyarinov (2020 – 2022)
- Sergei Alexandrovsky (2022 – present)

=== Headquarters ===
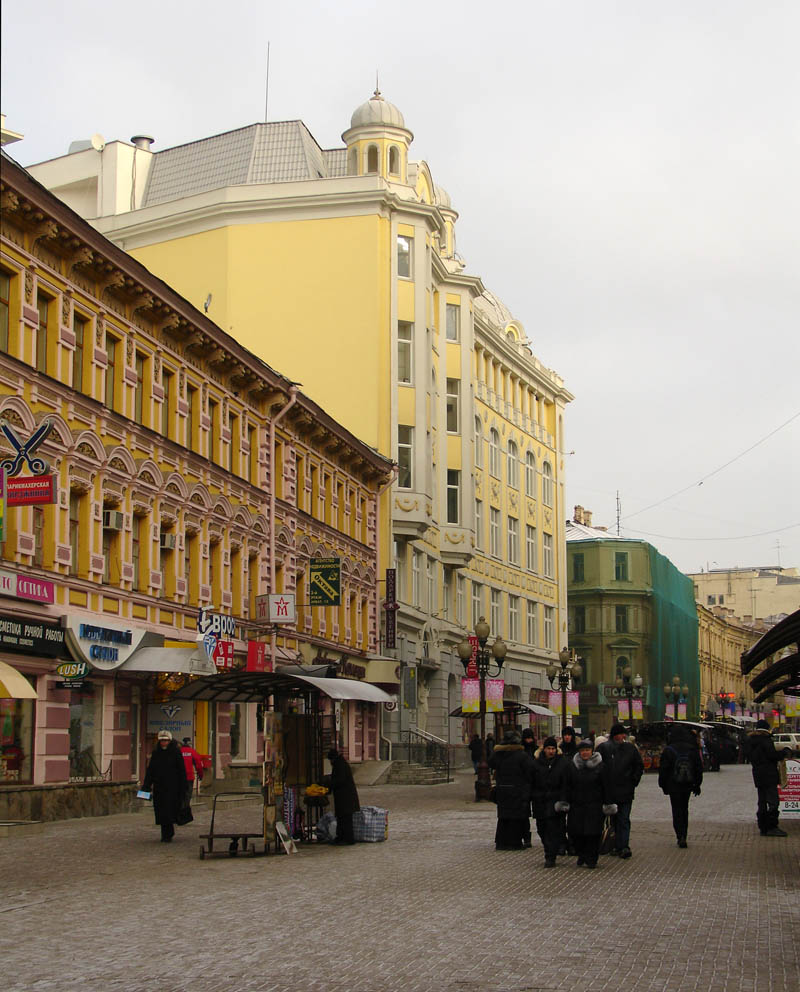
Aeroflot headquarters are in the light yellow building, 10 Arbat Street, Moscow

The headquarters of Aeroflot are on Arbat Street, Arbat District, Central Administrative Okrug, Moscow.

=== Ownership and subsidiaries ===
The Federal Agency for State Property Management, an agency of the Government of Russia, owns 73.77% of the company, with the rest of the shares being public float.

The company owns Pobeda and Rossiya Airlines.

== Destinations ==
In September 2018, Aeroflot served 146 destinations in 52 countries. In 2022, the number of destinations was temporarily reduced after many countries banned Russian aircraft as a result of the 2022 Russian invasion of Ukraine. It currently operates services to and from Armenia, Azerbaijan, Belarus, China, Egypt, Hong Kong, India, Indonesia, Iran, Kazakhstan, Kyrgyzstan, Maldives, Mauritius, Seychelles, Sri Lanka, Thailand, Turkey, United Arab Emirates, Uzbekistan, and Vietnam.

=== Codeshare agreements ===
Aeroflot has active codeshare agreements with the following airlines:

- Aurora
- Cubana de Aviación
- Pobeda
- Rossiya Airlines

=== Interline agreements ===
Aeroflot has active interline agreements with the following airlines:

- Belavia

== Fleet ==
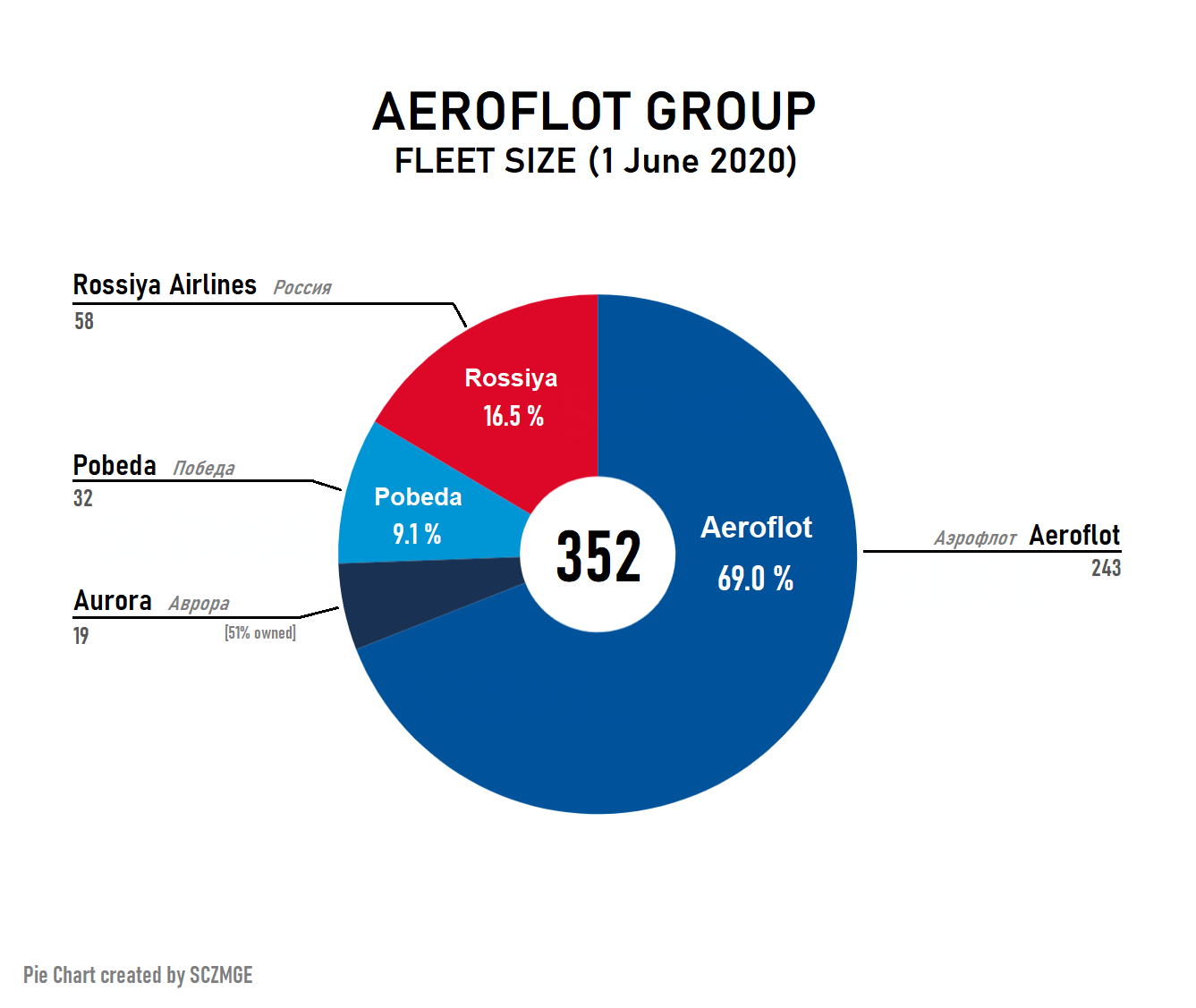
Aeroflot Group fleet size as of 2020

The Aeroflot fleet consists of narrow-body and wide-body aircraft from five aircraft families: Airbus A320 family, Airbus A330, Airbus A350 XWB, Boeing 737, and Boeing 777. The fleet, excluding subsidiaries, includes 171 airplanes: 112 Airbus planes and 59 Boeing planes. The company plans on making the Yakovlev MC-21 its flagship plane, with deliveries expected to start in 2027.

== Alliances ==
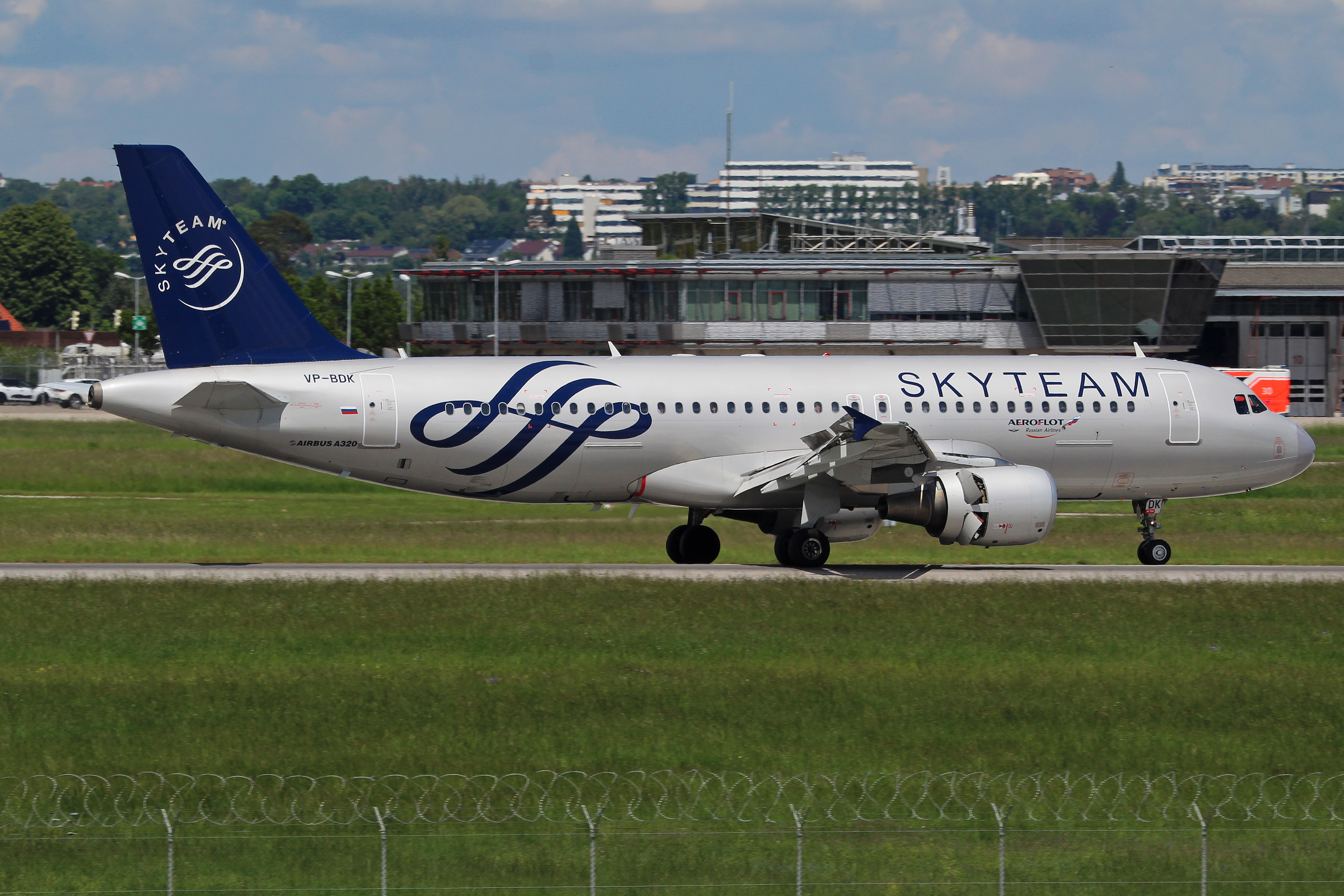
Aeroflot Airbus A320-200 in SkyTeam livery

Aeroflot was a member of SkyTeam airline alliance from April 2006 until 27 April 2022, when its membership was suspended as part of the corporate responses to the Russian invasion of Ukraine.

Aeroflot's cargo branch, Aeroflot-Cargo, which was reintegrated into the parent company in December 2009, operated as part of SkyTeam Cargo.

== Frequent-flyer programme ==
Aeroflot Bonus logo

Aeroflot's frequent-flyer program is called Aeroflot Bonus. It has four levels with various perks.

== Accidents and incidents ==
According to the Aircraft Crashes Record Office, as of February 2016 a total of 8,231 passengers had been killed in crashes involving Aeroflot aircraft – mostly during the Soviet era – over 4.5 times more than any other airline. From 1946 to 1989, the carrier was involved in 721 incidents. In 2013, AirlineRatings.com reported that five of the ten aircraft models involved in the highest numbers of fatal accidents were old Soviet models. From 1992 to 2020, the carrier was involved in 14 incidents; since 1996, only three incidents have resulted in fatalities.

Aviation columnist Patrick Smith stated that Aeroflot's raw crash totals including the Soviet Union era may not give a total picture of the airline's safety record, because the airline was divided into pieces after the conclusion of the Soviet era; according to Smith, the size of Aeroflot's Soviet era operation was the equivalent of all of the large airlines in the United States at the time combined. In the Soviet Union, there was only one airline, that being Aeroflot.

== Labor relations ==
=== Allegations of discrimination against overweight flight attendants ===
In 2016, the company linked the pay of its flight attendants to their dress sizes. All the flight attendants were photographed and measured, and some were weighed. Women above a Russian size 48 were banned from international flights. According to the flight attendants' trade union, the policy affected about 600 Aeroflot attendants. The company successfully defended itself in court in April 2017 by saying that a survey of Aeroflot passengers showed that "92% want to see stewardesses who fit into the clothes sizes we are talking about here" and that every extra kilogram meant spending an extra ₽800 per year on fuel. The company denied all the accusations of discrimination. In September 2017, the appeal court decided that requirements banning employment by women who wore large sizes was unenforceable and ordered ₽5,000 in compensation plus back pay for Yevgenia Magurina, a flight attendant who filed a discrimination suit; however, the court did not rule explicitly that the policy was discriminatory.

=== Working conditions ===
In 2024, the relatively low pay of pilots and crews at Aeroflot compared to other airlines led to staff defections. In 2024 and early 2025, pilots and flight attendants received a 30% pay increase.

In November 2018, per new rules by executive director Vitaly Savelyev, employees of the Moscow office of Aeroflot were forbidden to bring and use smartphones at work, allegedly to prevent them from taking videos.

=== Incidents with flight attendants ===
Flight attendants have been reported to be fired for incidents such as mocking the 2012 Mount Salak Sukhoi Superjet crash in a Twitter post (later hired by Vkontakte), posting an image online with a middle finger gesture directed to passengers (later rehired), and announcing Kaliningrad in English as Königsberg, its former German name.

== See also ==
- List of airports in Russia
- Transport in Russia
- Transport in the Soviet Union

== Bibliography ==
- Buckley, Christopher (2022). Soviet-Era Airliners: The Final Three Decades. Historic Commercial Aircraft Series, Vol 1. Stamford, Lincs, UK: Key Publishing. ISBN 9781913870621.
- Jones, Mark (2018). The Aeroflot Story: From Russia With Luck. Chronik Europa. ISBN 978-1981094714.
- Davies, R.E.G. (1992). Aeroflot: An Airline and Its Aircraft (1st ed.). Rockville, Maryland: Paladwr Press. ISBN 978-0-9626483-1-1.
- MacDonald, Hugh (1975). Aeroflot: Soviet air transport since 1923. Putnam. ISBN 978-0-370-00117-3.
